= Al-Safiriyya =

Al-Safiriyya السافريّة
- Etymology: from a personal name
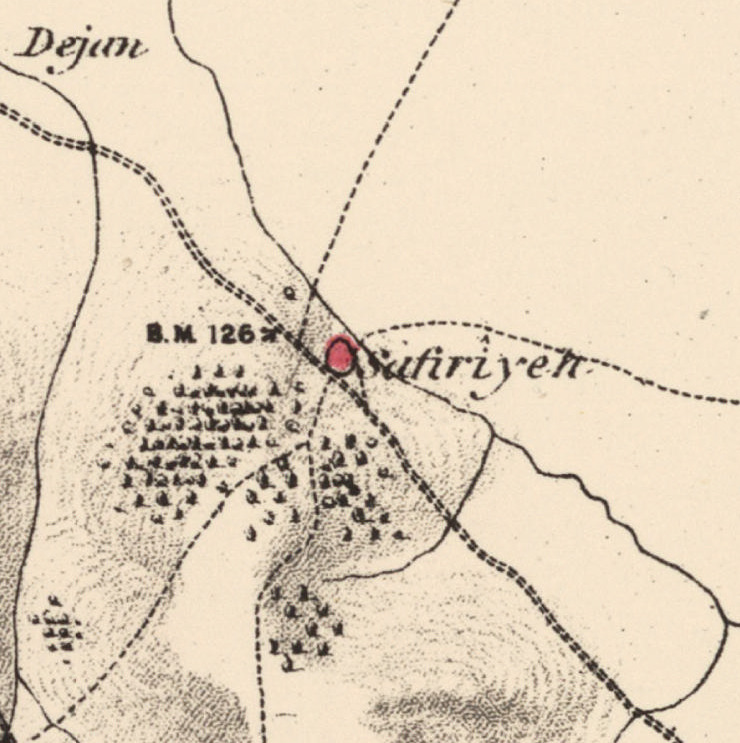
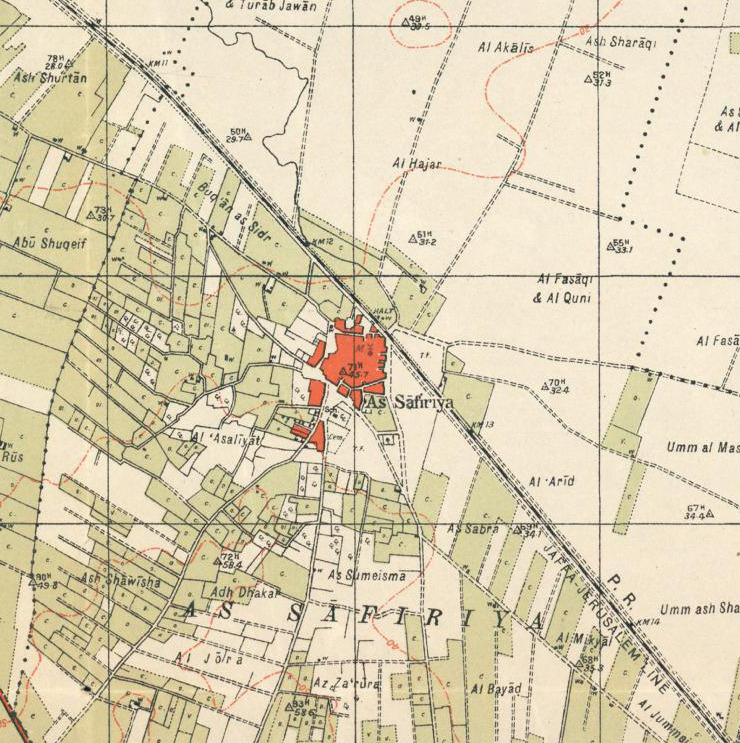
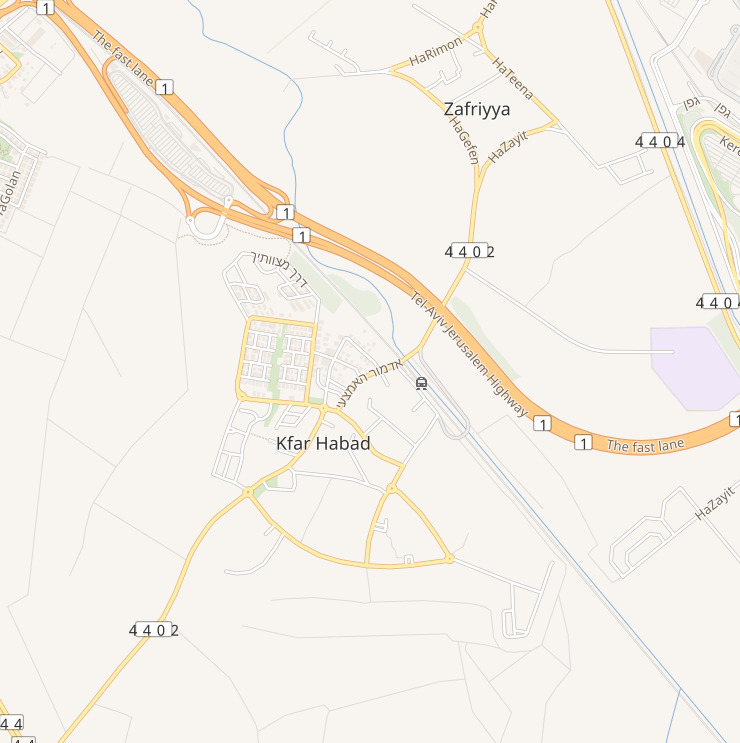
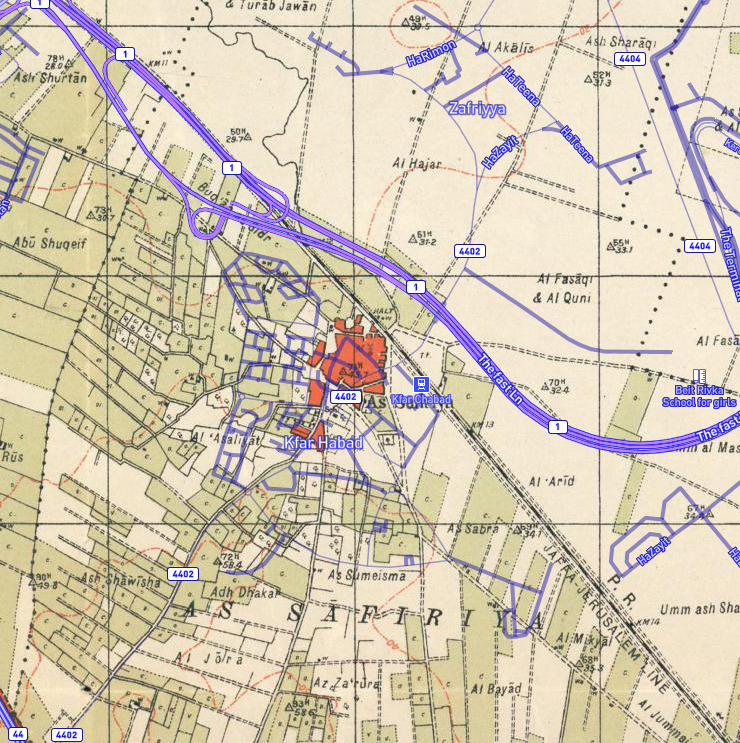
- 1870s map 1940s map modern map 1940s with modern overlay map A series of historical maps of the area around Al-Safiriyya (click the buttons)

- Location within Mandatory Palestine
- Coordinates: 31°59′36″N 34°51′04″E
- Palestine grid: 135/155
- Geopolitical entity: Mandatory Palestine
- Subdistrict: Jaffa
- Date of depopulation: Not known

Area
  - Total: 12,842 dunams (12.842 km^{2}; 4.958 sq mi)

Population (1945)
  - Total: 3,070
- Current Localities: Tzafria, Kfar Chabad, Ahi'ezer Tochelet Sharir Shafrir (at the site of what is now Kfar Chabad) has been absorbed in the previous, and in the suburbs of Rishon LeZion

Al-Safiriyya was a Palestinian Arab village in the Jaffa Subdistrict. It was depopulated during Operation Hametz in the 1948 Palestine War on May 20, 1948. It was located 11 km east of Jaffa, 1.5 km west of Ben Gurion Airport.

Starting in 1949, the ruins of the site were overbuilt by the Israeli settlements of Kfar Chabad and Tzafria.

== History ==
Al-Safiriyya may have been known to the Byzantines and Crusaders as Sapharea or Saphyria. However, later comparative linguistic analysis excluded this possibility.

Hani Al-Kindi, an early Muslim scholar and acetic, was buried in Al-Safiriyya. The Umayyad caliph Umar ibn Abd al-Aziz (717–720) had offered him the Governorship of Palestine, but Al-Kindi had declined it.

=== Ottoman era ===
Al-Safiriyya was incorporated into the Ottoman Empire in 1517 with all of Palestine. In 1552, al-Safiriyya was an inhabited village, and 21 carats of its tax revenues were also endowed to the Haseki Sultan Imaret in Jerusalem. Administratively, the village belonged to the Sub-district of Ramla in the District of Gaza.

In 1596 it appeared in the tax registers under the name of Safiriyya, as being in the nahiya ("subdistrict") of Ramla, which was under the administration of the liwa ("district") of Gaza. It had a population of 53 household; an estimated 292 persons, who were all Muslims. They paid a fixed tax-rate of 33,3 % on agricultural products, including wheat, barley, summer crops, sesame, vineyards, fruit trees, goats and beehives, in addition to occasional revenues; a total of 18,800 akçe. All of the revenue went to a waqf.

In 1051 AH/1641/2, the Bedouin tribe of al-Sawālima from around Jaffa attacked the villages of Subṭāra, Bayt Dajan, al-Sāfiriya, Jindās, Lydda and Yāzūr belonging to Waqf Haseki Sultan.

In 1838 Safiriyeh was among the villages Edward Robinson noted from the top of the White Mosque, Ramla. It was further noted as a Muslim village, in the Lydda District.

In 1863 Victor Guérin found the village to have 450 inhabitants. He noted that the mosque was shaded by an old mulberry tree, and around the village were plantations of tobacco and watermelons.

An Ottoman village list from about 1870 showed that es-Safirije had 29 houses and a population of 134, though the population count included men only.

In 1882, the PEF's Survey of Western Palestine described it as an adobe village, with olives to the south.

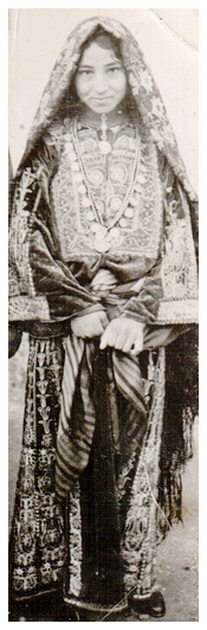
Nasra Hussein Ahmad Zayed, born Safiriyya 1913 CE. Pictured in 1934, wearing a wedding dress.

=== British Mandate era ===
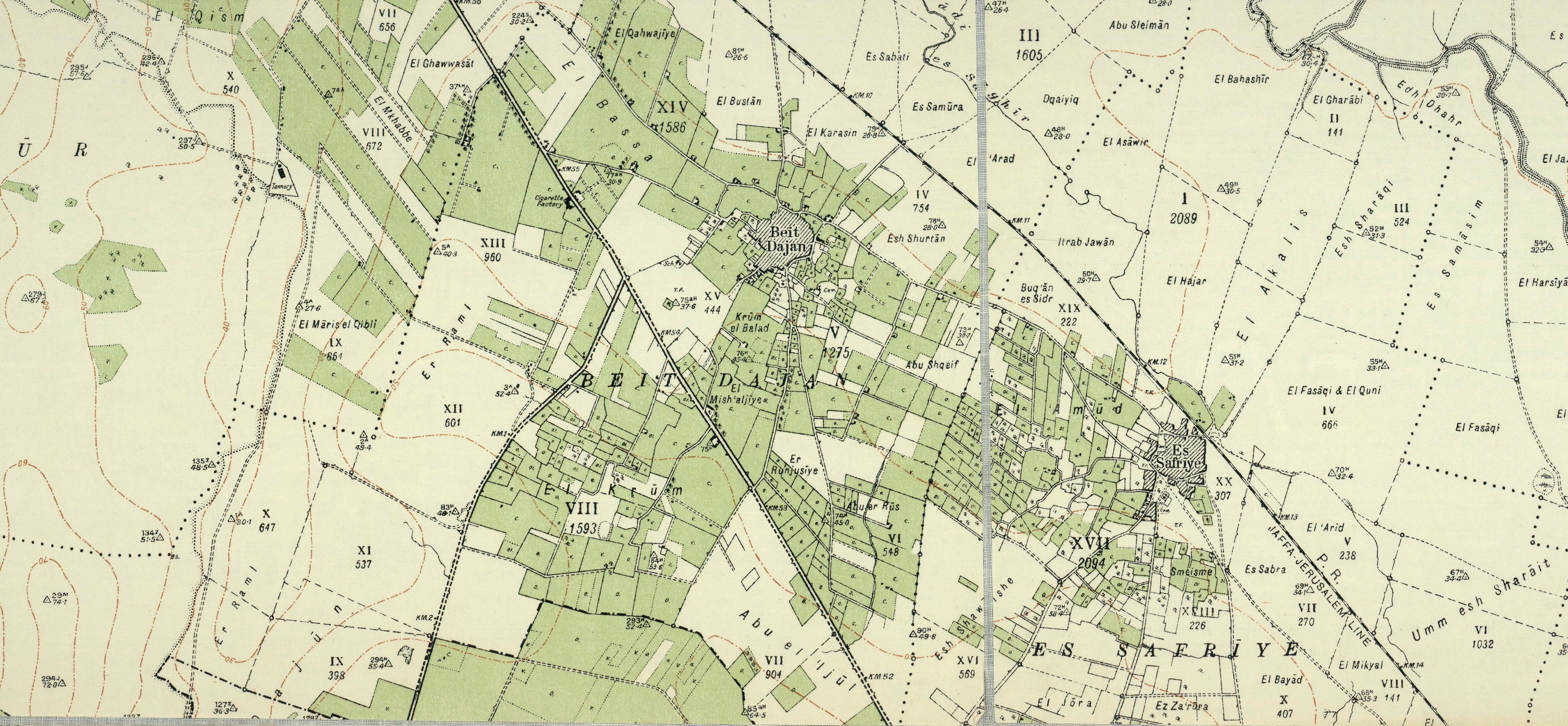
Al-Safiriyya 1929 1:20,000

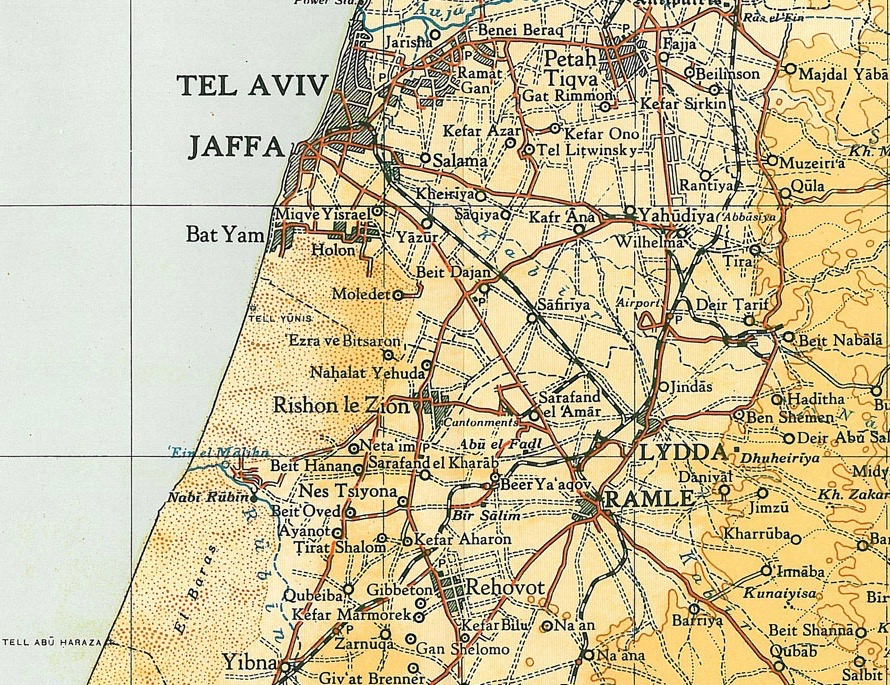
Al-Safiriyya 1945 1:250,000

In the 1922 census of Palestine conducted by the British Mandate authorities, Safriyeh had a population of 1,306, all Muslims, increasing in the 1931 census to 2,040 inhabitants, still all Muslims, in 489 houses.

In the 1945 statistics it had a population of 3,070 Muslims, with 12,842 dunams of land. Of this, Arabs used 3,539 for growing citrus and banana, 3,708 for plantations and irrigable land, 3,032 for cereals, while 95 dunams were classified as built-up areas.

Al-Safiriyya had two elementary schools, one for boys founded in 1920 which had an enrollment of 348 boys in 1945, and another school was for girls, founded in 1945 with 45 girls.

=== 1948, aftermath ===
Benny Morris gives both date and time of depopulation as unknown. Aref al-Aref writes that Al-Safiriyya was occupied by the Yishuv in April, 1948, at the same time as Yazur and Bayt Dajan.

On September 13, 1948, Al-Safiriyya was one of 14 Palestinian villages that Ben-Gurion asked to be destroyed, in order to block the return of the villagers.

Tzafria, Kfar Chabad, Tochelet, Ahi'ezer and the suburbs of Rishon LeZion today occupy Al-Safiriyya land.

In 1992 the village site was described: "The two schools – long concrete structures with rectangular doorways and windows – still stand and have been refurbished. A number of houses, some made of adobe bricks and others of concrete, also remain and are either deserted or inhabited by Jewish families. They are architecturally simple and have rectangular doors and windows; most of their roofs are flat. Cactuses and a variety of trees line an old village road, and the site is generally dotted by sycamore and cypress trees. Parts of the surrounding land are covered by construction but some parts are cultivated by Israelis."

== Bibliography ==
- Barron, J.B., ed. (1923). Palestine: Report and General Abstracts of the Census of 1922. Government of Palestine.
- Conder, C.R.; Kitchener, H.H. (1882). The Survey of Western Palestine: Memoirs of the Topography, Orography, Hydrography, and Archaeology. Vol. 2. London: Committee of the Palestine Exploration Fund.
- Department of Statistics (1945). Village Statistics, April, 1945. Government of Palestine.
- Guérin, V. (1868). Description Géographique Historique et Archéologique de la Palestine (in French). Vol. 1: Judee, pt. 1. Paris: L'Imprimerie Nationale.
- Hadawi, S. (1970). Village Statistics of 1945: A Classification of Land and Area ownership in Palestine. Palestine Liberation Organization Research Center. Archived from the original on 2018-12-08.
- Hartmann, M. (1883). "Die Ortschaftenliste des Liwa Jerusalem in dem türkischen Staatskalender für Syrien auf das Jahr 1288 der Flucht (1871)". Zeitschrift des Deutschen Palästina-Vereins. 6: 102–149.
- Hütteroth, W.-D.; Abdulfattah, K. (1977). Historical Geography of Palestine, Transjordan and Southern Syria in the Late 16th Century. Erlanger Geographische Arbeiten, Sonderband 5. Erlangen, Germany: Vorstand der Fränkischen Geographischen Gesellschaft. ISBN 3-920405-41-2.
- Khalidi, W. (1992). All That Remains: The Palestinian Villages Occupied and Depopulated by Israel in 1948. Washington D.C.: Institute for Palestine Studies. ISBN 0-88728-224-5.
- Mills, E., ed. (1932). Census of Palestine 1931. Population of Villages, Towns and Administrative Areas. Jerusalem: Government of Palestine.
- Morris, B. (2004). The Birth of the Palestinian Refugee Problem Revisited. Cambridge University Press. ISBN 978-0-521-00967-6.
- Palmer, E.H. (1881). The Survey of Western Palestine: Arabic and English Name Lists Collected During the Survey by Lieutenants Conder and Kitchener, R. E. Transliterated and Explained by E.H. Palmer. Committee of the Palestine Exploration Fund.
- Robinson, E.; Smith, E. (1841). Biblical Researches in Palestine, Mount Sinai and Arabia Petraea: A Journal of Travels in the year 1838. Vol. 3. Boston: Crocker & Brewster.
- Socin, A. (1879). "Alphabetisches Verzeichniss von Ortschaften des Paschalik Jerusalem". Zeitschrift des Deutschen Palästina-Vereins. 2: 135–163.
