= Jindas =

Ancient site in Israel

Jindas (Arabic: جنداس; Hebrew: ג'ינדאס) is an archaeological site in 2 kilometers east of the city of Lod in Israel's Central District.

== History ==
The site has been inhabited since at least the Roman period. Its name derives from the Greek personal name Γεννάδις < Γεννάδιος (Gennadios).

During the Crusader-period, it was known as "Casal of Gendas", mentioned in a Latin charter dated 1129 CE. Jisr Jindas, named after the village, is the most famous of the several bridges erected by Sultan Baybars in Palestine, which include the Yibna and the Isdud Bridges (c. 1260s).

Jindās is mentioned in the 15th and 16th centuries as a flourishing village whose lands belonged to different religious endowments.

In 1552 Haseki Hürrem Sultan, the favorite wife of Suleiman the Magnificent, endowed a quarter of the tax revenues of Jindas to its Haseki Sultan Imaret in Jerusalem. Administratively, the village belonged to District of Gaza.

In 1596 Jindas was home to 35 Muslim households. The villagers paid a fixed tax rate of 33.3% for the crops that they cultivated, which included wheat, barley, as well as on other types of property, such as goats and beehives, a total of 5,372 akce, all paid to different waqfs. Among these waqfs, revenues were distributed according to the following partition in carats:

• Waqf Banī ‘Alī Abūghā 4/24

• Waqf Muḥammad Aḥmad al-Miṣrī 5/24

• Waqf al-‘Imāra al-‘Āmira 7/24

• Waqf Khalīl al-Raḥmān 8/24.

In 1051 AH/1641/2, the Bedouin tribe of al-Sawālima from around Jaffa attacked the villages of Subṭāra, Bayt Dajan, al-Sāfiriya, Jindās, Lydda and Yāzūr - which all belonged to Waqf Haseki Sultan.

The desertion of Jindas in the 17th or early 18th century, as well as of its neighbors villages like Beit Qufa and Kafr Jinnis, reflects the unsettled conditions around Lydda as a result from the migrations of nomadic groups and local manifestations of the Qays and Yaman rivalry.

Jindas was resettled in the 19th century, but was abandoned before the end of the century. The inhabitants of Jindās were scattered throughout Palestine's central hill country. The lands of Jindas were cultivated by the inhabitants of Beit Nabala and Lydda. According to Roy Marom, when Jewish organizations expressed an interest colonizing n the region in 1878, the Ottomans declared the land waqf, putting an end to these efforts.

In 2012, an urban renewal organization established in Lod took the name "Jindas."
