= Subtara =

Archaeological site in Israel

Subtara (Arabic: سبتارة) is an archaeological site in the Sdot Dan Regional Council, near the moshav of Yagel in Israel's Central District.

== History ==
The site has been inhabited since ancient times, and its name is of non-Semitic origin.

Archaeological excavations discovered the remains of a Mamluk settlement dating to the 13th and 14th centuries.

Subtara was incorporated into the Ottoman Empire in 1517 with the rest of Palestine. In 1552, Subtara was an inhabited village. Haseki Hürrem Sultan, the favorite wife of Suleiman the Magnificent, endowed its tax revenues to her Haseki Sultan Imaret in Jerusalem. Administratively, the village belonged to the Subdistrict of Ramla in the District of Gaza.

In 1596 it appeared as a large village in the tax registers with a population of 123 households who were all Muslims. They paid a fixed tax-rate of 33,3 % on agricultural products, including wheat, barley, summer crops, sesame, vineyards, fruit trees, goats and beehives, in addition to occasional revenues; a total of 19,100 akçe. All of the revenue went to the Waqf. Archaeological excavations found settlement remains from this period, including walls, floors, cooking ovens and a rich ceramic repertoire.

In 1641/2, the Bedouin tribe of al-Sawālima from around Jaffa attacked the villages of Subtara, Bayt Dajan, al-Sāfiriya, Jindas, Lydda and Yazur belonging to Waqf Haseki Sultan. Subṭāra was later abandoned and its residents moved to Kafr 'Ana, than a minor and insignificant hamlet.

During the 18th and 19th centuries, the area around Subtara now belonged to the Sub-district of Lod that encompassed the area of the present-day city of Modi'in-Maccabim-Re'ut in the south to the present-day city of El'ad in the north, and from the foothills in the east, through the Lod Valley to the outskirts of Jaffa in the west. This area was home to thousands of inhabitants in about 20 villages. The lands of Subtara were subsumed by the village of al-Safiriyya.
