= Akhiezer =

Akhiezer (Hebrew: אחיעזר, Russian: Ахие́зер) is a surname. Notable people with the surname include:

- Aleksander Akhiezer (1911–2000), Jewish Belarusian-Soviet nuclear physicist
- Naum Akhiezer (1901–1980), Jewish Belarusian-Soviet mathematician

== See also ==
- Ahiezer (biblical figure)
- Ahi'ezer (moshav)
