= Yagel =

Moshav in central Israel

Yagel: יגל (Hebrew)
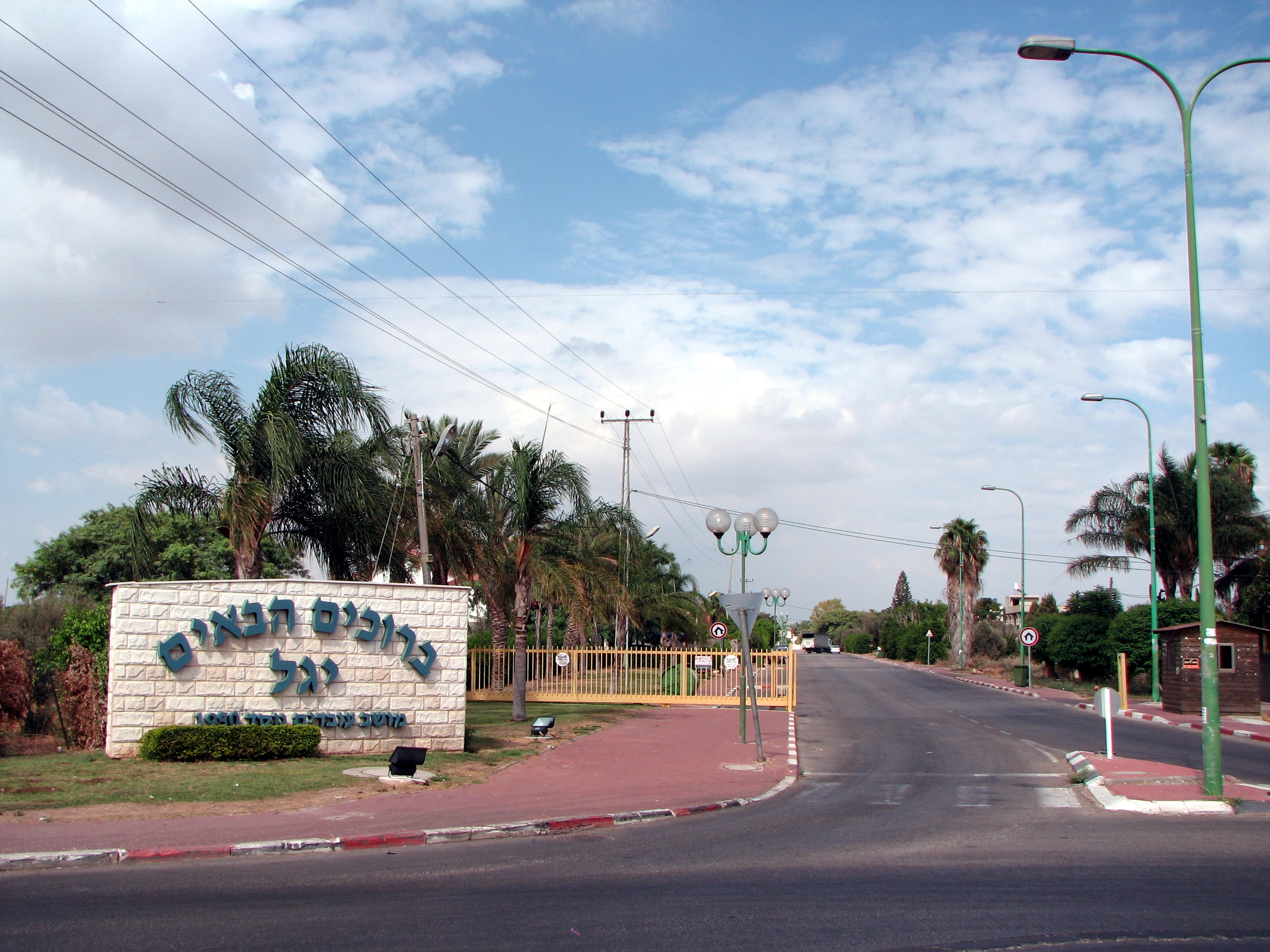
- Etymology: He will rejoice
- Location within Central Israel Location within Israel
- Coordinates: 31°59′16″N 34°52′44″E
- Country: Israel
- District: Central
- Subdistrict: Ramla
- Council: Sdot Dan
- Affiliation: Moshavim Movement
- Founded: 27 June 1950
- Founder: Iraqi immigrants
- Population (2024): 1,139

Yagel (Hebrew: יגל, lit. 'He will rejoice') is a religious moshav in the Central District of Israel. Located near Lod and Ben Gurion International Airport, it falls under the jurisdiction of Sdot Dan Regional Council. In 2024 it had a population of 1,139.

== History ==
Yagel was the site of the Mamluk and Ottoman village of Subtara. During the 16 century Haseki sultan endowed Subtara to its Jerusalem soup kitchen. During the 18th and 19th centuries, the area around Yagel belonged to the Nahiyeh (sub-district) of Lod that encompassed the area of the present-day city of Modi'in-Maccabim-Re'ut in the south to the present-day city of El'ad in the north, and from the foothills in the east, through the Lod Valley to the outskirts of Jaffa in the west. The area was home to thousands of inhabitants in about 20 villages, who had at their disposal tens of thousands of hectares of prime agricultural land.

The moshav was founded on 27 June 1950 by immigrants from Iraq on land located near the depopulated Palestinian village of Kafr 'Ana. It was initially named Lod Bet, but was later renamed Yagel, a name taken from the Book of Psalms 14:7;

Oh that the salvation of Israel were come out of Zion! When the LORD turneth the captivity of His people, let Jacob rejoice, let Israel be glad.
