= Kafr Jinnis =

Archaeological site in Israel

Kafr Jinnis (Arabic: كفر جنّس; Hebrew: כפר גינס) is an ancient site in modern-day Israel, 2 kilometers west of Ben Gurion Airport.

== History ==
The site has been inhabited since at least the Roman period. Its name derives from the Greek personal name Γενναῖος/ Γέννιος (“high-born, noble").

In 1552, Haseki Hürrem Sultan, the favourite wife of Suleiman the Magnificent, endowed a quarter of the tax revenues of Kafr Jinnis to its Haseki Sultan Imaret in Jerusalem. Like its neighbor Jindas, the village belonged administratively to District of Gaza.

In 1596, Kafr Jinnis was home to 18 Muslim households. The villagers paid a fixed tax rate of 33,3% for the crops that they cultivated, which included wheat, barley, as well as on other types of property, such as goats and beehives, a total of 8,600 akce, all paid to the waqf.
