= Yazur =

Yazur يازور
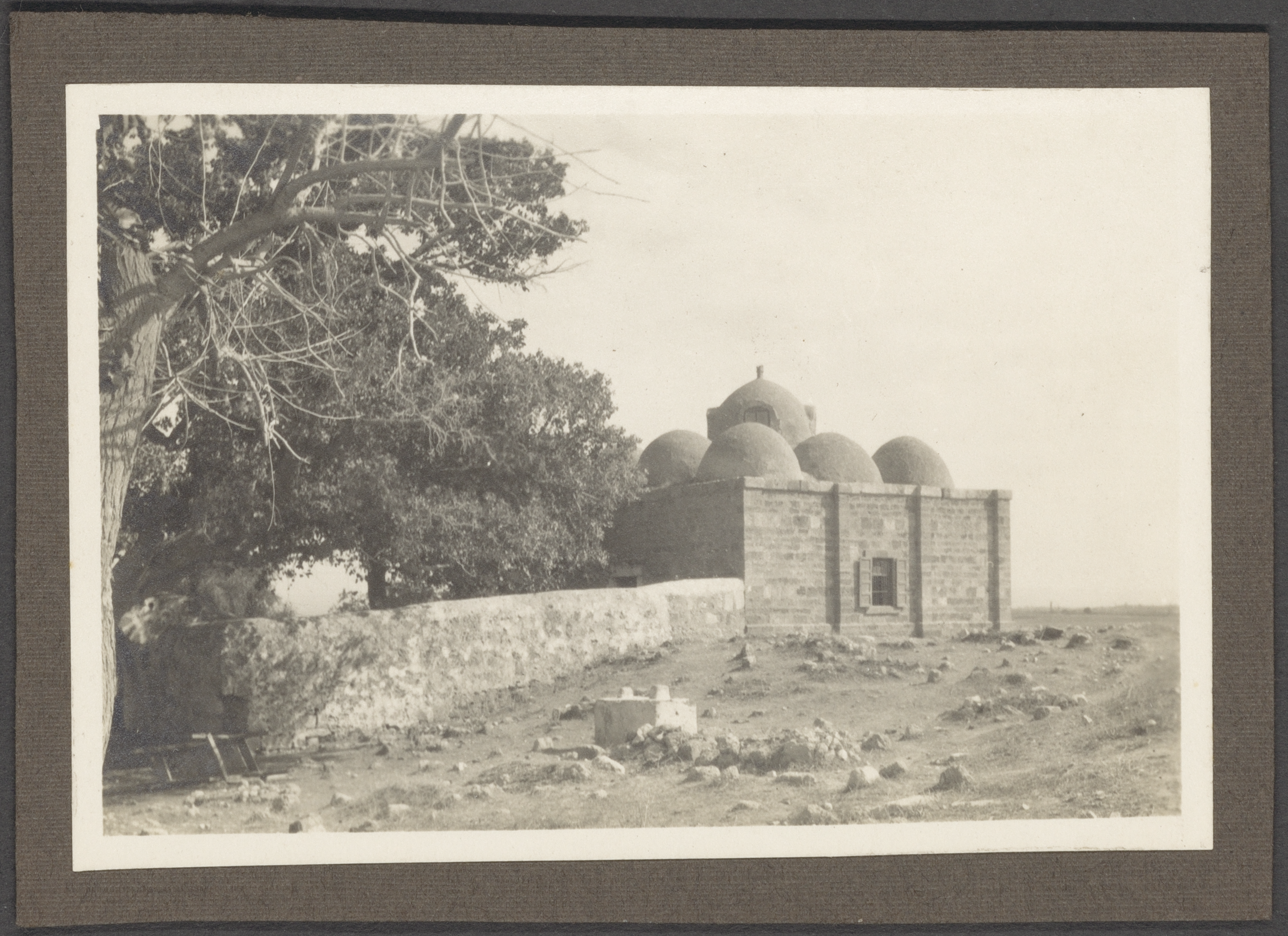
- Maqam (shrine) of Imam ʿAli, in early 1920s, (presently housing the Sha'arei Zion Synagogue)
- Etymology: Yazur
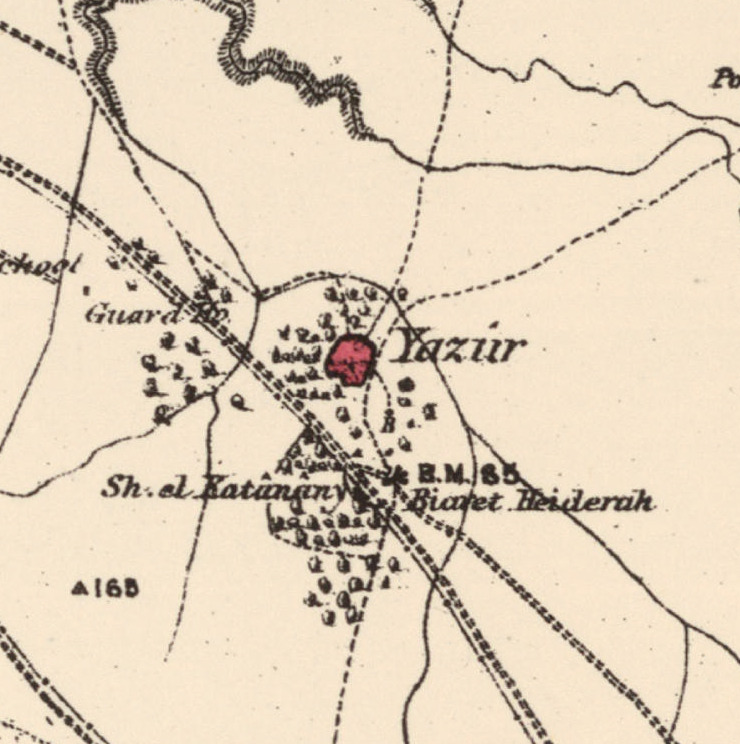
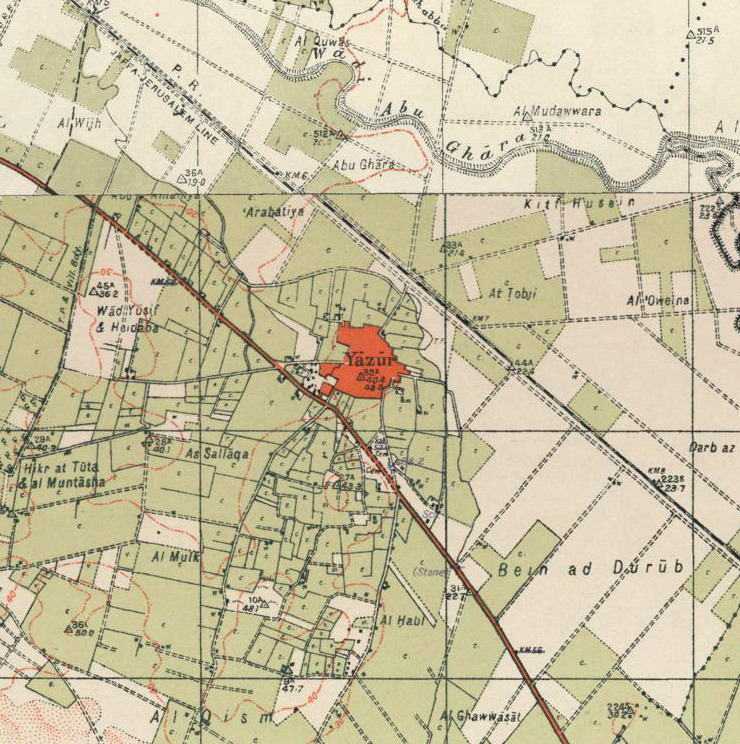
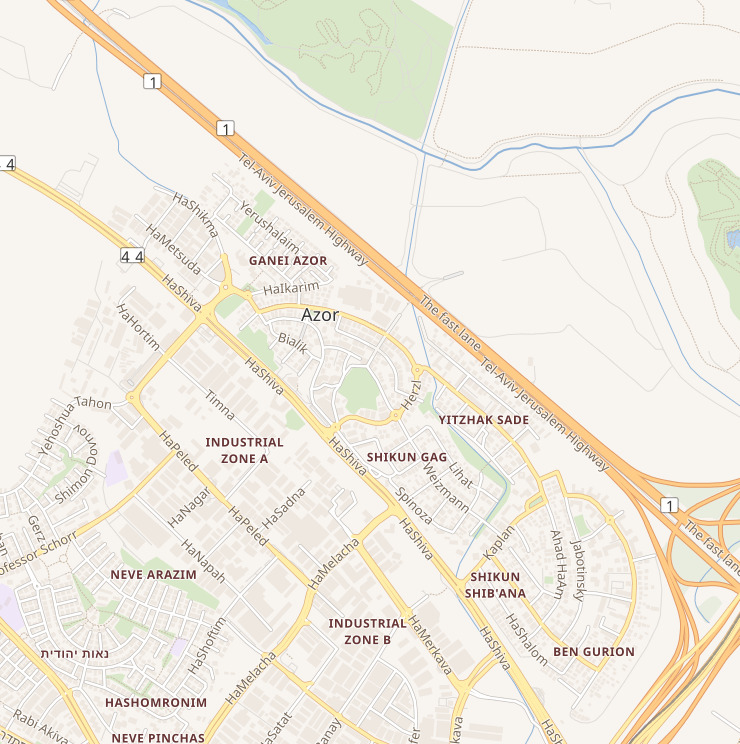
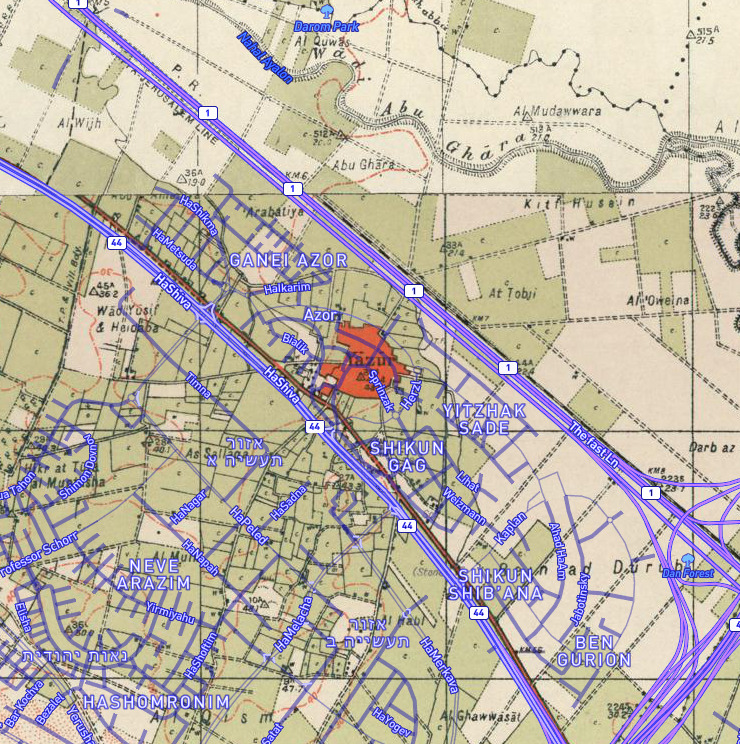
- 1870s map 1940s map modern map 1940s with modern overlay map A series of historical maps of the area around Yazur (click the buttons)

- Location within Mandatory Palestine
- Coordinates: 32°01′34″N 34°48′17″E
- Palestine grid: 131/159
- Geopolitical entity: Mandatory Palestine
- Subdistrict: Jaffa
- Date of depopulation: 1 May 1948

Area
  - Total: 9,742 dunams (9.742 km^{2}; 3.761 sq mi)

Population (1945)
  - Total: 4,030
- Cause(s) of depopulation: Military assault by Yishuv forces
- Secondary cause: Influence of nearby town's fall
- Current Localities: Azor, Holon

Yazur (Arabic: يازور, Hebrew: יאזור) was a Palestinian Arab town located 6 kilometers (3.7 mi) east of Jaffa. Mentioned in 7th century BCE Assyrian texts, the village was a site of contestation between Muslims and Crusaders in the 12th-13th centuries.

During the Fatimid period in Palestine, a number of important people were born in Yazur. In the modern era, the town was the birthplace of Ahmed Jibril, the founder of the Popular Front for the Liberation of Palestine – General Command (PFLP-GC).

Yazur was ethnically cleansed and during the Nakba. It was later demolished and the Israeli town of Azor, reflecting the site's ancient name, was constructed on the site.

== Etymology ==
The earliest occurrence of the name is Babylonian A-zu-ru (in a Neo-Assyrian text from 701 B.C.E.) which is compatible with the Septuagint form Άζωρ.

According to scholars, the name my derive from Semitic root ’-Z-R “to gird, encompass, equip”, originally in Hebrew but with cognates in Jewish Aramaic and Arabic. According to Marom and Zadok, "this derivation is highly hypothetical as this root is so far not productive in the toponymy."

== History ==
=== Iron Age ===
The village is mentioned in the annals of the Assyrian ruler Sennacherib (704 – 681 BCE) as Azuro.

=== Fatimid, Crusader, Ayyubid and Mamluk eras ===
The Arab geographer Yaqut al-Hamawi (1179–1229) described Yazur as a small town that was the birthplace of several important figures during the Fatimid period. Most prominent among them was al-Hasan ibn ´Ali al-Yazuri, who became a Fatimid minister in 1050 CE. In the twelfth and thirteenth centuries CE, Muslim and Crusader forces fought for control of the village and it changed hands several times, before finally falling under the control of the Mamluks.

=== Ottoman era ===
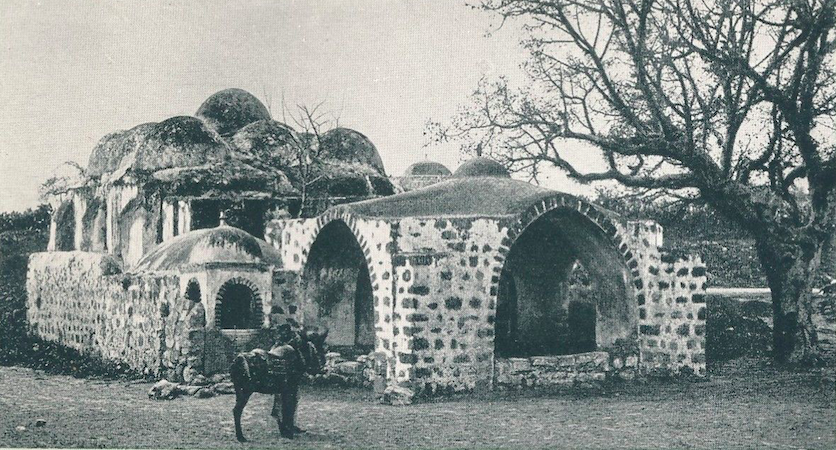
Maqam (shrine) of Imam ´Ali, ca. 1887

During early Ottoman rule in Palestine, in 1552, the revenues of the village of Yazur were designated for the new waqf of Hasseki Sultan Imaret in Jerusalem, established by Hasseki Hurrem Sultan (Roxelana), the wife of Suleiman the Magnificent. In 1586, the Maqam Imam ´Ali in Yazur was seen by Jean Zuallart, who described it as follows: "....a little further was a square mosque with nine little cupolas. Across the road there is a well or cistern."

In the 1596 tax records, Yazur was a village in the nahiya ("subdistrict") of Ramla, part of Sanjak of Gaza. It had a population 50 Muslim households, an estimated 275 persons. The villagers paid a fixed tax rate of 33,3% for the crops that they cultivated, which included wheat, barley, fruit, and sesame, as well as on other types of property, such as goats and beehives; a total of 19,250 akçe. All of the revenue went to a Muslim charitable institution.

In 1602, Seusenius described the Maqam Imam ´Ali as "a mosque with nine cupolas the one in the middle being the highest".

In 1051 AH/1641/2, the Bedouin tribe of al-Sawālima from around Jaffa attacked the villages of Subṭāra, Bayt Dajan, al-Sāfiriya, Jindās, Lydda and Yāzūr belonging to Waqf Haseki Sultan.

The Syrian Sufi teacher and traveller Mustafa al-Bakri al-Siddiqi (1688-1748/9)(id), who travelled in the region in the first half of the eighteenth century, and Mustafa al-Dumyati (d. 1764) reported visiting the shrine of a sage called Sayyiduna ("our master") Haydara in Yazur. The village appeared named Jazour on the map that Pierre Jacotin compiled in 1799 during the French campaign in Egypt and Syria.

In 1863 Victor Guérin described it: "I pass through the village of Yazour: situated on a small hill to the left of the road, it has about three hundred inhabitants."..."The mosque offers me some ancient blocks, of larger dimensions and fairly well squared. Around the village, fertile gardens are planted with fig and olive trees, among which I spot some of those beautiful acacia mimosas that the Arabs call seder". While the area was still under the rule of the Ottoman Empire in 1870, Charles Netter from Alliance Israélite Universelle founded the Mikveh Israel southeast of Jaffa. Through a firman of the sultan, he received land for the school. Until then the land had been cultivated by the fellahin of Yazur village. In a Survey of Western Palestine (1882), it is noted that, "Though the land belongs to the Government, the Fellahin, from long usage, have got to look upon it as virtually their own, and resent its occupation by any other person." The peasants became bitter enemies of the school farm.

In the late summer of 1870, the governor of Damascus visited Jaffa. Accompanied by Netter and two Templars, Christoph Hoffmann and Ernst Hardegg, the governor passed by Yazur:

While riding between Natter's property and the city, the Wali was beset by Arab women and men who begged him, holding onto the reigns {sic, should be 'reins'} of his mule, and onto his trousers, to help them regain their rights, the Jews were taking away their land; here they pointed at Natter, who rode next to the Wali, screaming "the Jews, the Jews." The Pasha, riding on the other side, asked Ernst for his riding crop and chased them away himself. The Wali accepted a petition handed him by a shaykh, incidentally.

The PEF's Survey of Western Palestine reported that in 1882 the village structures were built of adobe brick, there were dispersed gardens and wells, and Yazur contained a domed shrine.

=== British Mandate era ===
Woman by the well, holding a jug on her head, ca 1921, photo by Frank Scholten

Modern Yazur was divided into four quarters, one for each of four clans (hama´il, sing. hamula) that lived there. The houses were traditionally made of stone or adobe brick and straw and were built in groups called ahwash (pl. of hawsh, "courtyard"). Each house in such a group opened onto a common courtyard that had a single entrance, often an arched gate. Extended families lived in the ahwash.

The village had two elementary schools, one for boys (built in 1920) and another for girls (opened in 1933). The boys' school occupied 27 dunums (the bulk of which was allocated for training students in agronomy) and had its own artesian well. In 1947, 430 boys and 160 girls were registered in these schools. The remains of an old Crusader church built by Richard the Lionheart in 1191, called Castel des Plaines, were visible on a hill inside the village. The Crusader church had been rebuilt to serve as Yazur's mosque.

In the 1922 census of Palestine conducted by the British Mandate authorities, Yazur had a population of 1,284 residents, all Muslims. By the 1931 census, the population had increased to 2,337 inhabitants in 419 houses.

According to the 1945 census, Yazur had a population of 4,030, mostly Muslim Arabs, with a very small Arab Christian community of 20 people. Agriculture constituted the backbone of the economy; in 1944, citrus was planted on 6,272 dunums and 1,441 dunums were allocated to cereals. Agriculture was both rainfed and irrigated; 1,689 dunums were irrigated or used for orchards. During World War II, the villagers also started raising Holstein cows. By 1947 numerous artesian wells were being used for irrigation.

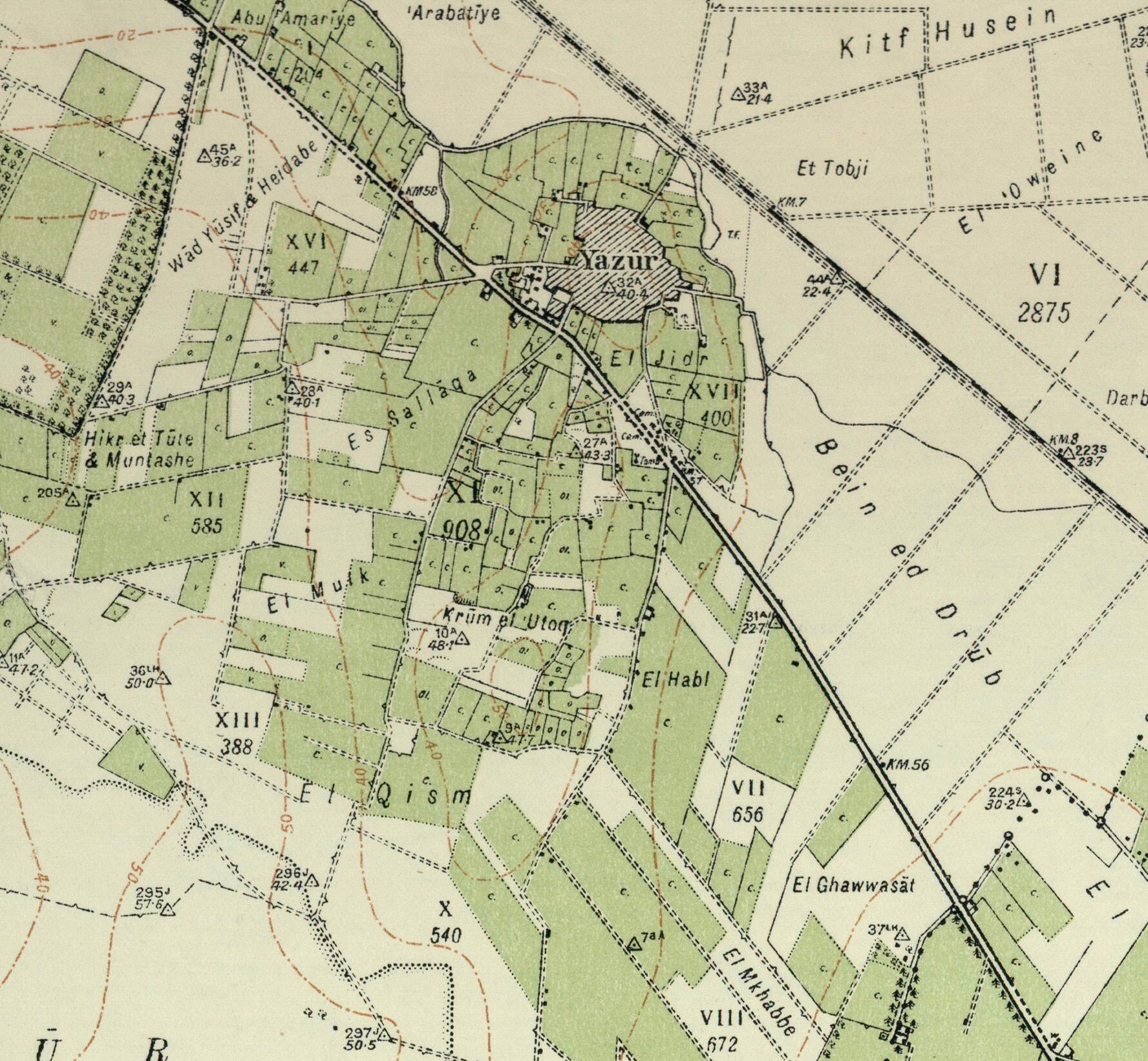
Yazur 1929 1:20,000

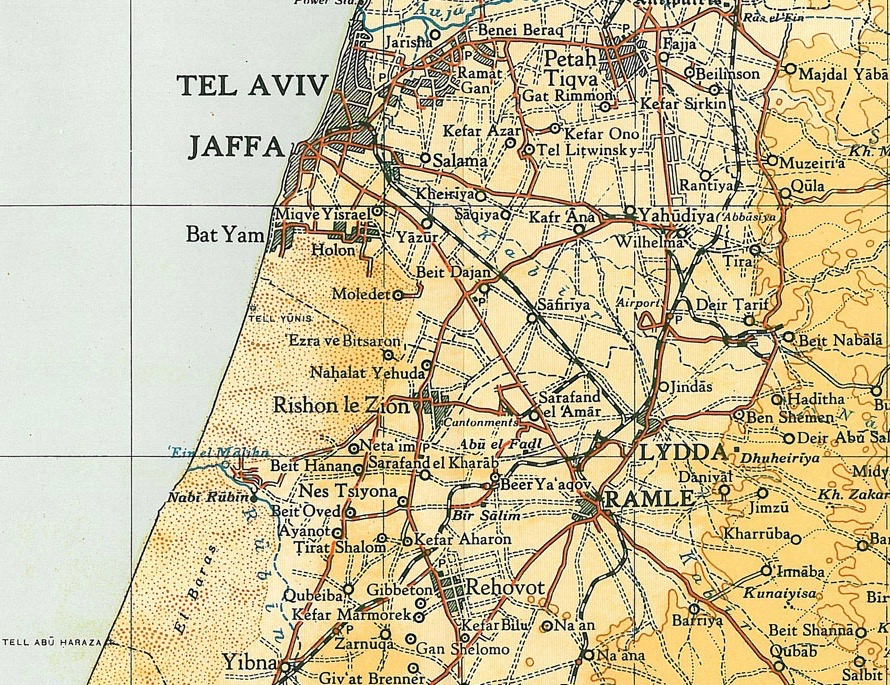
Yazur 1945 1:250,000

=== Lead-up to 1947-1948 war, and after ===
The Filastin newspaper reported that on December 11, 1947, members of a pro-Zionist armed group drove at high speed through the town, throwing bombs at a barbershop and a coffeehouse. They did not cause any fatalities. However, Aref al-Aref reports that one week later, on 18 December, more Zionist militia returned, this time disguised as British soldiers. Driving along the main road they threw several bombs at a coffeehouse, killing six villagers. Filastin reported that on 30 December, another Zionist raiding party had tried to blow up village houses. This group was discovered by the village guards and driven away. More attacks followed in early 1948.

On January 22, 1948 a Jewish convoy was ambushed at Yazur. The Times reported that "seven Jewish Policemen killed" and in a second incident half an hour later three Arabs were killed and six injured in another attack on Jews from a passing vehicle.

On February 12 Yazur and Abu Kabir were attacked by Zionist mortars and machine-guns. Several houses in Yazur were destroyed. Attacks followed almost weekly, including on 20 February when Zionist forces attacked the village with tanks and armoured vehicles, destroying an ice factory, two houses, and killing one villager and wounding four.

During the Haganah's offensive Operation Hametz 28–30 April 1948, the population was forced from Yazur or killed. This was during the 1947–48 Civil War in Mandatory Palestine, weeks prior to the outbreak of the wider 1948 Arab-Israeli War. This operation was conducted against Yazur and a group of Arab villages east of Jaffa. According to the preparatory orders, the objective was "opening the way [for Jewish forces] to Lydda".

Though there was no explicit mention of the prospective treatment of the villagers, the order spoke of "cleansing the area" [tihur hashetah]. The final operational order stated: "Civilian inhabitants of places conquered would be permitted to leave after they are searched for weapons." Soldiers were instructed not to harm women and children "insofar as possible" and not to loot captured villages. Most of the village buildings were destroyed in the fighting.

== The village today ==
According to Walid Khalidi, 1992, two Muslim shrines remain standing in the village. One is made of stone and its roof is topped with a dozen domes clustered around a more prominent dome at the center. A number of other structures and houses are also still intact; some are used, while others are vacant. One house, occupied by a Jewish family, is a two-storey concrete unit that has a rectangular door and a modified gabled roof.

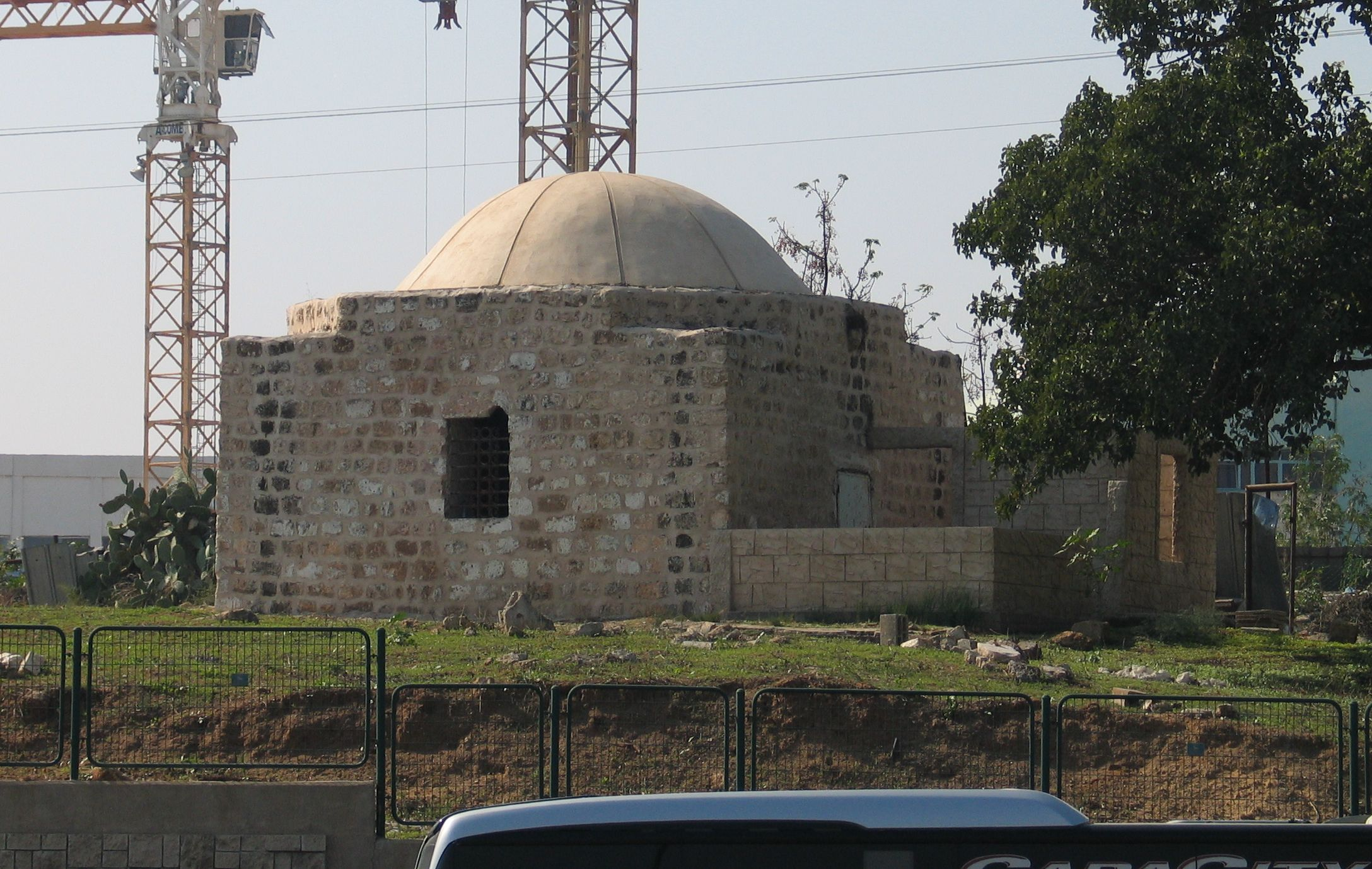
Maqam (shrine) of Shaykh al-Katanani, 2008

According to Petersen, the small mosque/shrine located at a distance of some 50 meters from Maqam Imam ´Ali, on the opposite side of the road, was known as Shaykh al-Katanan. Inspected in 1991, it was found to be built on a square plan with a shallow dome resting on an octagonal drum. The building is entered through a doorway in the middle of the north side. Inside there are windows on the west and east side flanked by niches. In the middle of the south wall is a shallow niche, which was found decorated with inscriptions painted in henna.

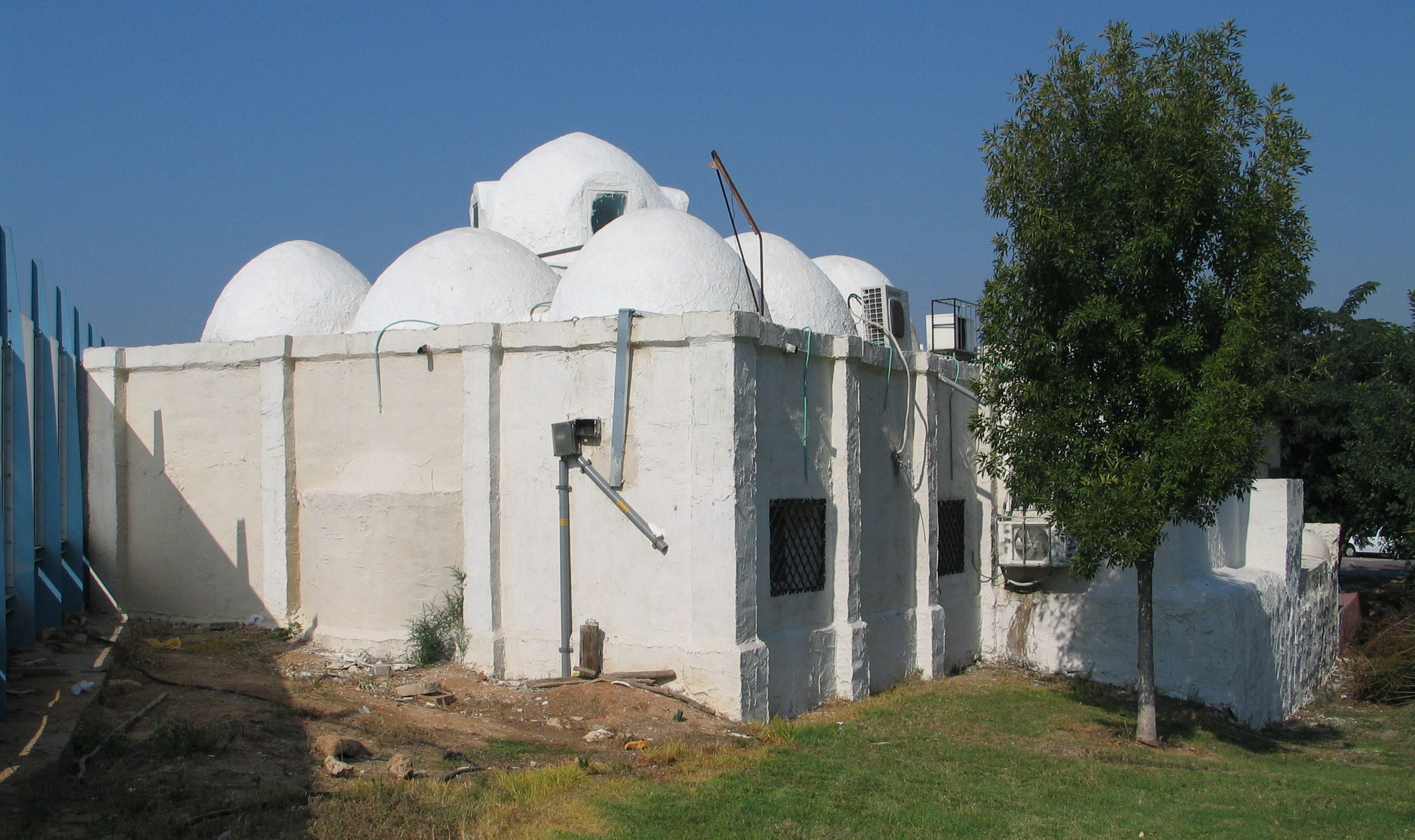
Maqam (shrine) of Imam ´Ali, 2008

According to Meron Benvenisti, 2000, the village of Yazur holds the venerated grave of Imam ´Ali, a famous miracle-worker. Another dozen places also claim to have his grave. The Yazur site is a massive building with a central dome encircled by nine smaller ones. It is most widely held to be the actual burial site of Imam ´Ali. His tomb is nearly the sole monument left in the village.

The tomb building is now used by Israelis for the Sha´arei Zion Synagogue and a seminary for Orthodox Jews. On the roof, beside the domes, a satellite dish has been installed to receive live religious broadcasts. There is an adjoining Muslim cemetery, where two or three broken gravestones are all that remain. It is now used by Jewish Israelis as a dump for "yard trash only."

Across the road, in the Holon industrial park, is located yet another Muslim holy site, this one deserted and falling to pieces.

== Persons associated with Yazur ==
- Ahmed Jibril - founder and head of PFLP-GC
- Hassan ibn Ali al-Yazuri - The Sunni vizier and chief judge of Fatimid ruler Al-Mustansir Billah, from 1050-58

== See also ==
- Depopulated Palestinian locations in Israel
- Salama (town)

== Bibliography ==
- Barron, J. B., ed. (1923). Palestine: Report and General Abstracts of the Census of 1922. Government of Palestine.
- Benvenisti, M. (2000). Sacred Landscape: The Buried History of the Holy Land since 1948. University of California Press. (pp. 32–33, 292)
- Brink, van den, Edwin C.M. (2005-04-14). "Azor l Report". Hadashot Arkheologiyot – Excavations and Surveys in Israel (117).
- Buchennino, Aviva (2009-03-12). "Azor l Report". Hadashot Arkheologiyot – Excavations and Surveys in Israel (118).
- Clermont-Ganneau, C.S. (1896). [ARP] Archaeological Researches in Palestine 1873-1874, translated from the French by J. McFarlane. Vol. 2. London: Palestine Exploration Fund. (pp. 5, 254, 489)
- Conder, C.R.; Kitchener, H. H. (1882). The Survey of Western Palestine: Memoirs of the Topography, Orography, Hydrography, and Archaeology. Vol. 2. London: Committee of the Palestine Exploration Fund.
- Department of Statistics (1945). Village Statistics, April, 1945. Government of Palestine.
- Gorzalczany, Amir (2009-03-12). "Azor, Ha-Histadrut Street Final Report l Report". Hadashot Arkheologiyot – Excavations and Surveys in Israel (121).
- Guérin, V. (1868). Description Géographique Historique et Archéologique de la Palestine (in French). Vol. 1: Judee, pt. 1. Paris: L'Imprimerie Nationale.
- Hadawi, S. (1970). Village Statistics of 1945: A Classification of Land and Area ownership in Palestine. Palestine Liberation Organization Research Center.
- Hütteroth, W.-D.; Abdulfattah, K. (1977). Historical Geography of Palestine, Transjordan and Southern Syria in the Late 16th Century. Erlanger Geographische Arbeiten, Sonderband 5. Erlangen, Germany: Vorstand der Fränkischen Geographischen Gesellschaft. ISBN 3-920405-41-2.
- Karmon, Y. (1960). "An Analysis of Jacotin's Map of Palestine" (PDF). Israel Exploration Journal. 10 (3, 4): 155–173, 244–253. Archived from the original (PDF) on 2019-12-22.
- Khalidi, W. (1992). All That Remains: The Palestinian Villages Occupied and Depopulated by Israel in 1948. Washington D.C.: Institute for Palestine Studies. ISBN 0-88728-224-5.
- Le Strange, G. (1890). Palestine Under the Moslems: A Description of Syria and the Holy Land from A.D. 650 to 1500. Committee of the Palestine Exploration Fund.
- Mariti, G. (1792). Travels Through Cyprus, Syria, and Palestine; with a General History of the Levant. Vol. 1. Dublin: P. Byrne. (pp. 406-7)
- Mills, E., ed. (1932). Census of Palestine 1931. Population of Villages, Towns and Administrative Areas. Jerusalem: Government of Palestine.
- Morris, B. (2004). The Birth of the Palestinian Refugee Problem Revisited. Cambridge University Press. ISBN 978-0-521-00967-6.
- Morris, B. (2008). 1948: A History of the First Arab-Israeli War. Yale University Press. ISBN 9780300126969.
- Palmer, E. H. (1881). The Survey of Western Palestine: Arabic and English Name Lists Collected During the Survey by Lieutenants Conder and Kitchener, R. E. Transliterated and Explained by E.H. Palmer. Committee of the Palestine Exploration Fund.
- Petersen, Andrew (2001). A Gazetteer of Buildings in Muslim Palestine (British Academy Monographs in Archaeology). Vol. I. Oxford University Press. ISBN 978-0-19-727011-0.
- Pringle, D. (1997). Secular buildings in the Crusader Kingdom of Jerusalem: an archaeological Gazetteer. Cambridge University Press. ISBN 0521-46010-7. (p. 108 )
- al-Qawuqji, F. (1972): Memoirs of al-Qawuqji, Fauzi in Journal of Palestine Studies
  - "Memoirs, 1948, Part I" in 1, no. 4 (Sum. 72): 27-58., dpf-file, downloadable
  - "Memoirs, 1948, Part II" in 2, no. 1 (Aut. 72): 3-33., dpf-file, downloadable
- Romano, Amit (2004-06-09). "Azor Final Report". Hadashot Arkheologiyot – Excavations and Surveys in Israel (116).
- Schölch, Alexander (1993): Palestine in Transformation, 1856–1882, ISBN 0-88728-234-2,
- Singer, A. (2002). Constructing Ottoman Beneficence: An Imperial Soup Kitchen in Jerusalem. Albany: State University of New York Press. ISBN 0-7914-5352-9.
- Torge, Hagit (2005-03-28). "Azor Final Report l Report". Hadashot Arkheologiyot – Excavations and Surveys in Israel (117).
- Wilson, C.W., ed. (c. 1881). Picturesque Palestine, Sinai and Egypt. Vol. 3. New York: D. Appleton. (p. 141, 143 ff )
- Zuallart, J. [in French] (1587). Il devotissimo viaggio di Gervsalemme. Roma.Yazur p. 11 & 112 in the 1585-edition
