= Sakher Habash =

Fatah founding father (1939–2009)

- Born: Yahya Habash; 10 November 1939; Bayt Dajan
- Died: 1 November 2009 (age 69); Ramallah
- Occupation: Geologist
- Years active: 1960s-2009

Yahya Sakher Habash (Arabic: صخر حبش, 10 November 1939 – 1 November 2009), also known as Abu Nizar, was one of the Fatah founding leaders.

== Early years and education ==
Habash was born in Bayt Dajan, near Jaffa, on 10 November 1939. He became a refugee in the 1948 Arab-Israeli War, ending up first in Ramallah, then in the Balata refugee camp near Nablus. He joined the Baathists in 1952. He studied geology and water resources at Ain Shams University in Cairo beginning in 1958 and later in the University of Arizona.

== Political career ==
He became a Palestinian nationalist in the early 1960s and joined Fatah in 1962, being responsible for recruitment. He was appointed Fatah regional command in Lebanon in October 1972. He went to exile with Arafat during the 1970s. Habash served as the ambassador of Palestine in the Soviet Union between 1984 and 1985. He was a member of the Fatah Central Committee from August 1989 to August 2009. He was also a writer, a poet and an artist. Habash served as the movement's general deputy of intellectual affairs.

== Death ==
He died of a stroke in the West Bank on 1 November 2009 and was survived by his wife and four children (three sons and a daughter).

== Honors ==
Habash was posthumously awarded on 5 October 2013 with the Star of Jerusalem Medal, the highest medal bestowed by the Palestinian authority.
