= Tzafria =

Moshav in central Israel

Tzafria: צפריה (Hebrew)
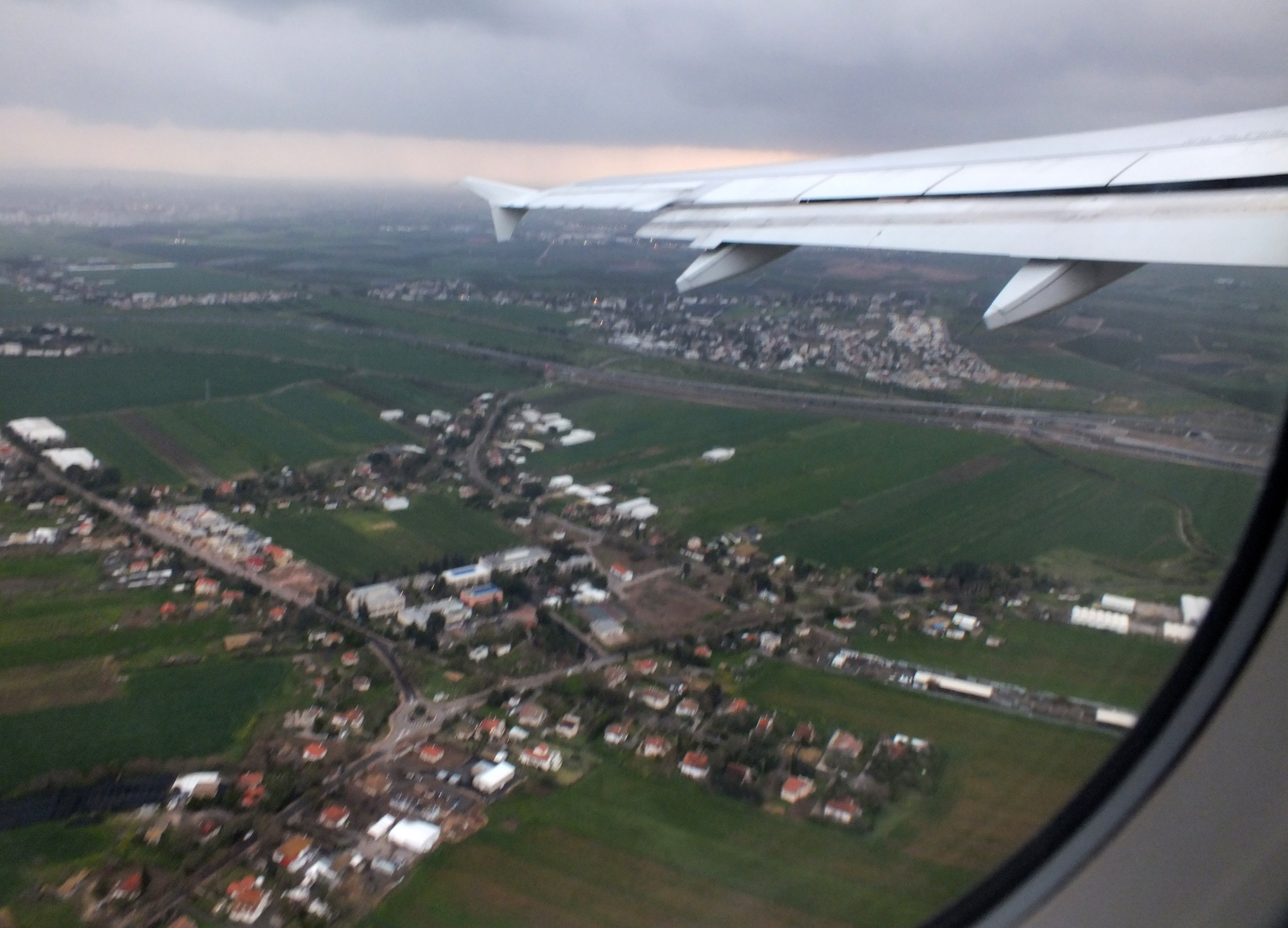

- Location within Central Israel Location within Israel
- Coordinates: 32°0′12″N 34°51′21″E
- Country: Israel
- District: Central
- Subdistrict: Ramla
- Council: Sdot Dan
- Affiliation: Hapoel HaMizrachi
- Founded: 1949
- Founder: Czechoslovak and Hungarian immigrants
- Population (2024): 1,081

Tzafria (Hebrew: צפריה) is a religious moshav in the Central District of Israel. Located near Ben Gurion International Airport, it falls under the jurisdiction of Sdot Dan Regional Council. In 2024 it had a population of 1,081.

== History ==
During the Ottoman period the area of Tzafria belonged to the nahiyeh (sub-district) of Lod. The kibbutz is located near the depopulated Arab Palestinian village of al-Safiriyya.

The kibbutz was founded in 1949 by immigrants from Czechoslovakia and Hungary. Its name is derived from that of the former Arab village; it was initially called Safria Alef and then Kfar Tzafria before adopting its current name.
