= Shagrir =

Shagrir (Hebrew: שגריר) is a Hebrew-language surname. Notable people with the surname include:

- Iris Shagrir (born 1963), Israeli historian
- Micha Shagrir (1937–2015), Israeli filmmaker
- Oron Shagrir (born 1961), Israeli Israeli philosopher and cognitive scientist

== See also ==
- Sharir
