= Ahi'ezer =

Moshav in central Israel

Ahi'ezer: אחיעזר (Hebrew)
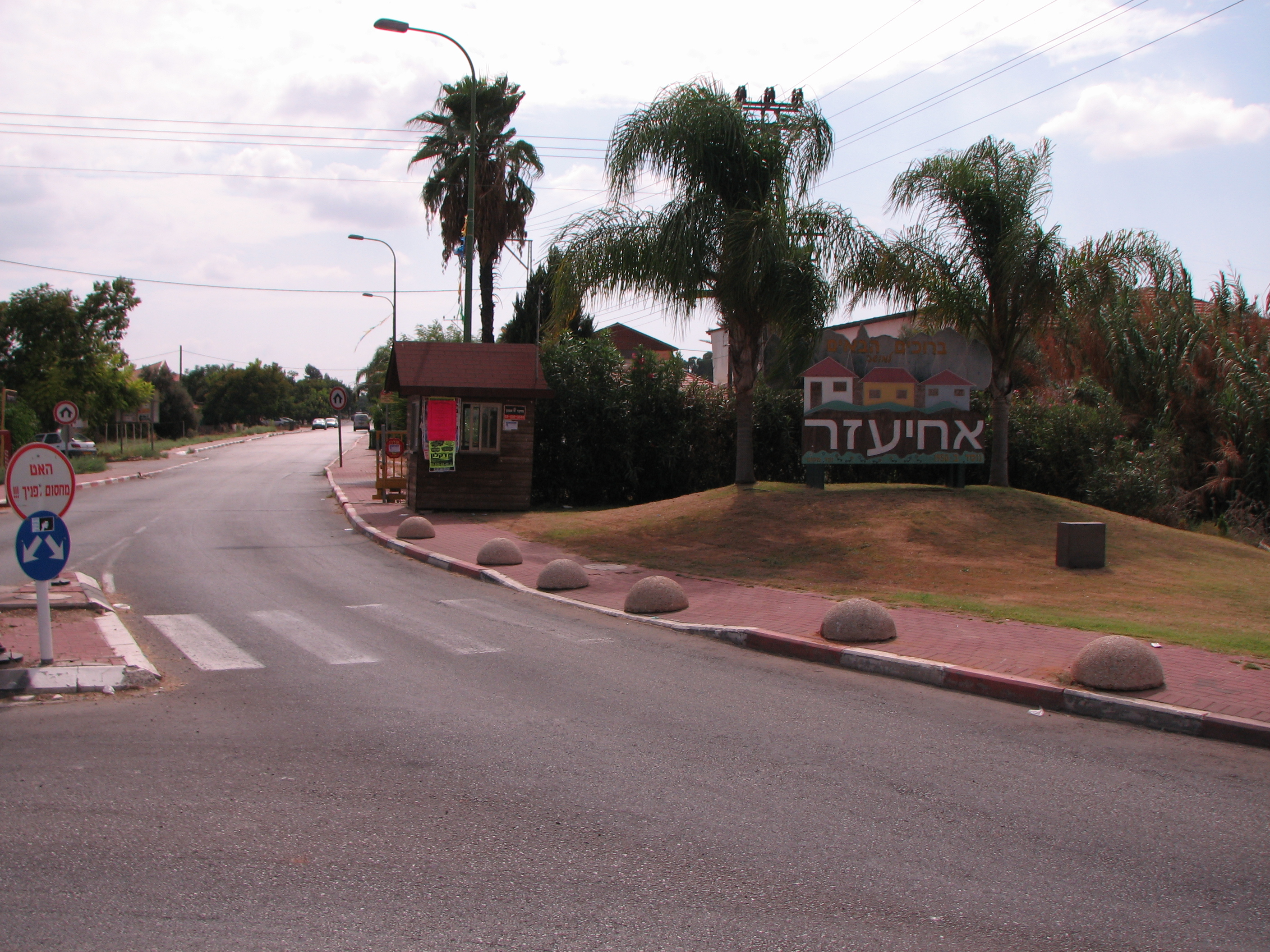

- Location within Central Israel
- Coordinates: 31°58′48″N 34°52′20″E
- Country: Israel
- District: Central
- Subdistrict: Ramla
- Council: Sdot Dan
- Affiliation: Moshavim Movement
- Founded: 27 June 1950
- Founder: Yemenite Jews
- Population (2024): 2,335

Ahi'ezer (Hebrew: אחיעזר) is a national religious moshav in the Central District of Israel. Located near Lod, it falls under the jurisdiction of Sdot Dan Regional Council. In 2024 it had a population of 2,335.

== History ==
During the Ottoman period, the area of Ahi'ezer belonged to the Nahiyeh (sub-district) of Lod that encompassed the area of the present-day city of Modi'in-Maccabim-Re'ut in the south to the present-day city of El'ad in the north, and from the foothills in the east, through the Lod Valley to the outskirts of Jaffa in the west. This area was home to thousands of inhabitants in about 20 villages, who had at their disposal tens of thousands of hectares of prime agricultural land.

The village was founded on agricultural land near the depopulated Palestinian village of al-Safiriyya on 27 June 1950 by immigrants from Al Bayda' in Yemen. It was named for the biblical figure Ahiezer, who was the chief of the tribe of Dan which previously lived in the area (Numbers 1:12; 10:25).
