= Sharir =

Sharir (Hebrew: שריר) is a Hebrew surname. Notable people with the surname include:

- Avraham Sharir (1932–2017), Israeli politician
- Gili Sharir (born 1999), Israeli Olympic bronze medalist judoka
- Limor Schreibman-Sharir (born 1954), Israeli writer and politician, and 1973 Miss Israel
- Micha Sharir (born 1950), Israeli mathematician and computer scientist

== See also ==
- Shagrir
