= Al-Sawalima =

Former village in Jaffa, Mandatory Palestine

Al-Sawalima السوالمة
- Village
- Etymology: es Sûâlimîyeh, the ruin of the Sâlem family
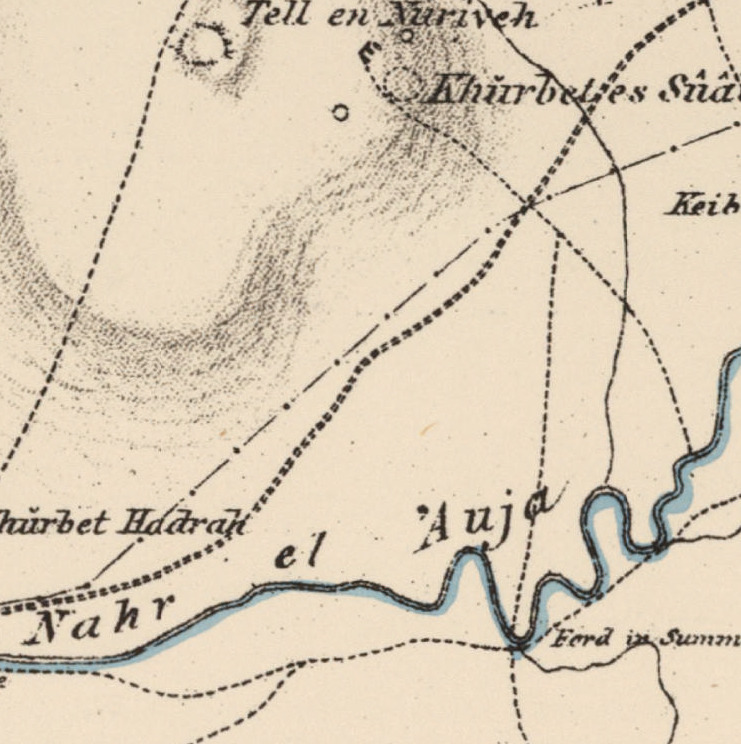
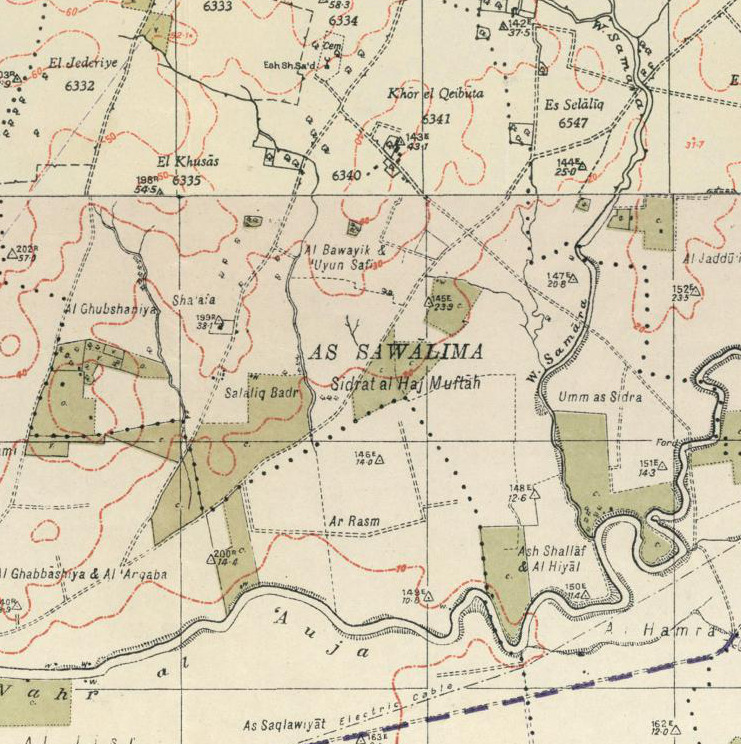
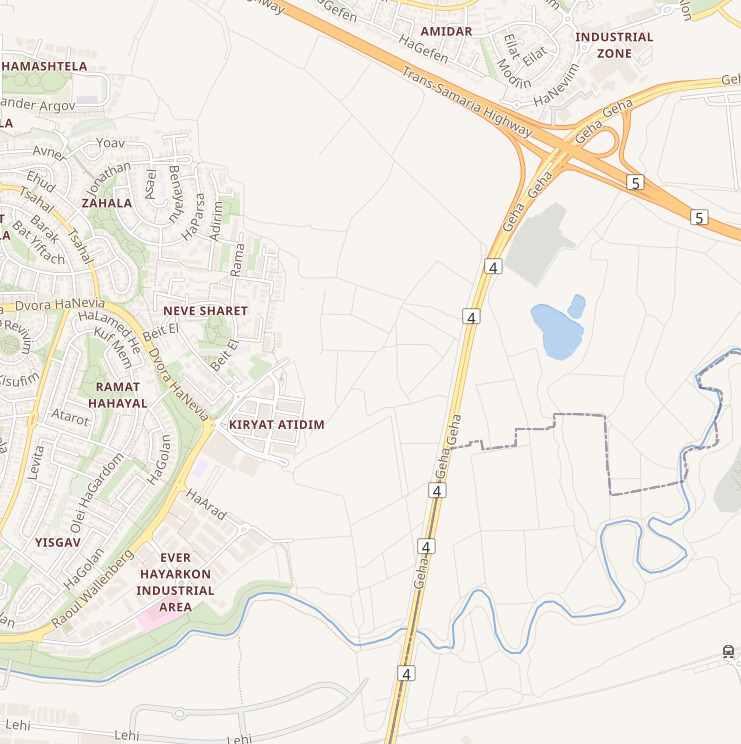
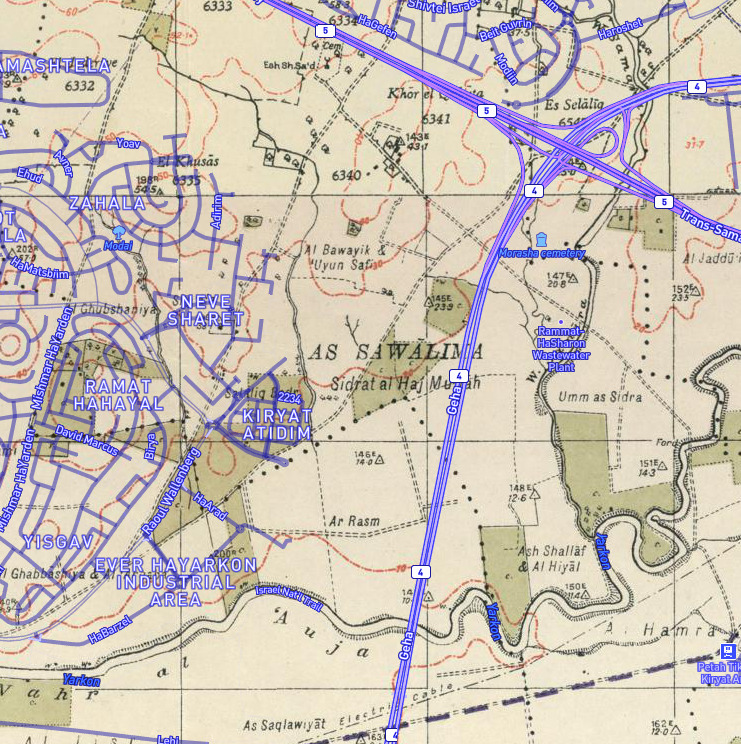
- 1870s map 1940s map modern map 1940s with modern overlay map A series of historical maps of the area around Al-Sawalima (click the buttons)

- Location within Mandatory Palestine
- Coordinates: 32°06′59″N 34°50′51″E
- Palestine grid: 134/170
- Geopolitical entity: Mandatory Palestine
- Subdistrict: Jaffa
- Date of depopulation: March 30, 1948

Population (1945)
  - Total: 800
- Cause(s) of depopulation: Fear of being caught up in the fighting
- Secondary cause: Influence of nearby town's fall
- Current Localities: Neve Sharett

Al-Sawalima was a Palestinian Arab village in the Jaffa Subdistrict. It was depopulated during the 1947–1948 Civil War in Mandatory Palestine on March 30, 1948. It was located 11 km northeast of Jaffa, situated 2 km north of the al-'Awja River.

== History ==
In 1882 the PEF's Survey of Western Palestine noted at Khurbet es Sualimiyeh: “Traces of ruins only.“

=== British Mandate era ===
In the 1922 census of Palestine conducted by the British Mandate authorities, Sawalmeh had a population of 70 Muslims, increasing in the 1931 census when Es-Sawalmeh had 429 Muslim inhabitants.

In the 1945 statistics, the village had a population of 800 Muslims, while the total land area was 5,942 dunams, according to an official land and population survey. Of the land area, a total of 894 were used for growing citrus and banana, 191 were for plantations and irrigable land, 4,566 for cereals, while 291 dunams were classified as non-cultivable areas.

Al-Sawalima had an elementary school for boys founded in 1946, with 31 students.

=== 1948 and aftermath ===
Benny Morris gives "Fear of being caught up in the fighting" and "Influence of nearby town's fall" as reasons for why the village became depopulated on March 30, 1948.

In 1992 the village site was described: "Cactuses grow on the village site. No identifiable traces of the former dwellings (tents or adobe houses) remain. Only the remnants of the one-room school are discernable. A highway runs past the north side of the site."

== Bibliography ==
- Barron, J. B., ed. (1923). Palestine: Report and General Abstracts of the Census of 1922. Government of Palestine.
- Conder, C.R.; Kitchener, H. H. (1882). The Survey of Western Palestine: Memoirs of the Topography, Orography, Hydrography, and Archaeology. Vol. 2. London: Committee of the Palestine Exploration Fund.
- Department of Statistics (1945). Village Statistics, April, 1945. Government of Palestine.
- Hadawi, S. (1970). Village Statistics of 1945: A Classification of Land and Area ownership in Palestine. Palestine Liberation Organization Research Center. Archived from the original on 2018-12-08.
- Khalidi, W. (1992). All That Remains: The Palestinian Villages Occupied and Depopulated by Israel in 1948. Washington D.C.: Institute for Palestine Studies. ISBN 0-88728-224-5.
- Mills, E., ed. (1932). Census of Palestine 1931. Population of Villages, Towns and Administrative Areas. Jerusalem: Government of Palestine.
- Morris, B. (2004). The Birth of the Palestinian Refugee Problem Revisited. Cambridge University Press. ISBN 978-0-521-00967-6.
- Palmer, E. H. (1881). The Survey of Western Palestine: Arabic and English Name Lists Collected During the Survey by Lieutenants Conder and Kitchener, R. E. Transliterated and Explained by E.H. Palmer. Committee of the Palestine Exploration Fund.
