= Haseki Sultan Imaret =

Ottoman charity in Palestine

Coordinates: 31.77881°N 35.23215°E

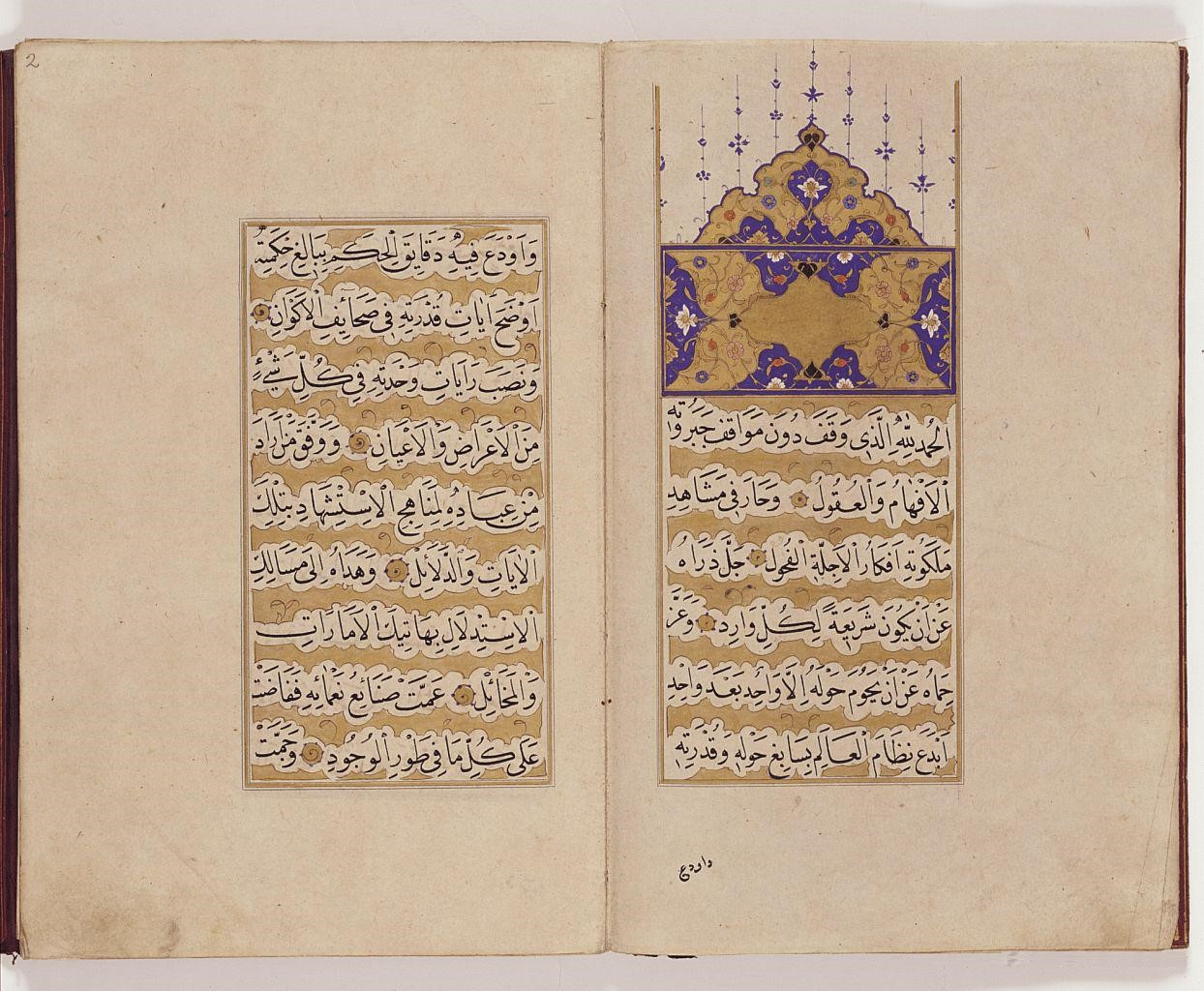
The Endowment Charter of Hürrem Sultan mentions the Haseki Hürrem Sultan Mosque, Madrasa and Imaret, CE 1556-1557 (AH 964).

Haseki Sultan Imaret was an Ottoman public soup kitchen established in Jerusalem to feed the poor during the reign of Suleiman the Magnificent. The imaret was part of a massive Waqf complex built in 1552 by Haseki Hürrem Sultan, better known in the West as Roxelana, the favorite wife of Sultan Suleiman I. This soup kitchen was said to have fed at least 500 people twice a day.

== Haseki Sultan Waqf complex ==
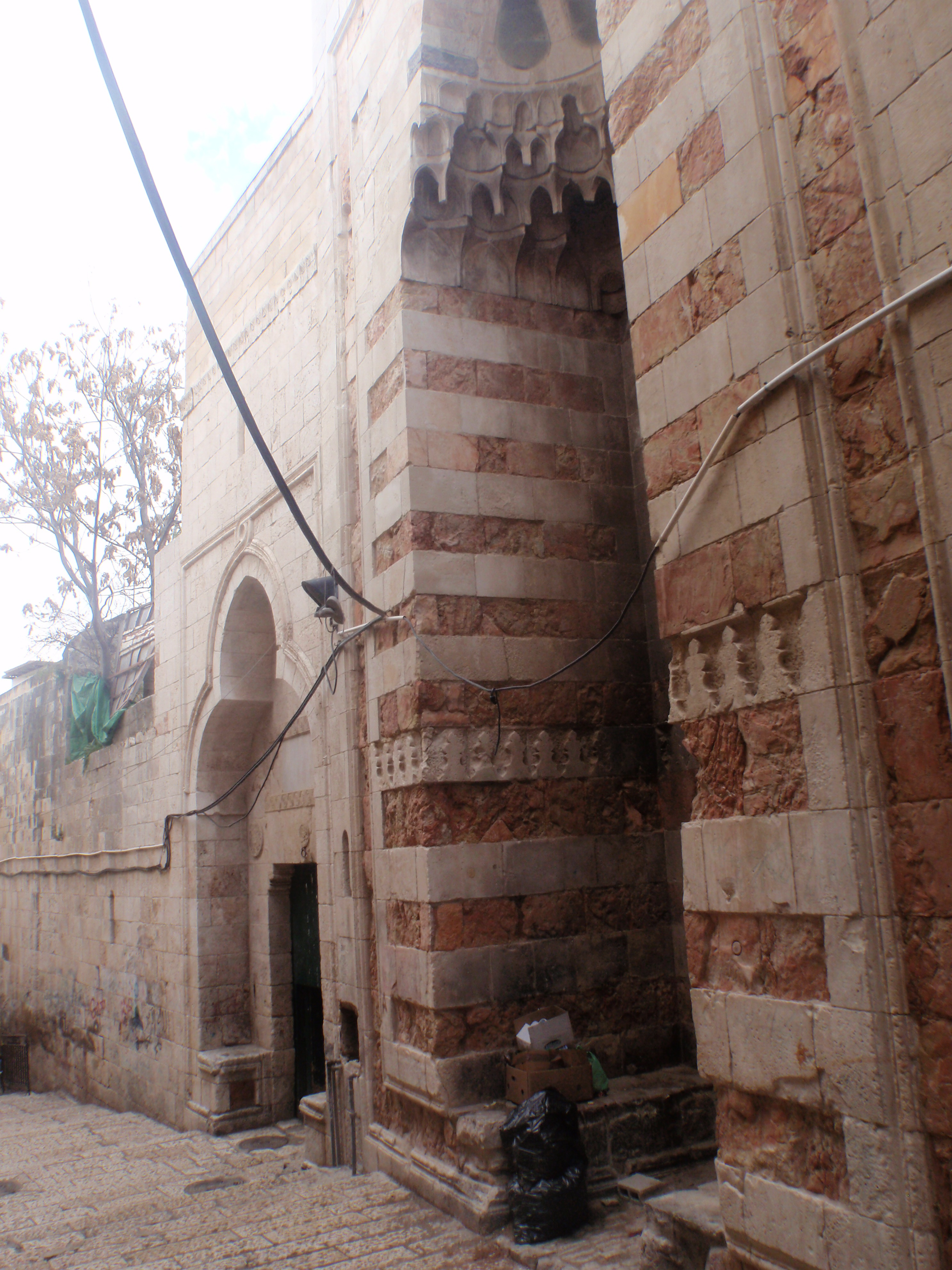
The imaret's north door (left) and the red-and-white former palace of Lady Tunshuk.

The Haseki Sultan waqf complex was constructed at the height of the Ottoman era. In addition to the soup kitchen, the complex consisted of a mosque, a 55-room pilgrim hospice, and an inn (khan) for travellers.

== Economic significance ==
With the consent of her husband, Haseki Hürrem Sultan used the revenues from various assets to build and maintain it. These assets included land in Palestine and Tripoli, as well as shops, public bath houses, soap factories, and flourmills. Haseki Hürrem Sultan's endowment deed includes 195 topoynyms and 32 estates mainly along the road between Jaffa and Jerusalem. When villages were endowed, the percentage of their revenues formerly paid in taxes was redirected to the waqf. The villages whose revenues paid for Haseki Sultan Imaret were Bait Dajan, Yazur, Kafr Ana, Ludd, Anaba, Jib, Bethlehem, Beit Jala Qaqun, among others. The Haseki Sultan Imaret not only fulfilled the religious requirement to give charity, but reinforced the social order and helped the Ottoman Empire project a political image of power and generosity.

== Religious significance ==
Charity is an important component in Islam. In order to secure a place in paradise after death, one must assist those who cannot help themselves. There are two categories of charity in Qur'anic injunctions: Zakat, an obligatory alms tax for Muslims who obtained a certain level of wealth; and Sadaqah, voluntary donations that are highly recommended. One of the most popular forms of Sadaqa was waqfs, or endowments. Waqfs were founded by wealthy individuals, especially members of the imperial family, who donated their properties to permanently benefit a variety of charitable institutions. Public soup kitchens, therefore, were waqfs that provided basic nutritional sustenance for people in need. In the case of Haseki Sultan Imaret, Hürrem Sultan built a soup kitchen in Jerusalem because it was considered a holy city, along with Hebron, Mecca and Medina.

== Social implications ==
Like other imarets throughout the Ottoman Empire, the Haseki Sultan Imaret was a tool for maintaining social order. The administrators, employees and beneficiaries of the imaret represented the social hierarchy of the community. The administrators were often members of the local noble families, and had the power to recruit friends, relatives and free slaves as employees of the imaret. Social status determined the order and amount of food distribution. During the meal, employees were the first to receive a ladle of soup and two loaves of bread, followed by the guests, who received one ladle and one loaf, and then the poor, who received the smallest amount of food. There was also a hierarchy among the poor: the learned poor ate first, followed by the men, and finally the women and children. If the food ran out, the women and children remained unfed. Consequently, the imaret not only revealed the social hierarchy of Jerusalem, but was an effective method of keeping people in line.

== Political implications ==
There were strong political motives for building a soup kitchen in Jerusalem. It was "an integral component of the Ottoman project of settlement, colonization, legitimization and urban development." The Haseki Sultan Imaret demonstrated the far-reaching strength and power of the Ottoman Empire and was also an effective means of controlling its subjects in Jerusalem. By granting the administrator position to the most important families of Jerusalem, the Sultan used the extensive influences and connections of the nobles to strengthen their rule in the local population. Nevertheless, dependence on nobles to maximize political control also had a detrimental effect on the maintenance of the imaret.

The Jerusalem imaret was among five sponsored by the royal couple, the other four also being built in cities central to the projection of Ottoman power: at Istanbul (Constantinople) and Edirne (Adrianople) they stood at the seats of the Ottoman dynasty, while two were established at the Muslim Holy Places, Mecca and Medina. The first mosque complex was built in Istanbul in 1537–1539, right after the 1536 execution of grand vizier Ibrahim Pasha, for which Roxelana was rumoured to have been the instigator, and the intention was certainly to improve her image. Jerusalem had a symbolic importance for all Muslims beyond its modest size due to its connection to Muhammad, and Suleyman had an interest in making his mark in this city only recently conquered by his father from the Mamluks, who had embellished it with numerous sumptuous institutions and buildings. Christian pilgrims to Jerusalem might have been another intended target, but they proved to be hard to impress.

== Later abuse ==
Heavy Ottoman reliance on the noble families granted them significant authority in the operations of the imaret, which constituted more than "just another poor-relief institution, but also a special fund used for granting benefits to certain favourite people." Administrators manipulated the criteria for becoming a beneficiary to favour their friends and relatives, or to gain favour from others. Additionally, the rights to being a beneficiary were transferable, further compounding the problem of excessive beneficiaries. Eventually, the imaret supported even the richest families in Jerusalem. Moreover, these powerful beneficiaries used their status to exploit the financial and material resources of the institution. For instance, a legal document in 1782 mentioned that a mercenary army commander was entitled to 48 loaves of bread from the imaret daily. By the 18th century, the corruption was so widespread that the imaret was no longer economically viable. Attempts to reduce food distributions and beneficiaries were met with fierce opposition and blatant disregard. Throughout the rest of its rule, the Ottoman Empire struggled to "find the delicate balance between the need to cut down and restrict the number of the waqf's beneficiaries, and the wish to collect the maximum political gain by granting benefits to the greatest possible number of people." Despite these problems, the Haseki Sultan Imaret continued to function, although not always to the benefit of the intended beneficiaries, "the poor and wretched, weak and needy."

By the time of British colonial rule in Palestine, the public kitchen and bakery were still functioning.

== See also ==
- List of Friday mosques designed by Mimar Sinan

== Bibliography ==
- Baer, Gabriel (1997). "The Waqf as a Prop for the Social System (Sixteenth-Twentieth Centuries)" (PDF). Islamic Law and Society. 4 (5). BRILL: 264–297. doi:10.1163/1568519972599752. JSTOR 3399362. Archived from the original (PDF) on 17 April 2018.
- Finkel, Caroline (2012) [2006]. Osman's Dream: The Story of the Ottoman Empire, 1300-1923. Hachette UK. ISBN 978-1848547858. Suleiman's and Hürrem Sultan's Jerusalem imaret is referred to here.
- Peri, Oded (1992). "Waqf and Ottoman Welfare Policy: The Poor Kitchen of Hasseki Sultan in Eighteenth-Century Jerusalem". Journal of the Economic and Social History of the Orient. 35 (2). Brill: 167–186.
- Singer, Amy (2002). Constructing Ottoman Beneficence: An Imperial Soup Kitchen in Jerusalem. Albany: State University of New York Press. ISBN 0-7914-5352-9.
- Singer, Amy (2005). "Serving Up Charity: The Ottoman Public Kitchen". Journal of Interdisciplinary History. 35 (3). MIT Press: 481–500. doi:10.1162/0022195052564252. S2CID 145715799.
