= Ijlil al-Qibliyya =

Ijlil al-Qibliyya إجليل القبلية Jalil al-Qibliyya
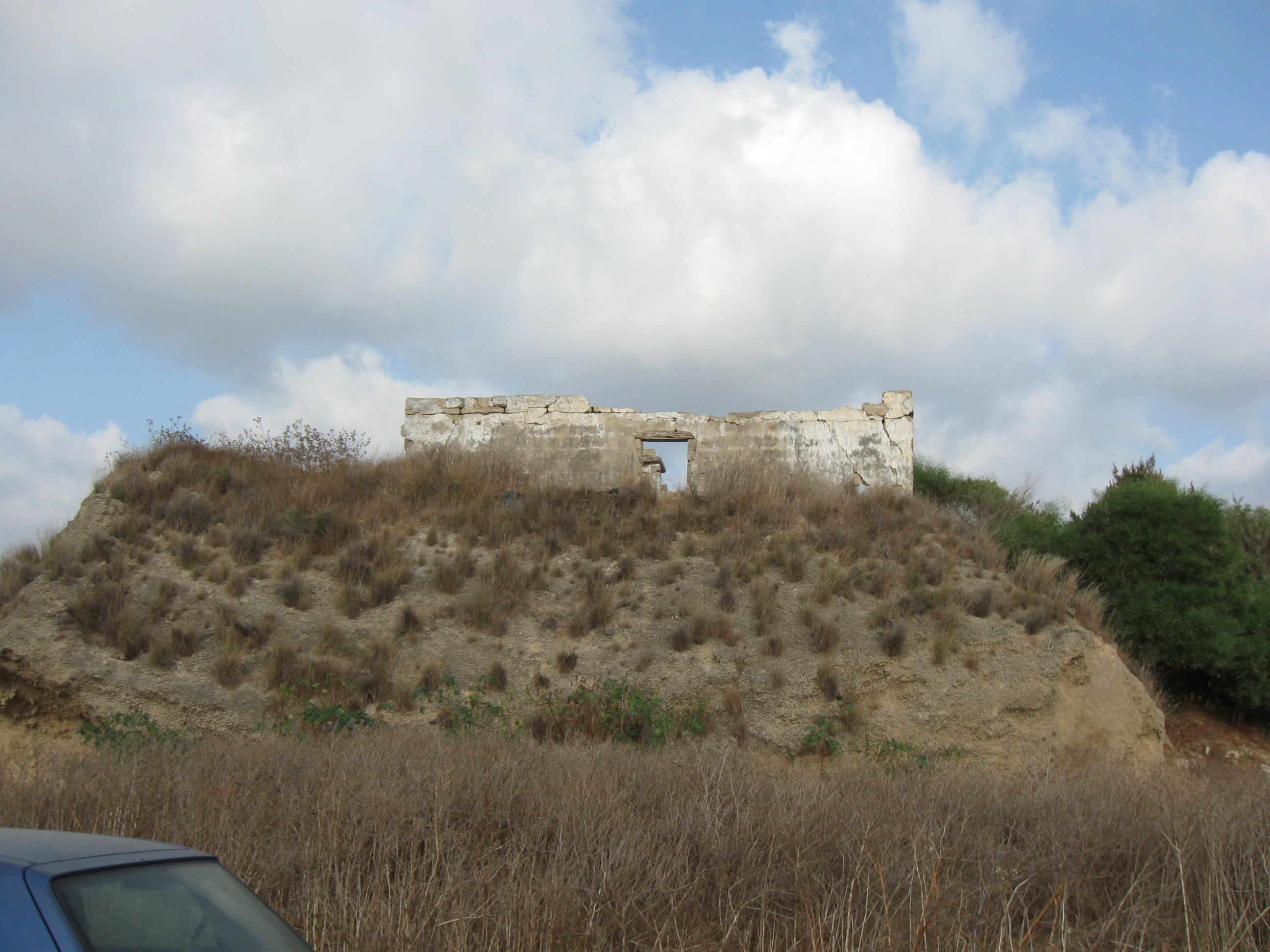
- Remains of Ijlil al-Qibliyya, in 2010
- Etymology: El Jelil, meaning "illustrious/grand" (Ar), or "a district/circuit"(He)
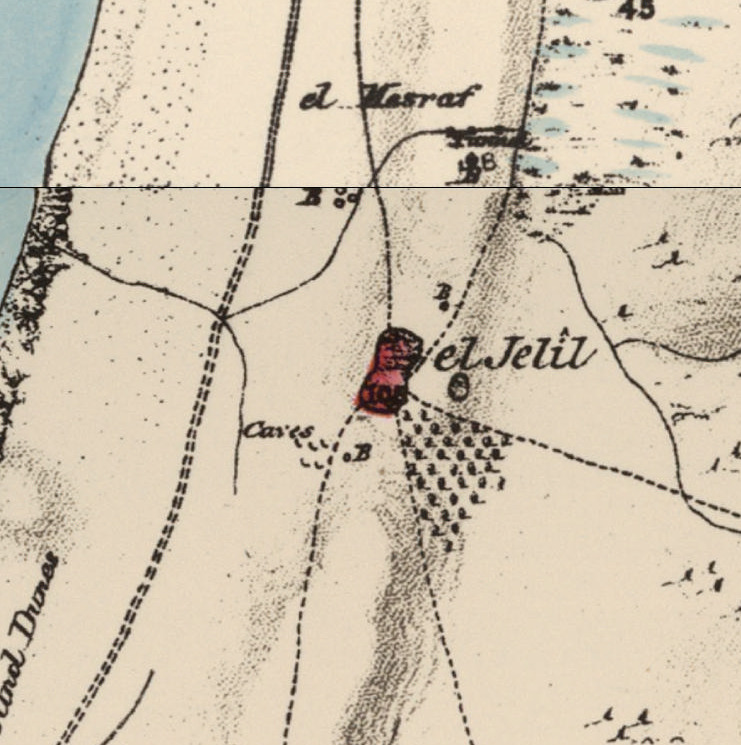
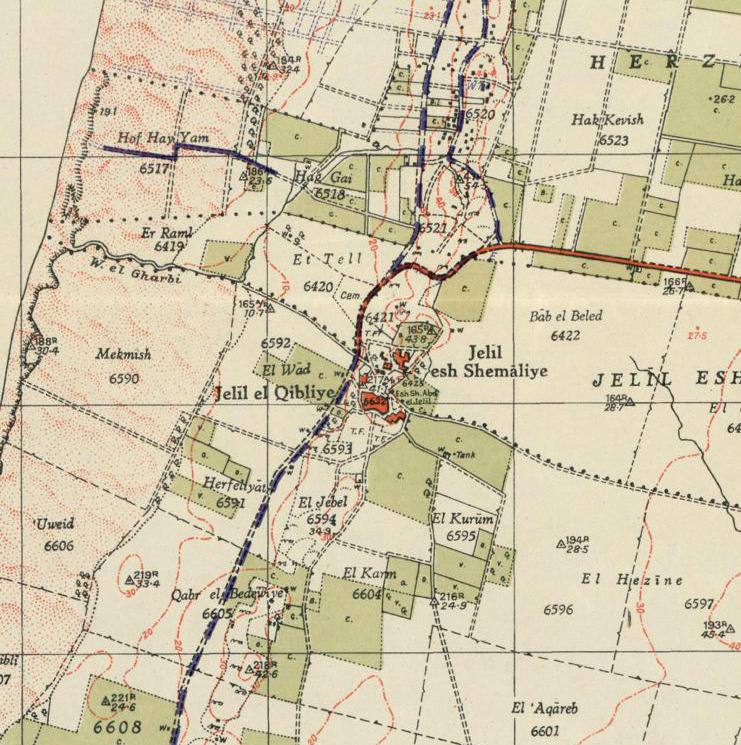
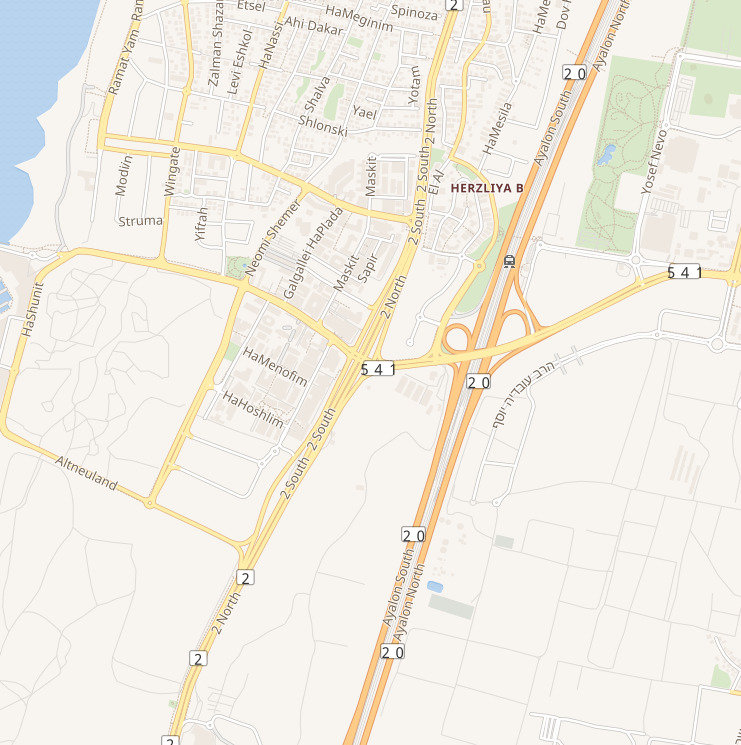
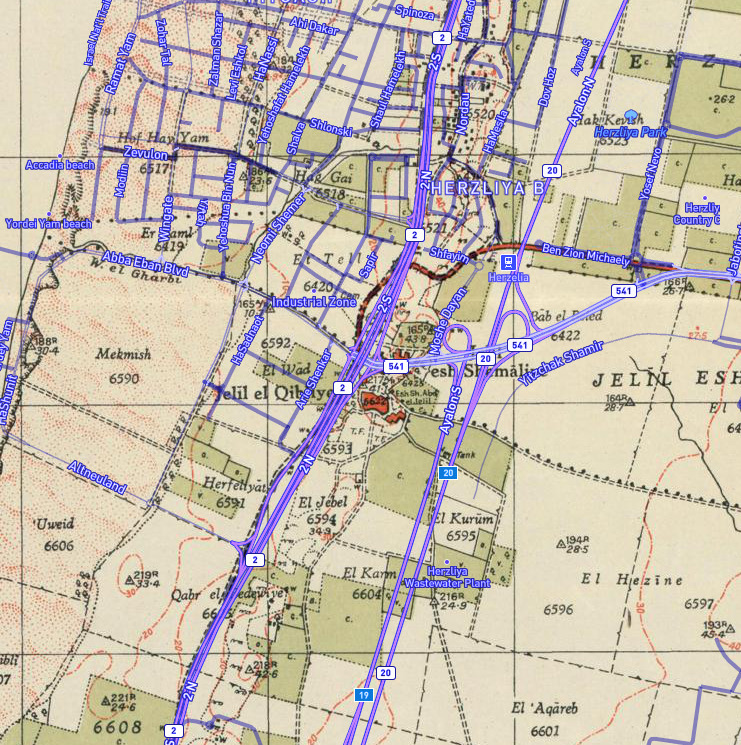
- 1870s map 1940s map modern map 1940s with modern overlay map A series of historical maps of the area around Ijlil al-Qibliyya (click the buttons)

- Location within Mandatory Palestine
- Coordinates: 32°09′36″N 34°48′42″E
- Palestine grid: 132/174
- Geopolitical entity: Mandatory Palestine
- Subdistrict: Jaffa
- Date of depopulation: End of March- April 3, 1948

Area
  - Total: 8,692 dunams (8.692 km^{2}; 3.356 sq mi)

Population (1945)
  - Total: 470
- Cause(s) of depopulation: Fear of being caught up in the fighting

Ijlil al-Qibliyya, also al-Jalil, was a Palestinian Arab village in the Jaffa Subdistrict. It was depopulated during the 1947–1948 Civil War in Mandatory Palestine on April 3, 1948.

In 1945 the village has a population of 680, 210 of which were Jewish. Ijlil al-Qibliya was named after al-Shaykh Salih 'Abd al-Jalil, whose maqam was located in the village.

== Location ==
Ijlil al-Qibliyya, (meaning "Southern Ijlil"), was located on a hilltop, 13 km (8 mi) northeast of Jaffa, and about 100 meters southwest of its sister village, Ijlil al-Shamaliyya ("Northern Jilil").

== History ==
Foundation of the village

Ijlil was one of four Ottoman-era villages founded near the coast north of the Yarkon River (along with the villages of Al-Shaykh Muwannis, Al-Haram, and Umm Khalid).

The original inhabitants of Ijlil came from Hajjah in the Samarian Hills. In 1670, groups of the al-Jubārāt beduins settled in the village and gradually displaced most of the earlier residents, who relocated to coastal plain villages such as Ijlil and al-Shaykh Muwannis, established on waqf lands of Sayyidna ʿAlī under the authority of the al-Jayyusi family who resided for a time at Hajjah. According to historian Roy Marom, the establishment of Ijlil "demonstrates that the expansion of settlement in the southern Sharon was the result of the internal expansion of the core settlement by residents of the mountainous highlands of Samaria, and not by Egyptian ‘penetrators’ as previously claimed."

In June 1870, the French explorer Victor Guérin visited both villages. He described them as one village, called Edjlil, situated on a hill and divided into two districts. Together, they had 380 inhabitants. The houses were built of rammed earth or with different small aggregates mixed in with kneaded and dried silt. In 1870/1871 (1288 AH), an Ottoman census listed Ijlil in the nahiya (sub-district) of Bani Sa'b.

In 1882, the PEF's Survey of Western Palestine described the two villages, named El Jelil, as "a mud village, with a well to the south and a second to the north. [..] A small olive-grove exists to the south-east."

=== British Mandate era ===
In the 1922 census of Palestine conducted in 1922 by the British Mandate authorities, the two Ijlil villages (spelled Jelil) had a population of 154 Muslims, increasing in the 1931 census to a population of 305, still all Muslim.

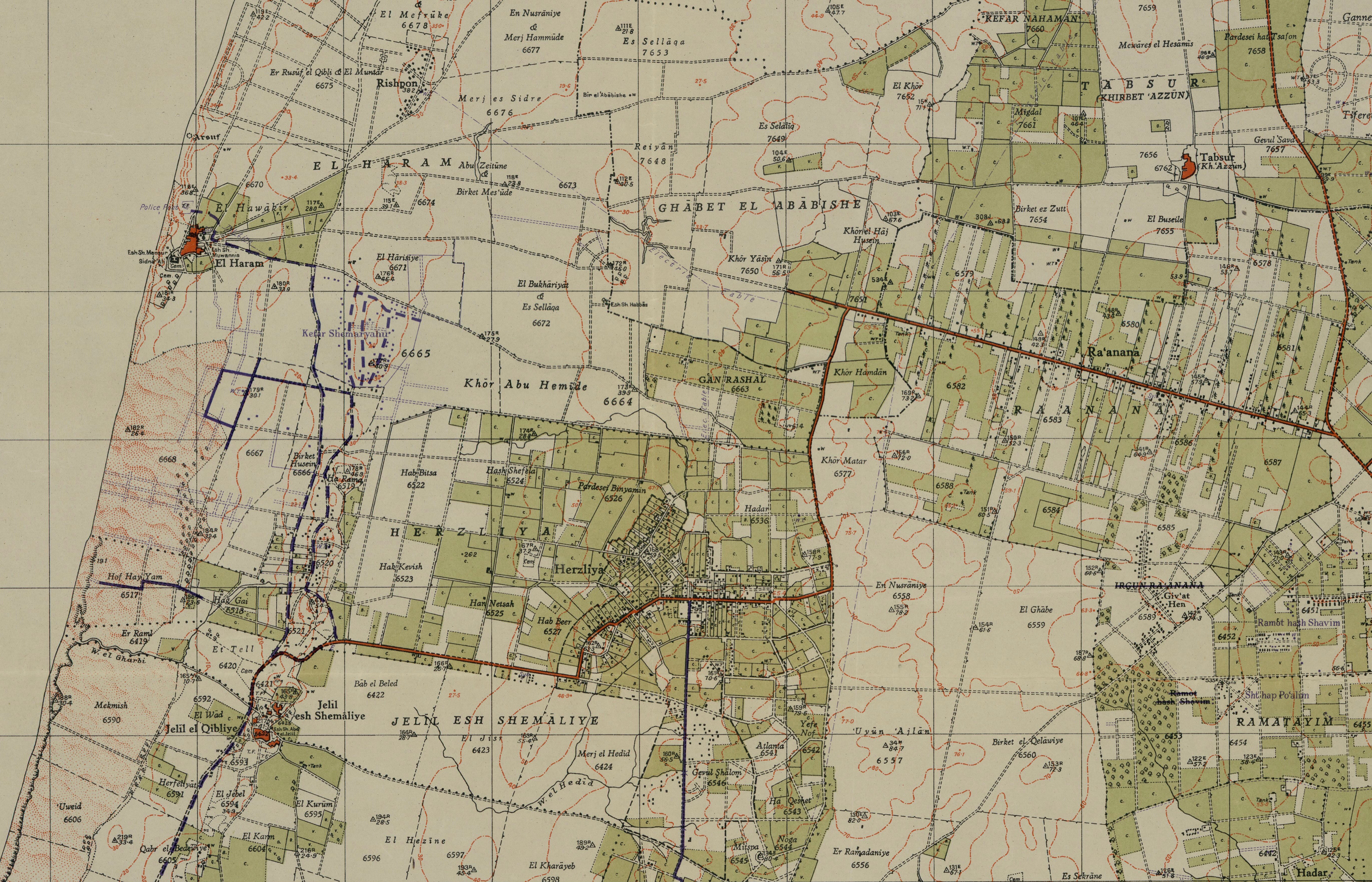
Ijlil al-Qibliyya 1942 1:20,000 (bottom left)

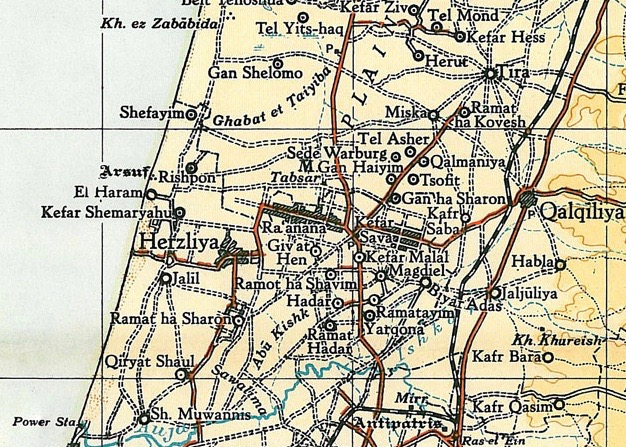
Ijlil al-Qiblilya 1945 1:250,000

In 1943, a kibbutz named Glil Yam was established on land purchased from the village by the Jewish National Fund. In the 1945 statistics the population of Ijlil al-Qibliyya was 470 Muslims and 210 Jews, with 8,692 dunams of land owned by Muslims and 5,980 by Jews, according to an official land and population survey. Of the Muslim owned land, 923 dunams were for citrus and bananas, 85 for plantations and irrigable land, 7,087 for cereals, while 6 dunams were built-up land. The kibbutz also owned 521 dunums in of the neighboring Ijlil al-Shamaliyya.

In the archive of the city of Herzliya, it is possible to find evidences to the close relationship with Ijlil, such as a greeting letter that was sent to Hajj Akhsein Al-Assi of Ijlil.

=== 1948, and aftermath ===
In December 1947 and January 1948 the leaders of al-Shaykh Muwannis, Al-Mas'udiyya, Al-Jammasin al-Sharqi/Al-Jammasin al-Gharbi, and the mukhtars of 'Arab Abu Kishk and the two Ijlil-villages met with Haganah representatives in Petah Tikva. These villages wanted peace, and promised not to harbor any Arab Liberation Armies or local Arab Militia. They further promised that, in the case they were not able to keep them out alone, they were to call on Haganah for help.

By mid-March 1948, the Alexandroni Brigade had imposed isolation, a "quarantine", of al-Shaykh Muwannis, 'Arab Abu Kishk and the two Ijlil-villages. However, on 12 March Lehi kidnapped 5 village notables from al-Shaykh Muwannis. This completely undermined the villagers trust in former agreements, and many left. The people of the two Jalil villages also left, after asking Jewish neighbours to look after their property.

From 26 May 1948, the abandoned villages housed a POW camp; after the end of the war, it was converted to a ma'abara named Glilot after the two former villages. The ma'abara was incorporated into Herzliya from 1954, and finally dismantled in 1960. The former ma'abara gave its name to two junctions on Highway 5, to the IDF base housing Unit 8200, and to the shopping mall located at West Glilot junction.

The Palestinian historian Walid Khalidi described the village site in 1992: "The site serves as a garbage dump and the original village can hardly be identified. On the thin swath of the hill that has not yet been covered with waste, remnants of stone houses stand next to a gasoline storage tank, along with bushes and cactuses. Approximately 100m east of the tank a deserted house stands next to the remains of a razed building."

In 2004, the group Zochrot conducted tours of the two Ijlil villages. Testimony of former residents was conducted.
