= Al-Jammasin al-Gharbi =

Al-Jammasin al-Gharbi الجمْاسين الغربي
- Village
- Etymology: The western buffalo breeders
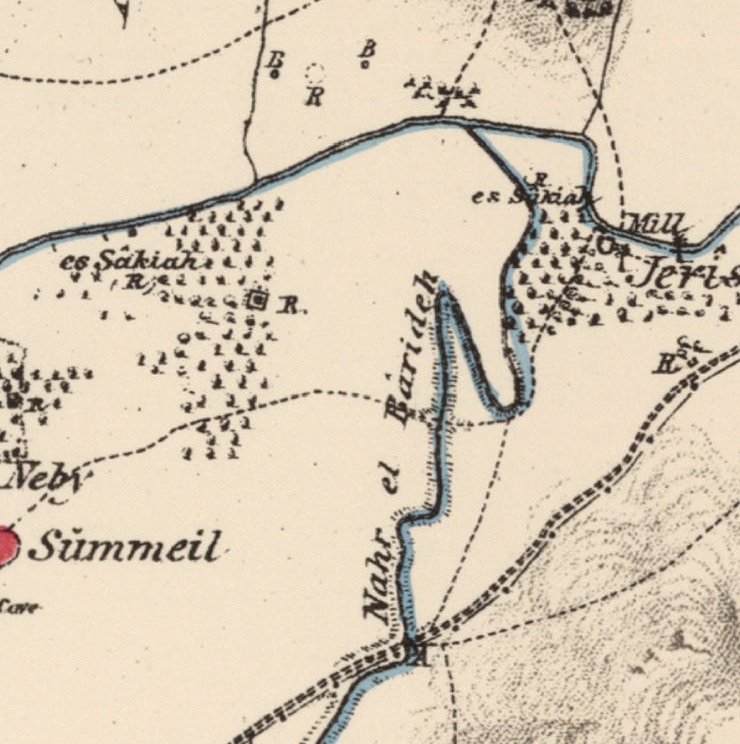
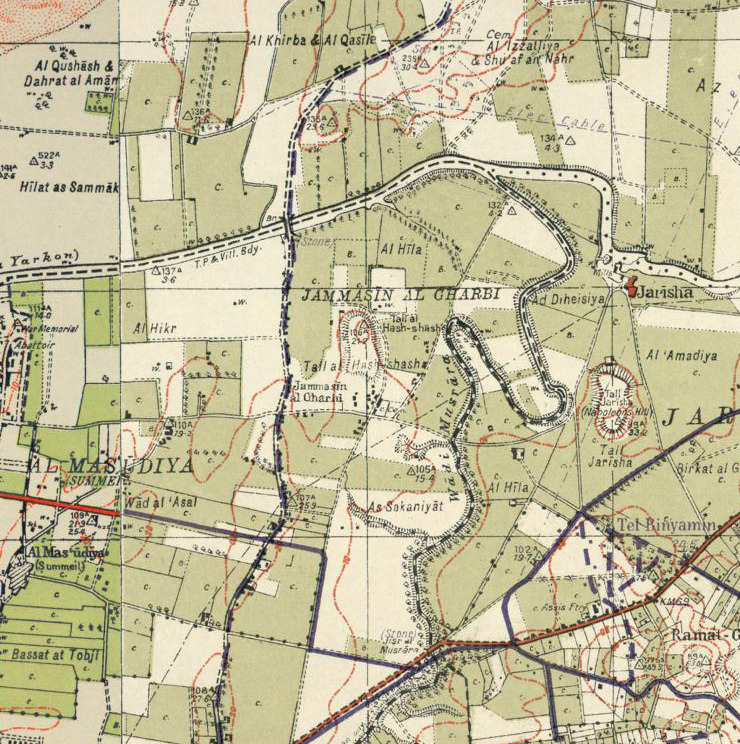
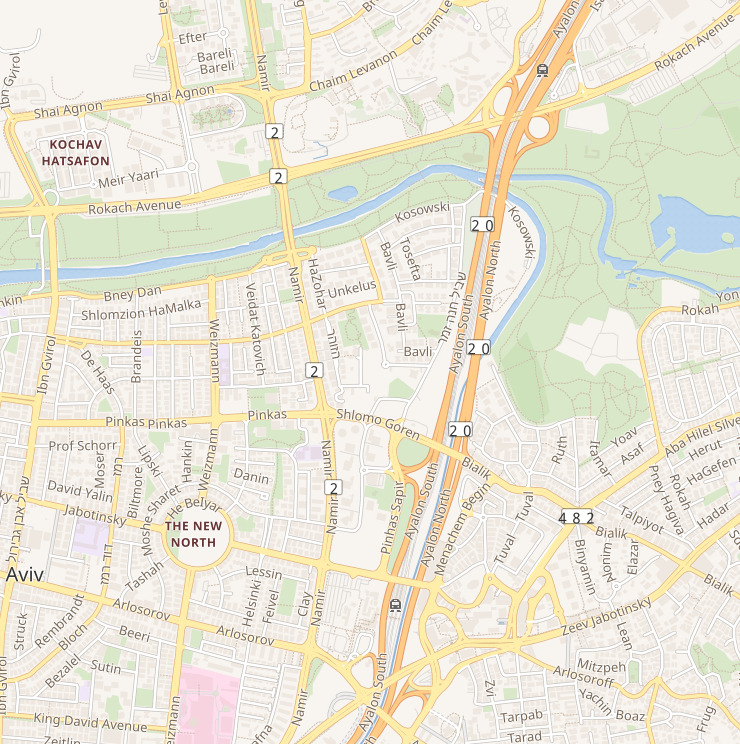
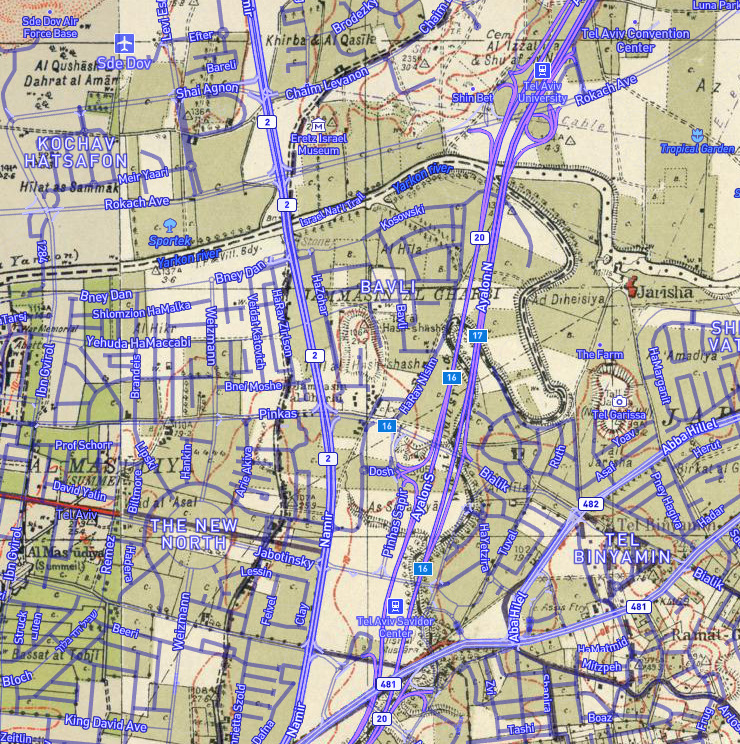
- 1870s map 1940s map modern map 1940s with modern overlay map A series of historical maps of the area around Al-Jammasin al-Gharbi (click the buttons)

- Location within Mandatory Palestine
- Coordinates: 32°05′34″N 34°47′50″E
- Palestine grid: 131/166
- Geopolitical entity: Mandatory Palestine
- Subdistrict: Jaffa
- Date of depopulation: March 17, 1948

Population (1945)
  - Total: 1,080
- Cause(s) of depopulation: Fear of being caught up in the fighting

Al-Jammasin al-Gharbi was a Palestinian Arab village in the Jaffa Subdistrict. It was depopulated during the 1947–48 Civil War in Mandatory Palestine on March 17, 1948. It was located 6.5 km northeast of Jaffa.

== Etymology ==
The name refers to the Jammasin tribe, a plural form of the Arabic word "jammas", meaning a water buffalo grower. Al-Gharbi is an adjective which means "the western", pertaining to the western part of the tribe.

== History ==
Al-Jammasin's inhabitants were known to be descendants of nomads from the Jordan Valley. In 1596, a Jammasin tribe appear in the Ottoman census, located in the Nahiya of Bani Sa'b of the Liwa of Nablus, paying taxes on water buffalos. Khalidi writes that it is not certain that this was the same tribe that settled the two Jammasin villages. The tribe was known to have settled in the area by the 18th century.

=== British Mandate era ===
In the 1922 census of Palestine conducted by the British Mandate authorities, the tribal area of Jammasin had a population of 200 Muslims, while in the 1931 census Jammasin el-Gharbiya had 566 Muslim inhabitants.

In the 1945 statistics the population of Al-Jammasin al-Gharbi consisted of 1,080 Muslims and the total land area was 1,365 dunams of land, according to an official land and population survey. Of this land, Arabs used 202 dunams for citrus and bananas, 151 for plantations and irrigable land, 173 for cereals, while a total of 149 dunams were non-cultivable areas.

The children attended school on Al-Shaykh Muwannis.

=== 1948, aftermath ===
In December, 1947, Jewish agents reported that Arabs were leaving the Al-Jammasin villages. In December 1947 and January 1948 the leaders of al-Shaykh Muwannis, Al-Mas'udiyya, Al-Jammasin al-Sharqi/Al-Jammasin al-Gharbi, and the mukhtars of Ijlil al-Qibliyya, Ijlil al-Shamaliyya and Abu Kishk met with Haganah representatives in Petah Tikva. These villages wanted peace, and promised not to harbor any Arab Liberation Armies or local Arab Militia. They further promised that, in the case they were not able to keep them out alone, they were to call on Haganah for help. The Jammasin villages, together with Abu Kishk, also jointly approached a Jewish police officer at Ramat Gan.

== Bibliography ==
- Barron, J.B., ed. (1923). Palestine: Report and General Abstracts of the Census of 1922. Government of Palestine.
- Esber, R. (2008). Under the Cover of War, The Zionist Expulsions of the Palestinians. Arabicus Books & Media. ISBN 978-0981513171.
- Government of Palestine, Department of Statistics (1945). Village Statistics, April, 1945.
- Hadawi, S. (1970). Village Statistics of 1945: A Classification of Land and Area ownership in Palestine. Palestine Liberation Organization Research Center. Archived from the original on 2018-12-08.
- Hütteroth, W.-D.; Abdulfattah, K. (1977). Historical Geography of Palestine, Transjordan and Southern Syria in the Late 16th Century. Erlanger Geographische Arbeiten, Sonderband 5. Erlangen, Germany: Vorstand der Fränkischen Geographischen Gesellschaft. ISBN 3-920405-41-2.
- Khalidi, W. (1992). All That Remains: The Palestinian Villages Occupied and Depopulated by Israel in 1948. Washington D.C.: Institute for Palestine Studies. ISBN 0-88728-224-5.
- Mills, E., ed. (1932). Census of Palestine 1931. Population of Villages, Towns and Administrative Areas. Jerusalem: Government of Palestine.
- Morris, B. (2004). The Birth of the Palestinian Refugee Problem Revisited. Cambridge University Press. ISBN 978-0-521-00967-6.
