= Abu Kishk =

Abu Kishk ابو كشْك
- Village
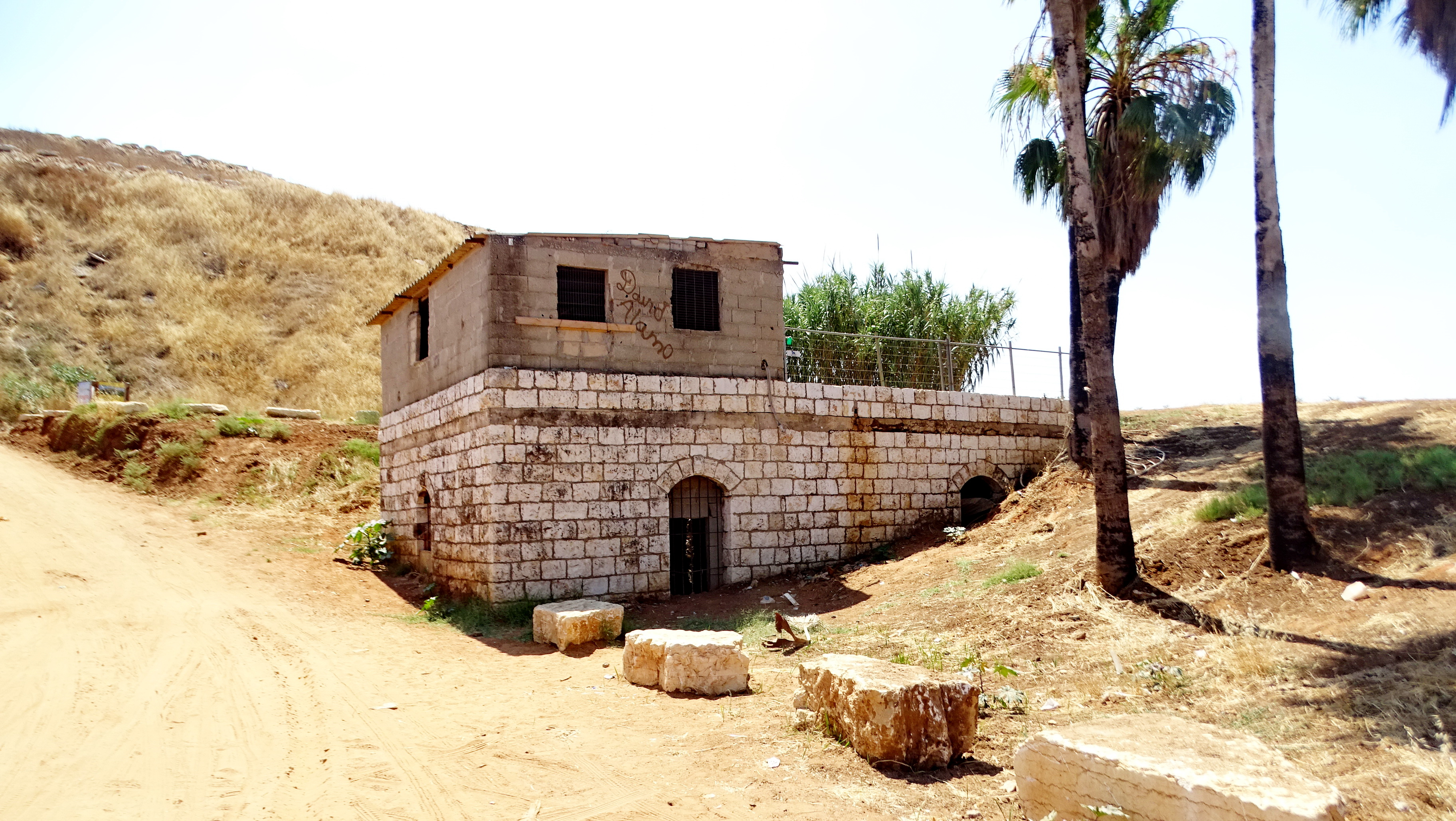
- Old school of Abu Kishk

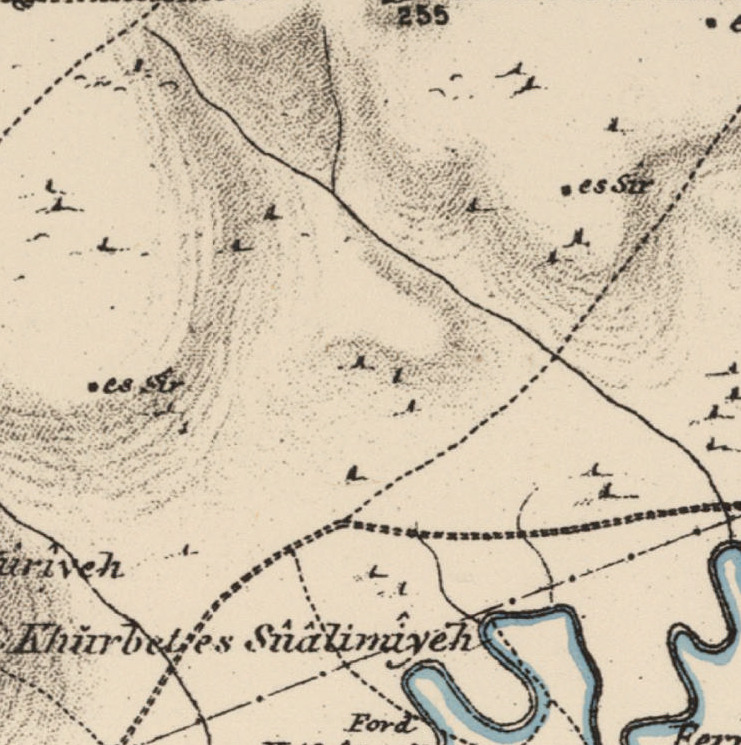
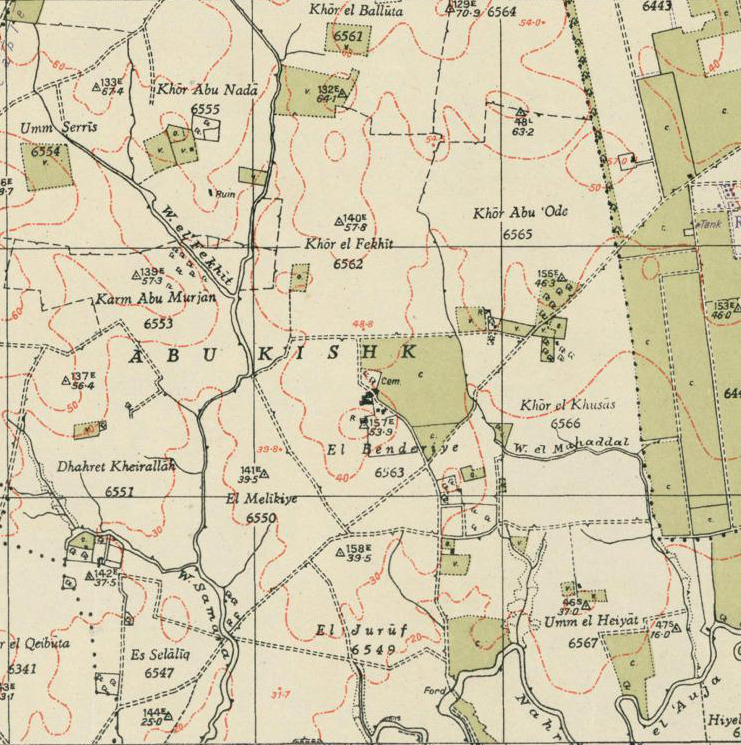
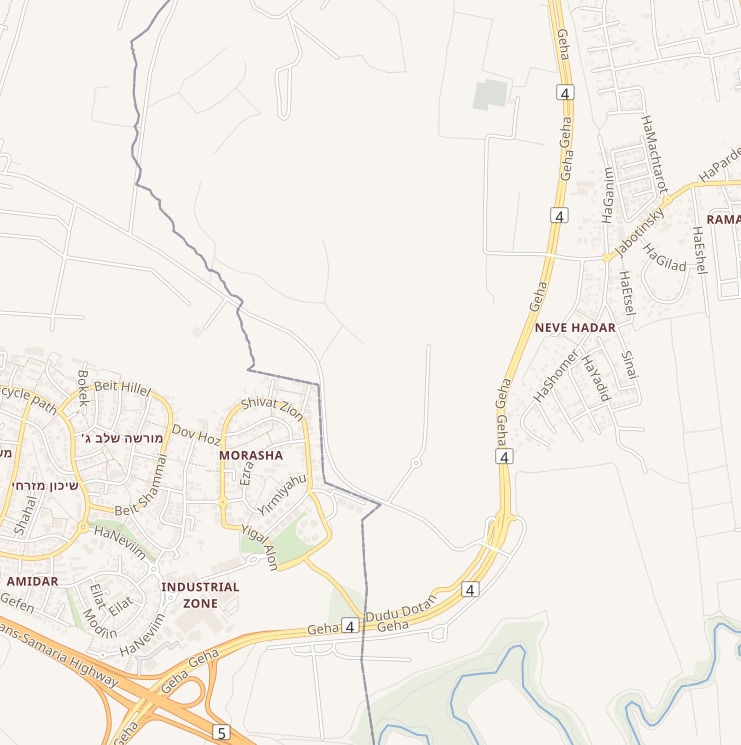
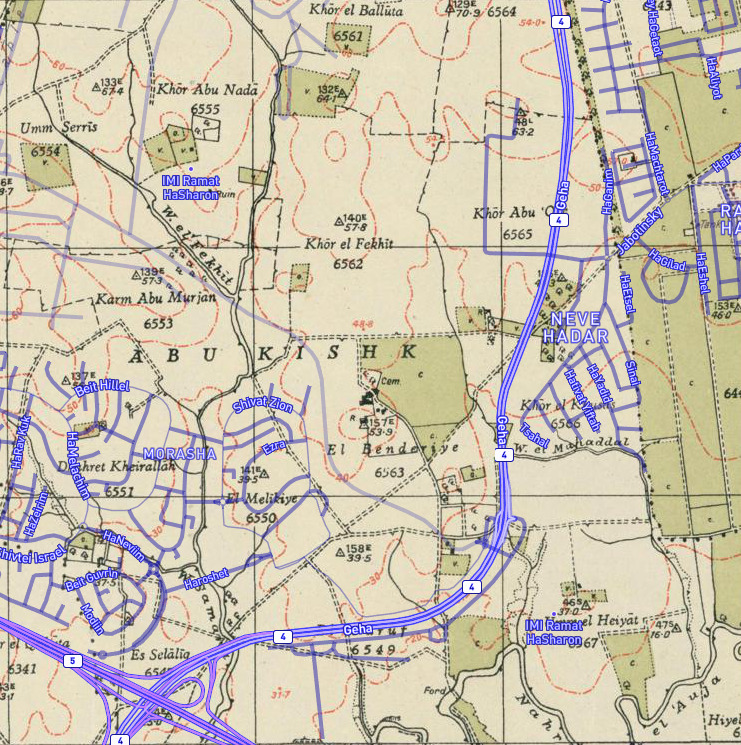
- 1870s map 1940s map modern map 1940s with modern overlay map A series of historical maps of the area around Abu Kishk (click the buttons)

- Location within Mandatory Palestine
- Coordinates: 32°8′11″N 34°51′55″E
- Palestine grid: 136/170
- Geopolitical entity: Mandatory Palestine
- Subdistrict: Jaffa
- Date of depopulation: 30 March 1948

Area
  - Total: 17,121 dunams (17.121 km^{2}; 6.610 sq mi)

Population (1945)
  - Total: 1,900
- Cause(s) of depopulation: Fear of being caught up in the fighting
- Secondary cause: Influence of nearby town's fall
- Current Localities: Herzliya

Abu Kishk (Arabic: أبو كشك) was a Palestinian village in the Jaffa Subdistrict located 12 km northeast of Jaffa, situated 2 km northwest of the Yarkon River. The village was depopulated during the 1947–1948 Civil War in Mandatory Palestine on 30 March 1948 by the Irgun.

In 1945 the population of the village was about 1,900; about 300 of them lived in the area that later became Herzliya after the establishment of the state of Israel.

== Location ==
The village was situated about 2 kilometers (1.2 mi) northwest of the Yarkon River. Secondary roads linked it to the Jaffa-Haifa highway and to neighboring villages.

== History ==
=== British Mandate of Palestine ===
In 1925 the village school was founded. By the mid-1940s it had 108 students, including 9 girls.

At the time of the 1931 census, Abu Kishk had a population of 1007 residents, all Muslims.

In the 1945 statistics Abu Kishk had 1,900 Muslim residents, who owned a total of 17,121 dunams of land. A total of 2,486 dunums of village land was used for citrus or bananas, 14,018 was planted with cereals; while 226 dunums were irrigated or used for orchards.

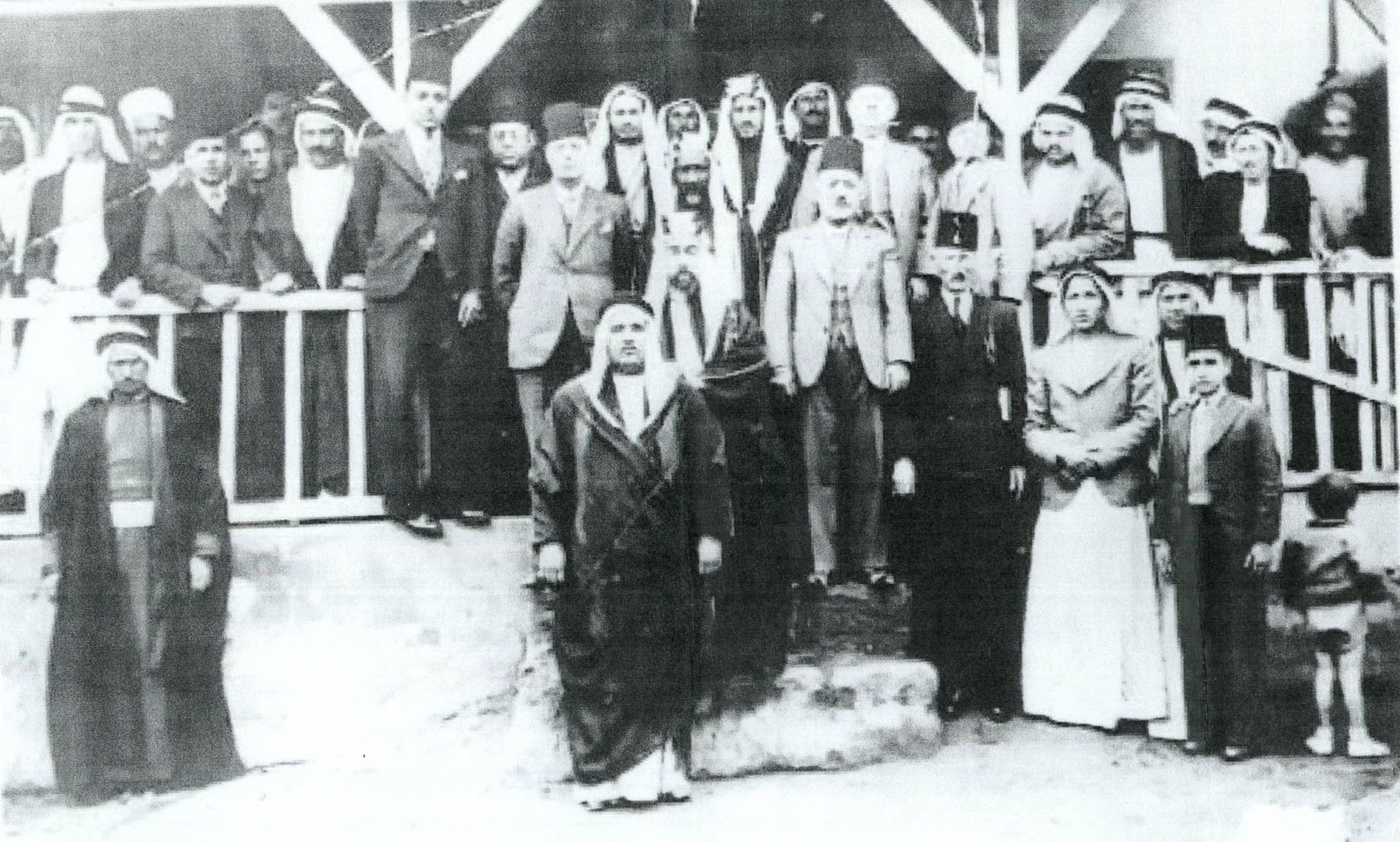
Seif Eddid AbuKish and prince, (later king) Abdullah I of Jordan

=== 1948 Palestine war ===
In December 1947 and January 1948 the leaders of al-Shaykh Muwannis, Al-Mas'udiyya, Al-Jammasin al-Sharqi/Al-Jammasin al-Gharbi, and the mukhtars of Ijlil al-Qibliyya, Ijlil al-Shamaliyya and Abu Kishk met with Haganah representatives in Petah Tikva. These villages wanted peace and promised not to harbor any Arab Liberation Armies or local Arab Militia. They further promised that, in the case they were not able to keep them out alone, they were to call on Haganah for help.

By mid-March 1948, the Alexandroni Brigade had imposed isolation, a "quarantine," of al-Shaykh Muwannis, Ijlil al-Qibliyya, Ijlil al-Shamaliyya and Abu Kishk. However, on 12 March LHI kidnapped 5 village notables from al-Shaykh Muwannis. This completely undermined the villagers' trust in former agreements, and many left.

== Bibliography ==
- Government of Palestine, Department of Statistics (1945). Village Statistics, April, 1945.
- Hadawi, S. (1970). Village Statistics of 1945: A Classification of Land and Area ownership in Palestine. Palestine Liberation Organization Research Center. Archived from the original on 8 December 2018.
- Khalidi, W. (1992). All That Remains: The Palestinian Villages Occupied and Depopulated by Israel in 1948. Washington, D.C.: Institute for Palestine Studies. ISBN 0-88728-224-5.
- Mills, E., ed. (1932). Census of Palestine 1931. Population of Villages, Towns and Administrative Areas. Jerusalem: Government of Palestine.
- Morris, B. (2004). The Birth of the Palestinian Refugee Problem Revisited. Cambridge University Press. ISBN 978-0-521-00967-6.
