= Jaffa Subdistrict, Mandatory Palestine =

Administrative division of British Palestine (1920–1948)

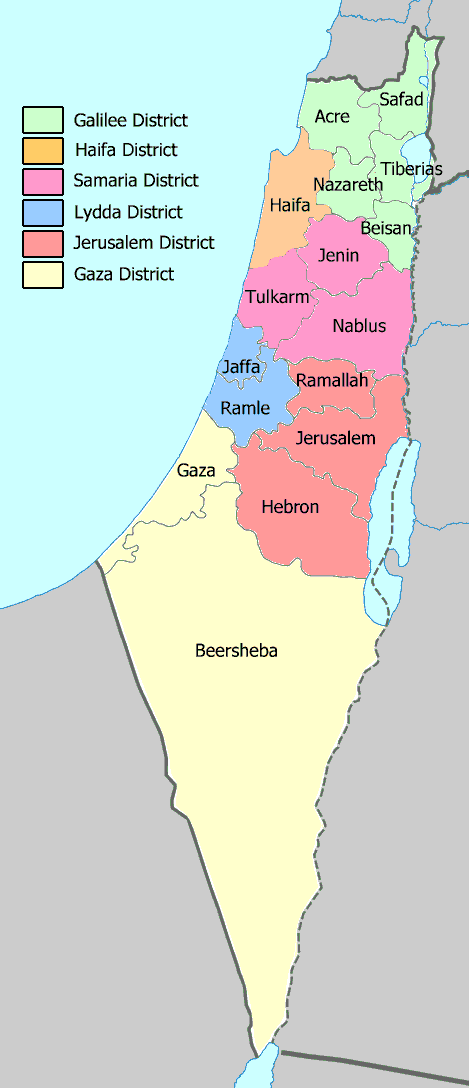
Subdistricts grouped by districts in 1945. Jaffa Subdistrict as part of Lydda District in blue.

The Jaffa Subdistrict was one of the subdistricts of Mandatory Palestine. It was located around the city of Jaffa. After the 1948 Arab-Israeli War, the district was converted almost in entirely to the Tel Aviv District in Israel.

== Towns and villages ==
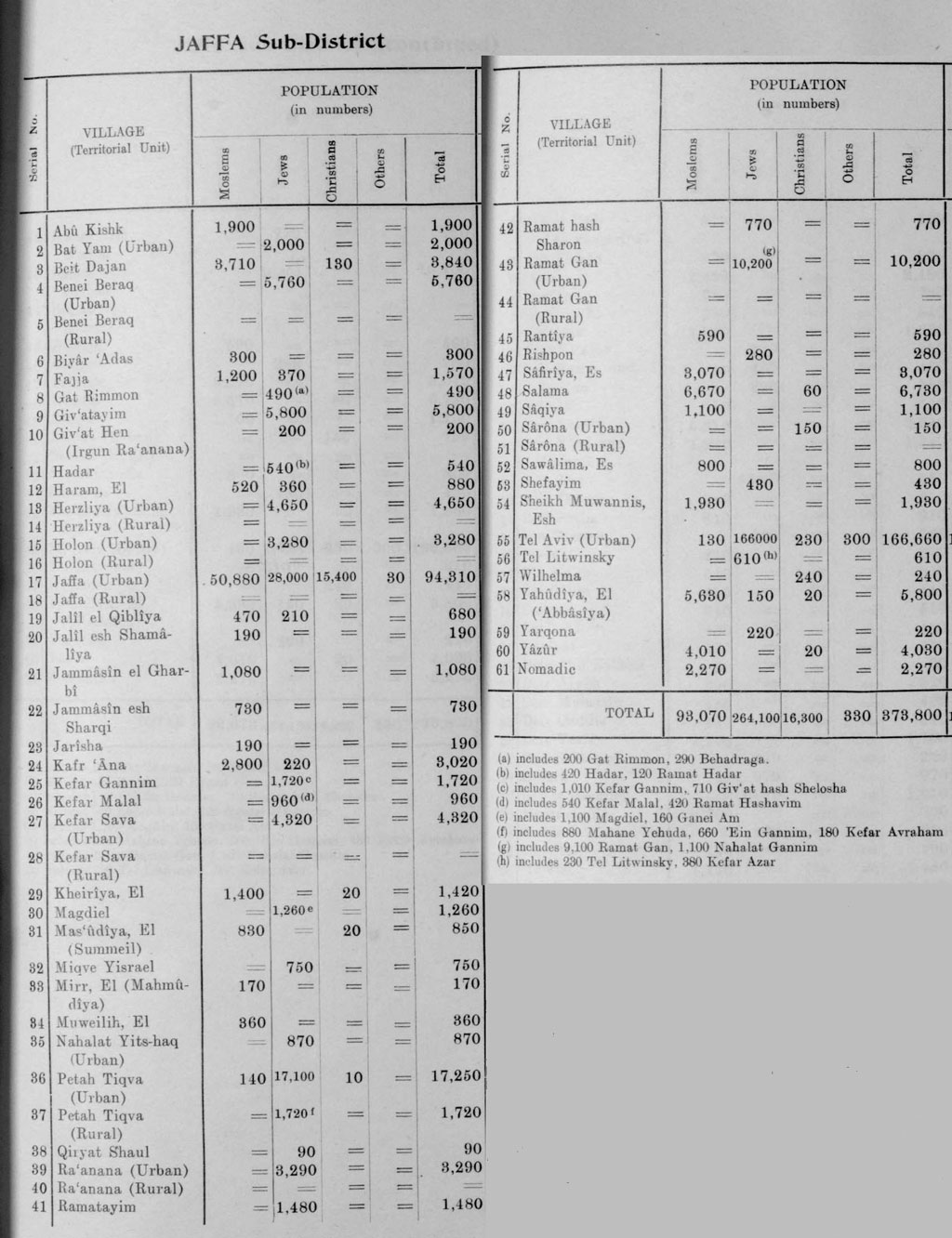
Official population statistics for the sub-district, from Village Statistics, 1945.

Jaffa Sub-District – Population by Village
Village	Muslims	Jews	Christians	Others	Total
Abu Kishk	1,900				1,900
Bat Yam (Urban)		2,000			2,000
Beit Dajan	3,710		130		3,840
Benei Beraq (Urban)		5,760			5,760
Benei Beraq (Rural)					
Biyar ‘Adas	300				300
Fajja	1,200	370			1,570
Gat Rimmon		490			490
Giv‘atayim		5,800			5,800
Giv‘at Hen (Irgun Ra‘anana)		200			200
Hadar		540			540
Haram (El)	520	360			880
Herzliya (Urban)		4,650			4,650
Herzliya (Rural)					
Holon (Urban)		3,280			3,280
Holon (Rural)					
Jaffa (Urban)	50,880	28,000	15,400	30	94,310
Jaffa (Rural)					
Jalil el Qibliya	470	210			680
Jalil esh Shamaliya	190				190
Jammasin el Gharbi	1,080				1,080
Jammasin esh Sharqi	730				730
Jarisha	190				190
Kafr ‘Ana	2,800	220			3,020
Kefar Gannim		1,720			1,720
Kefar Malal		960			960
Kefar Sava (Urban)		4,320			4,320
Kefar Sava (Rural)					
Kheiriya (El)	1,400		20		1,420
Magdiel		1,260			1,260
Mas‘udiya (El) (Summeil)	830		20		850
Miqwe Yisrael		750			750
Mirr (El) (Mahmudiya)	170				170
Muweilhi (El)	360				360
Nahalat Yitshaq (Urban)		870			870
Petah Tiqva (Urban)	140	17,100	10		17,250
Petah Tiqva (Rural)		1,720			1,720
Qiryat Shaul		90			90
Ra‘anana (Urban)		3,290			3,290
Ra‘anana (Rural)					
Ramatayim		1,480			1,480
Ramat haSharon		770			770
Ramat Gan (Urban)		10,200			10,200
Ramat Gan (Rural)					
Rantiya	590				590
Rishpon		280			280
Safiriya (Es)	3,070				3,070
Salama	6,670		60		6,730
Saqiya	1,100				1,100
Sarona (Urban)			150		150
Sarona (Rural)					
Sawalim (Es)	800				800
Shefayim		430			430
Sheikh Muwannis (Esh)	1,930				1,930
Tel Aviv (Urban)	130	166,000	230	300	166,660
Tel Litwinsky		610			610
Wilhelma			240		240
Yahudiya (El) (‘Abbasiyya)	5,630	150	20		5,800
Yarqona		220			220
Yazur	4,010		20		4,030
Nomadic	2,270				2,270
TOTAL	93,070	264,100	16,300	330	373,800

=== Depopulated towns and villages ===
- al-'Abbasiyya
- Abu Kishk
- Bayt Dajan
- Biyar 'Adas
- Fajja
- al-Haram
- Ijlil al-Qibliyya
- Ijlil al-Shamaliyya
- al-Jammasin al-Gharbi
- al-Jammasin al-Sharqi
- Jarisha
- Kafr 'Ana
- al-Khayriyya
- al-Mas'udiyya
- al-Mirr
- al-Muwaylih
- Rantiya
- al-Safiriyya
- Salama
- Saqiya
- al-Sawalima
- al-Shaykh Muwannis
- Yazur
