= Sidna Ali Mosque =

Mosque in Herzliya, Tel Aviv, Israel

- مسجد سيدنا علي
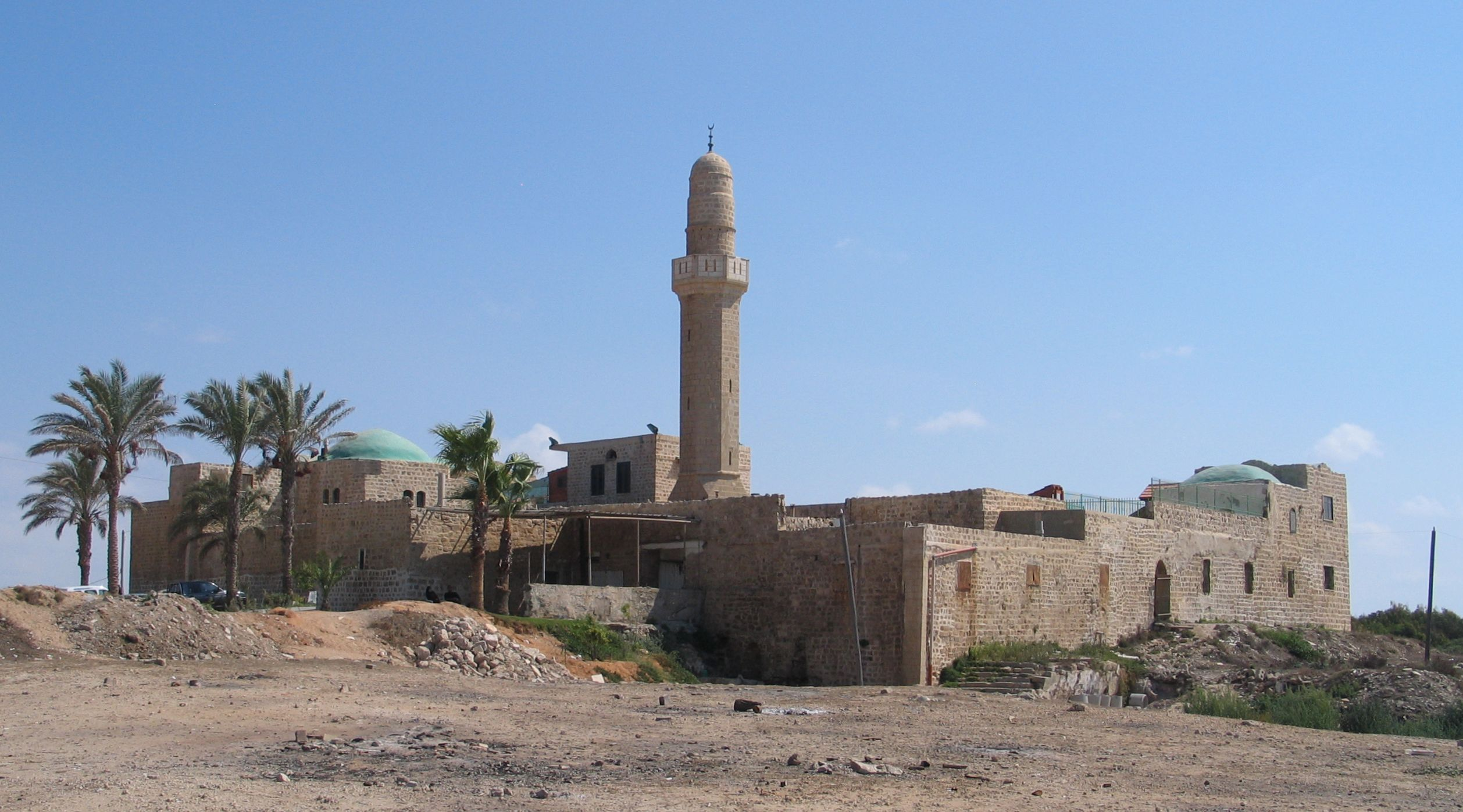

- Location of the mosque in central Israel

Religion
- Affiliation: Islam
- Ecclesiastical or organisational status: Mosque; Madrasa
- Status: Active

Location
- Location: Herzliya, Tel Aviv
- Country: Israel
- Interactive map of Sidna Ali Mosque
- Coordinates: 32°11′16.22″N 34°48′20.47″E

Architecture
- Type: Mosque architecture
- Style: Mamluk
- Completed: c. 13th–15th century (disputed)

Specifications
- Dome: One
- Minaret: One
- Shrine: One: Ali b. Alim

The Sidna 'Ali Mosque (Arabic: مسجد سيدنا علي, romanized: Masjid Sidna 'Ali; Hebrew: מסגד סידנא עלי, romanized: Misgad Sidna Ali) is a mosque located in the depopulated Palestinian village of Al-Haram on the beach in the northern part of Herzliya in central Israel. It served, as of 1998, as both a mosque and a religious school.

== Description ==
The mosque is situated around a tomb reputed to be that of a local saint, Ali b. Alim, who died in 1081 CE. Ali was described as a great scholar and miracle worker by Sultan Baybars' biographer, Muhyi al-Din (died 1292). According to Mujir al-Din, in c. 1496, the tomb was visited by Baybars in 1265 CE, who prayed for victory before retaking Arsuf from the crusaders. An annual festival was celebrated at the mosque from the 15th century until the 1940s.

The existing building contains parts of different ages of construction and repair; however, Petersen claimed that none date from before the 15th century, while Taragan identifies elements, specifically the entrance door to the minaret, which fit the style of other early Mamluk religious buildings from the 1270s-90s, noting that no written documents remain to support such an early date for the mosque. The part of the building described as the oldest in 1950 has since disappeared.

Taragan dates the construction of the vaulted arcades to sometime between the thirteenth and fifteenth centuries, with important additions made in the late 15th century, including the well, a marble monument on the tomb, and an unidentified tower. The rooms on the second floor and the inscription now placed opposite the mihrab were added. The minaret was destroyed by naval bombardment in World War I and since rebuilt. Major repair work was done in 1926, the 1950s and 1991–1992.

Since 1990, notably, due to its central location in Israel, the shrine is again a popular target for pilgrimage for Israeli Arabs from the villages of the Galilee and townspeople from places like Jaffa and Ramla, coming on Fridays to pray at the tomb and participate in different ceremonies.

== Gallery ==
The mosque in 1949

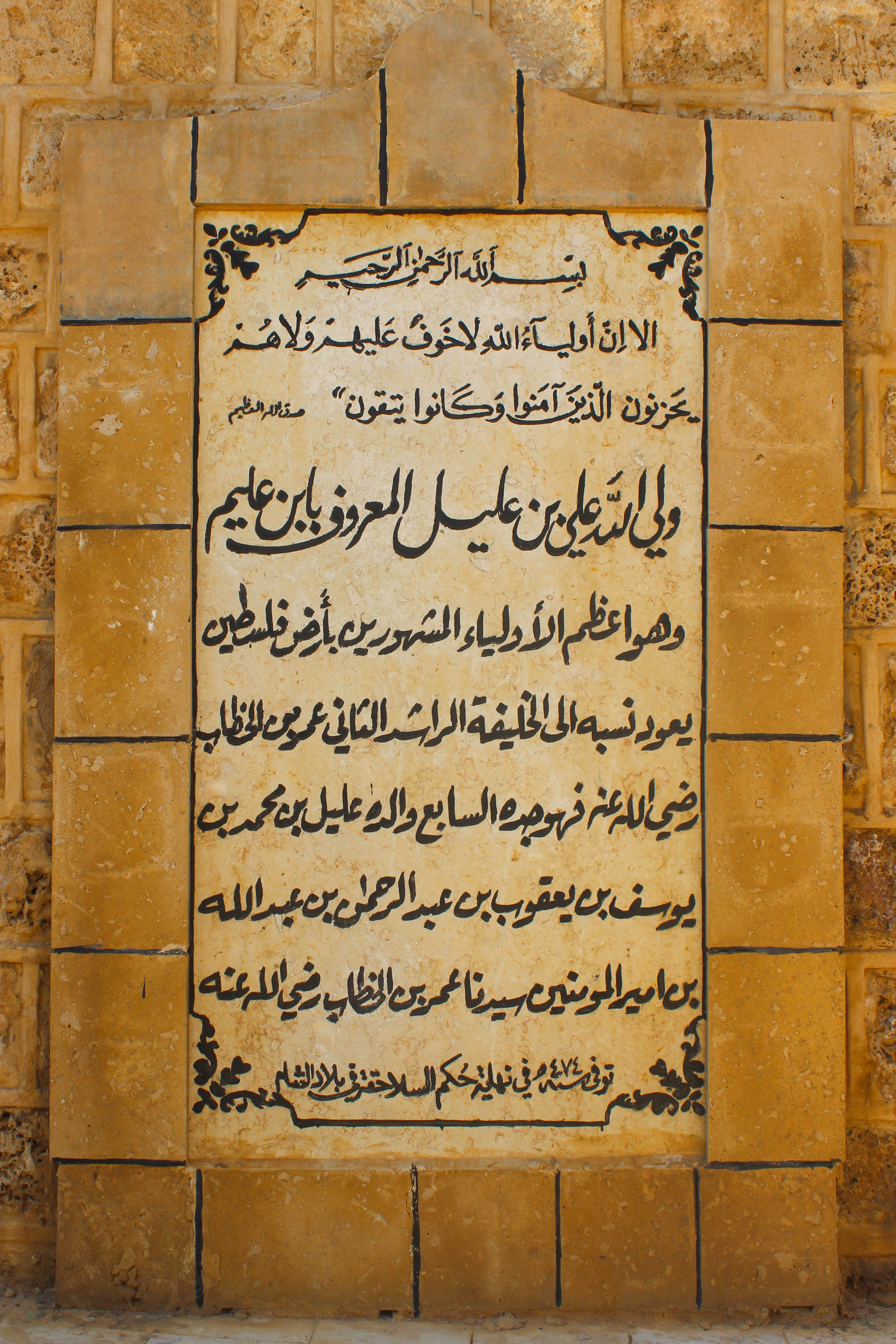

== See also ==
- Islam in Israel
- List of mosques in Israel
- Maqam (shrine), a type of Muslim shrine widely known in the Levant
