= Al-Haram, Jaffa =

Al-Haram, Sidna 'Ali الحرم سيدنا علي
- Village
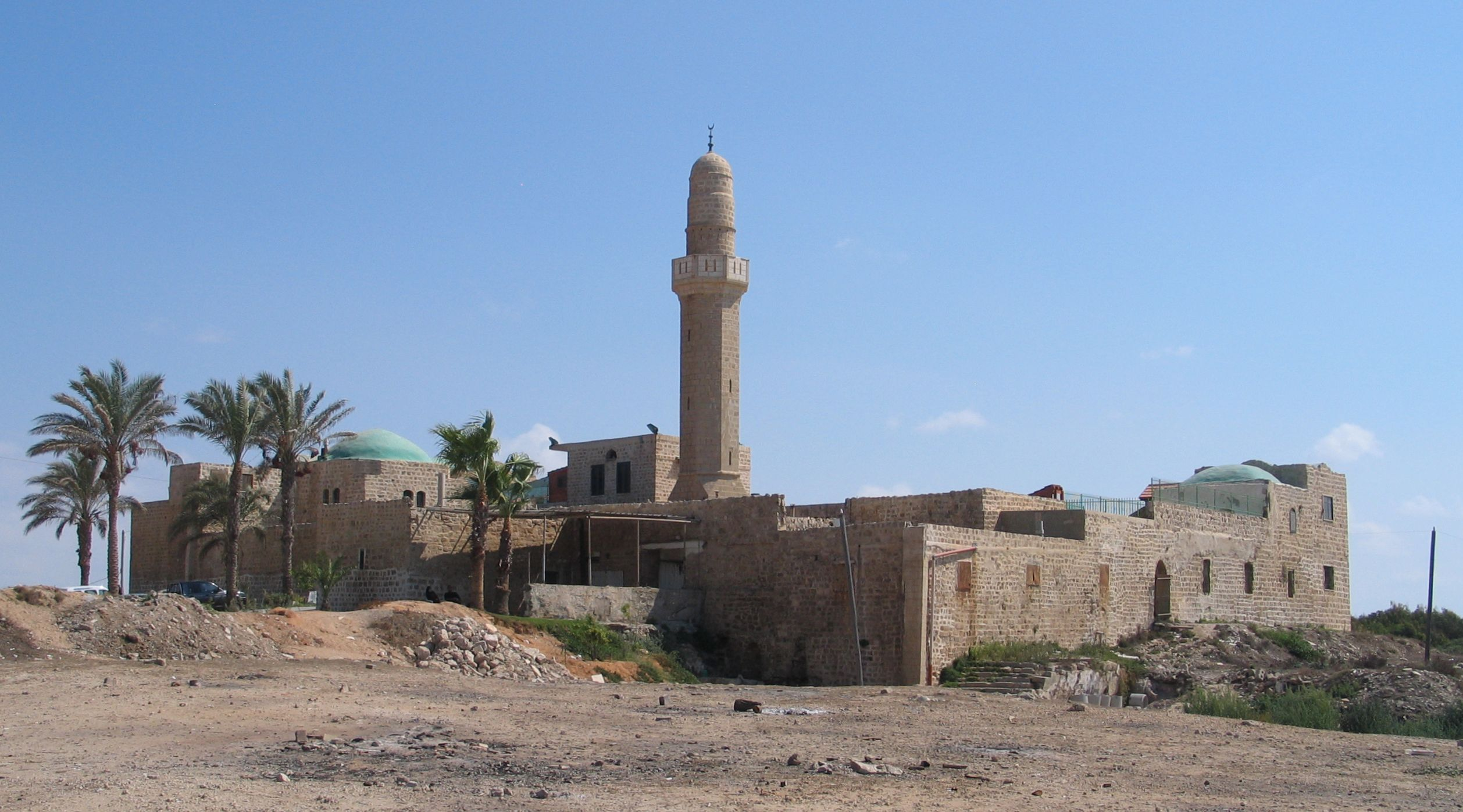
- Sidna Ali Mosque in Al-Haram

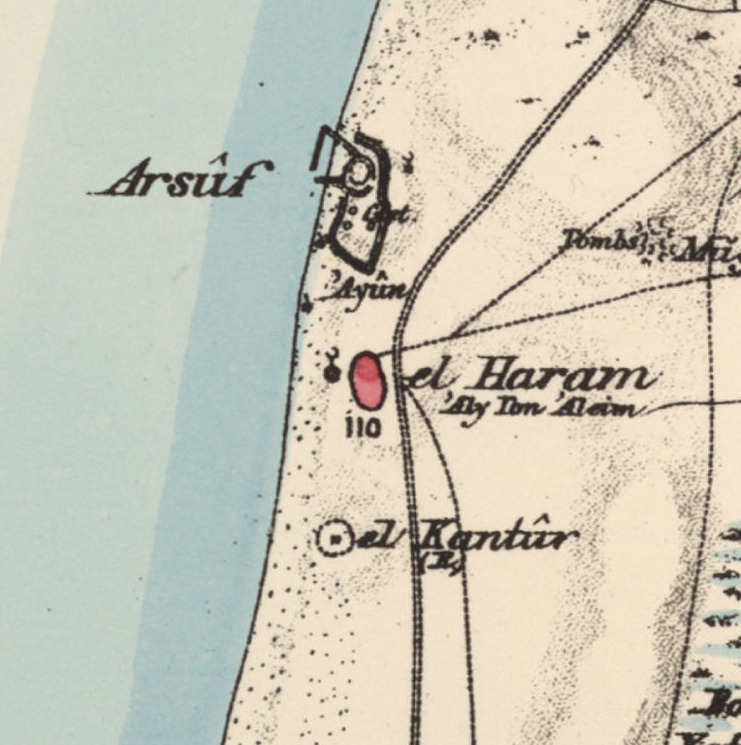
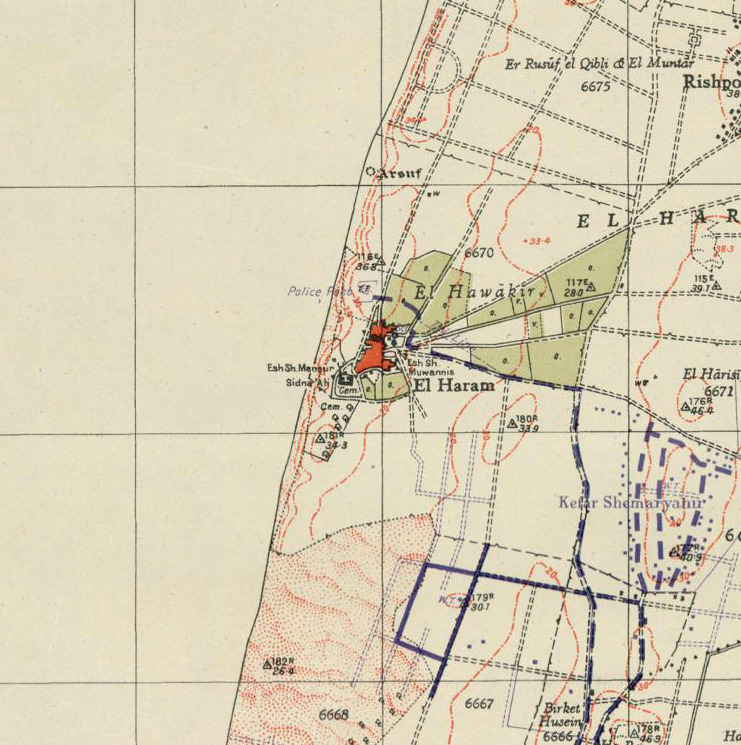
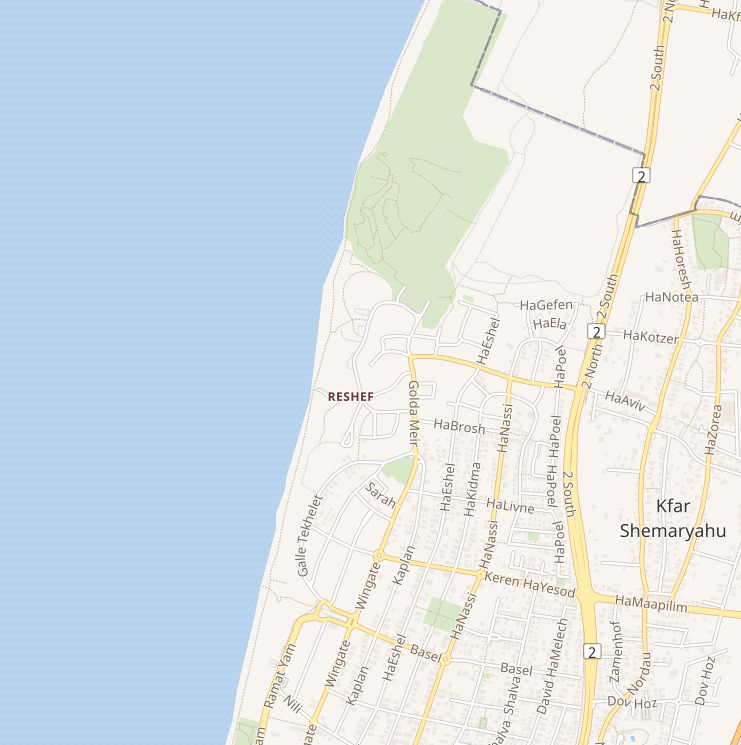
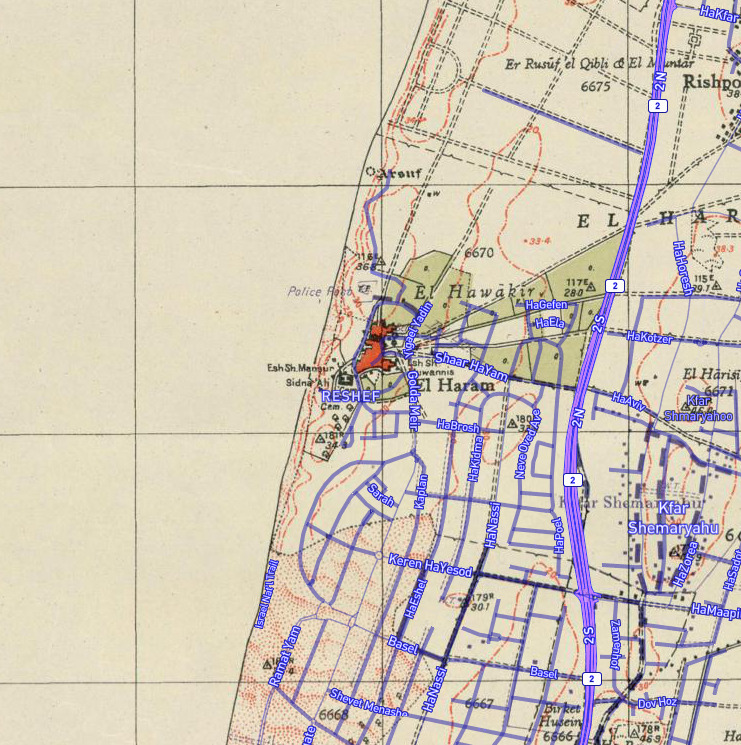
- 1870s map 1940s map modern map 1940s with modern overlay map A series of historical maps of the area around Al-Haram, Jaffa (click the buttons)

- Location within Mandatory Palestine
- Coordinates: 32°11′17″N 34°48′24″E
- Palestine grid: 131/177
- Geopolitical entity: Mandatory Palestine
- Subdistrict: Jaffa
- Date of depopulation: 3 February 1948

Area
  - Total: 2,681 dunams (2.681 km^{2}; 1.035 sq mi)

Population (1945)
  - Total: 520
- Cause(s) of depopulation: Fear of being caught up in the fighting

Al-Haram (El Haram ʿAly Ibn ʿAleim, also Sayyiduna Ali or Sidna Ali "sanctuary of ʿAli [Ibn ʿAleim]", Hebrew: אל-חרם, Arabic: الحرم), was a Palestinian Arab village in the Jaffa Subdistrict, in Mandatory Palestine. It was located 16 km (10 miles) north of Jaffa, adjacent to the ruins of the medieval walled city of Arsuf, and its extent was estimated to range between 9,653 and 11,698 dunams of which 5,150 were accounted for in the cadastral registrations. It was depopulated during the 1948 war.

== History ==
=== Medieval ===
The medieval walled city of Arsuf was captured from the Kingdom of Jerusalem by Baibars in 1265, after 40 days of siege. Its inhabitants were killed or sold as slaves and the town completely razed. The site was fully abandoned for about a century; according to the geographer Abulfeda (writing in c. 1330), the site contained no inhabitants ("Tabula Syriæ", 82). It appears that a minor village was re-established in the 16th century in the vicinity of the Sidna Ali Mosque. The mosque is mentioned by Mujir al-Din (writing c. 1496) as having been dedicated at the tomb of a Muslim saint, ʿAli Ibn ʿAleim (d. 1081), and that Sultan Baybars had prayed at the tomb for victory prior to retaking Arsuf in 1265.

=== Ottoman period ===
Al-Haram was one of four villages founded during the Ottoman period, near the coast north of the Yarkon River (along with the villages of Al-Shaykh Muwannis, Ijlil, and Umm Khalid). According to historian Roy Marom, the site remained inhabited due to the religious and commercial importance of Maqam Sayyiduna 'Ali ibn al-'Ulaym as a pilgrimage site commanding vast endowed estates. Historiographically, the establishment of Al-Haram "demonstrates that the expansion of settlement in the southern Sharon was the result of the internal expansion of the core settlement by residents of the mountainous highlands of Samaria, and not by Egyptian ‘penetrators’ as previously claimed."

In 1596, in the Ottoman era, a third of the revenues from a place called "Arsuf" went to the waqf of ʿAli Ibn ʿAleim. Pierre Jacotin called the village Ali Ebn harami on his map from 1799.

In 1870/1871 (1288 AH), an Ottoman census listed the village in the nahiya (sub-district) of Bani Sa'b.

In 1880, it was described in the PEF's Survey of Western Palestine as an adobe village of moderate size on high ground, with springs to the north, and on the west a mosque. The full name was recorded as El Haram 'Aly Ibn 'Aleim.

=== British Mandate ===
In the 1922 census of Palestine conducted by the British Mandate authorities, Al-Haran had a population of 172, all Muslims increasing the 1931 census to 313, still all Muslims, in a total of 83 houses.

During the 1920s, the Palestine Land Development Company (PLDC) bought part of the village land on behalf of the American Zion Commonwealth from the Omri family of Beirut, to found the settlement of Herzliya. Later purchases of village land by the PLDC, Jewish National Fund, Keren Hayesod and private Jewish buyers was used to establish Kfar Shmaryahu and Rishpon. At the time, during the Palestinian revolt against the British Mandate, two al-Haram villagers were brought before the rebel leader Aref Abd al-Razeq, and condemned for having sold land there to the Jews, as documents are showing. According to some testimonies, the relationship between the villagers of Al-Haram and the Jews of Herzliya and Rishpon was friendly. The early settlers of Herzliya mention Arab peddlers in the streets of the town. Some of the villagers were employed in construction. Former Arab residents of al-Haram testified that before the war, representatives of the Jewish towns assured them they were safe.

In the 1945 statistics the village had a population of 880, with 360 Jewish inhabitants. Al-Haram had an elementary school for boys founded in 1921, and in 1945 it had an enrollment of 68 students. The village also contained a mosque and the shrine of al-Hasan ibn 'Ali (d. AD 1081), a descendant of the second Muslim caliph, 'Umar ibn al-Khattab.

According to Morris, the villagers were evacuated on 3 February 1948 out of fear of Jewish attack, after Haganah or Irgun attacks on nearby villages.

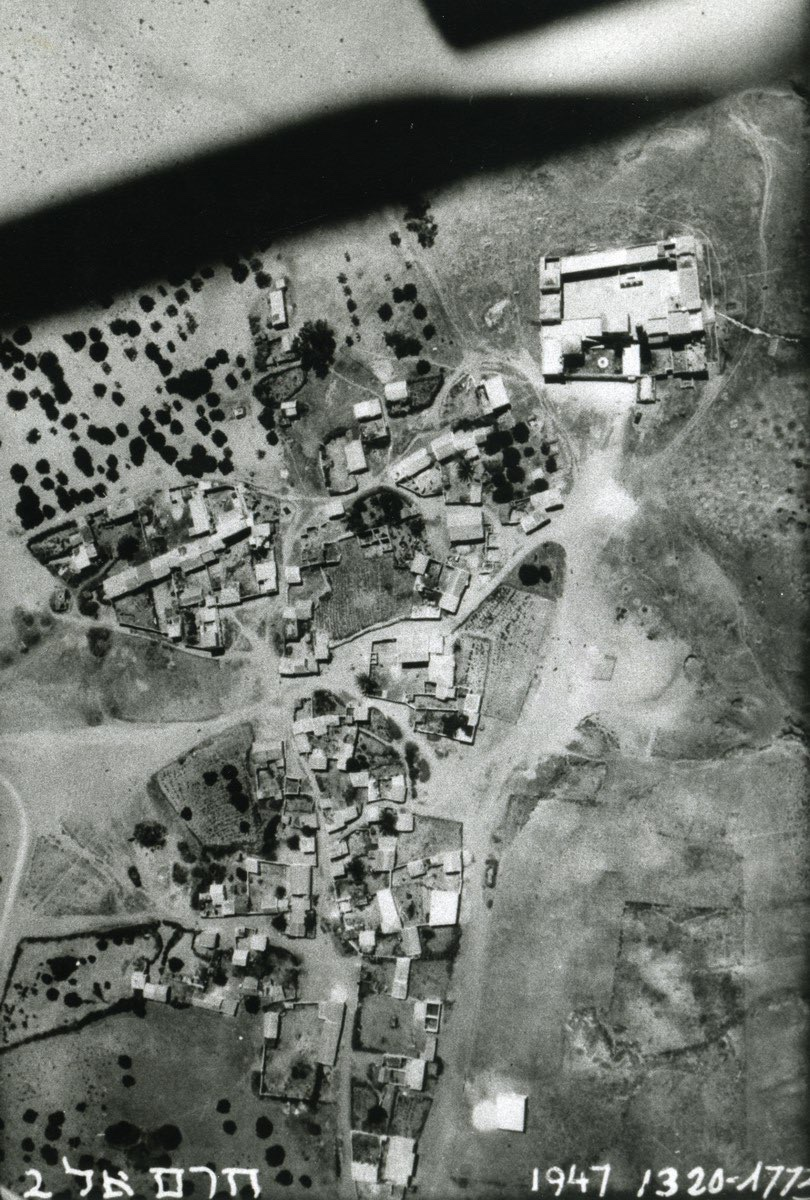
al-Haram, Jaffa, 1947 from Palmach archive

=== Today ===
The only trace of the former village is the Sidna Ali shrine and the cemetery which surrounds it. The cemetery is used as a parking lot by tourists. Many Muslim graves are mentioned in a 1998 archaeological publication to the west and south of the structure.

The shrine is located between the Sidna Ali Beach aka Nof Yam, and the Reshef neighbourhood of Herzliya.

== Bibliography ==
- Avneri, Arieh L. (1982). The Claim of Dispossession: Jewish Land-settlement and the Arabs, 1878-1948. Transaction Publishers. ISBN 0-87855-964-7.
- Barron, J.B., ed. (1923). Palestine: Report and General Abstracts of the Census of 1922. Government of Palestine.
- Canaan, T. (1927). Mohammedan Saints and Sanctuaries in Palestine. London: Luzac & Co. Archived from the original on 2019-05-16. (p.215 Archived 2020-07-17 at the Wayback Machine; cited in Petersen, 2001)
- Conder, C.R.; Kitchener, H.H. (1882). The Survey of Western Palestine: Memoirs of the Topography, Orography, Hydrography, and Archaeology. Vol. 2. London: Committee of the Palestine Exploration Fund.
- Essaid, Aida (2014). Zionism and Land Tenure in Mandate Palestine. Routledge. pp. 175–213. ISBN 9781134653614.
- Glass, Joseph B. (2002). From new Zion to old Zion: American Jewish immigration and settlement in Palestine, 1917 - 1939. Wayne State University Press. ISBN 0814328423.
- Government of Palestine, Department of Statistics (1945). Village Statistics, April, 1945.
- Hadawi, S. (1970). Village Statistics of 1945: A Classification of Land and Area ownership in Palestine. Palestine Liberation Organization Research Center. Archived from the original on 2018-12-08.
- Hütteroth, W.-D.; Abdulfattah, K. (1977). Historical Geography of Palestine, Transjordan and Southern Syria in the Late 16th Century. Erlanger Geographische Arbeiten, Sonderband 5. Erlangen, Germany: Vorstand der Fränkischen Geographischen Gesellschaft. ISBN 3-920405-41-2.
- Karmon, Y. (1960). "An Analysis of Jacotin's Map of Palestine" (PDF). Israel Exploration Journal. 10 (3, 4): 155–173, 244–253. Archived from the original (PDF) on 2019-12-22.
- Khalidi, W. (1992). All That Remains: The Palestinian Villages Occupied and Depopulated by Israel in 1948. Washington D.C.: Institute for Palestine Studies. ISBN 0-88728-224-5.
- Mills, E., ed. (1932). Census of Palestine 1931. Population of Villages, Towns and Administrative Areas. Jerusalem: Government of Palestine.
- Morris, B. (2004). The Birth of the Palestinian Refugee Problem Revisited. Cambridge University Press. ISBN 978-0-521-00967-6.
- Palmer, E.H. (1881). The Survey of Western Palestine: Arabic and English Name Lists Collected During the Survey by Lieutenants Conder and Kitchener, R. E. Transliterated and Explained by E.H. Palmer. Committee of the Palestine Exploration Fund.
- Petersen, Andrew (2001). A Gazetteer of Buildings in Muslim Palestine (British Academy Monographs in Archaeology). Vol. 1. Oxford University Press. ISBN 978-0-19-727011-0. Archived from the original on 2021-05-29. (Al-Haram: pp.146-148 Archived 2019-08-10 at the Wayback Machine)
