= Glil Yam =

Kibbutz in central Israel

Glil Yam: גְּלִיל יָם (Hebrew)
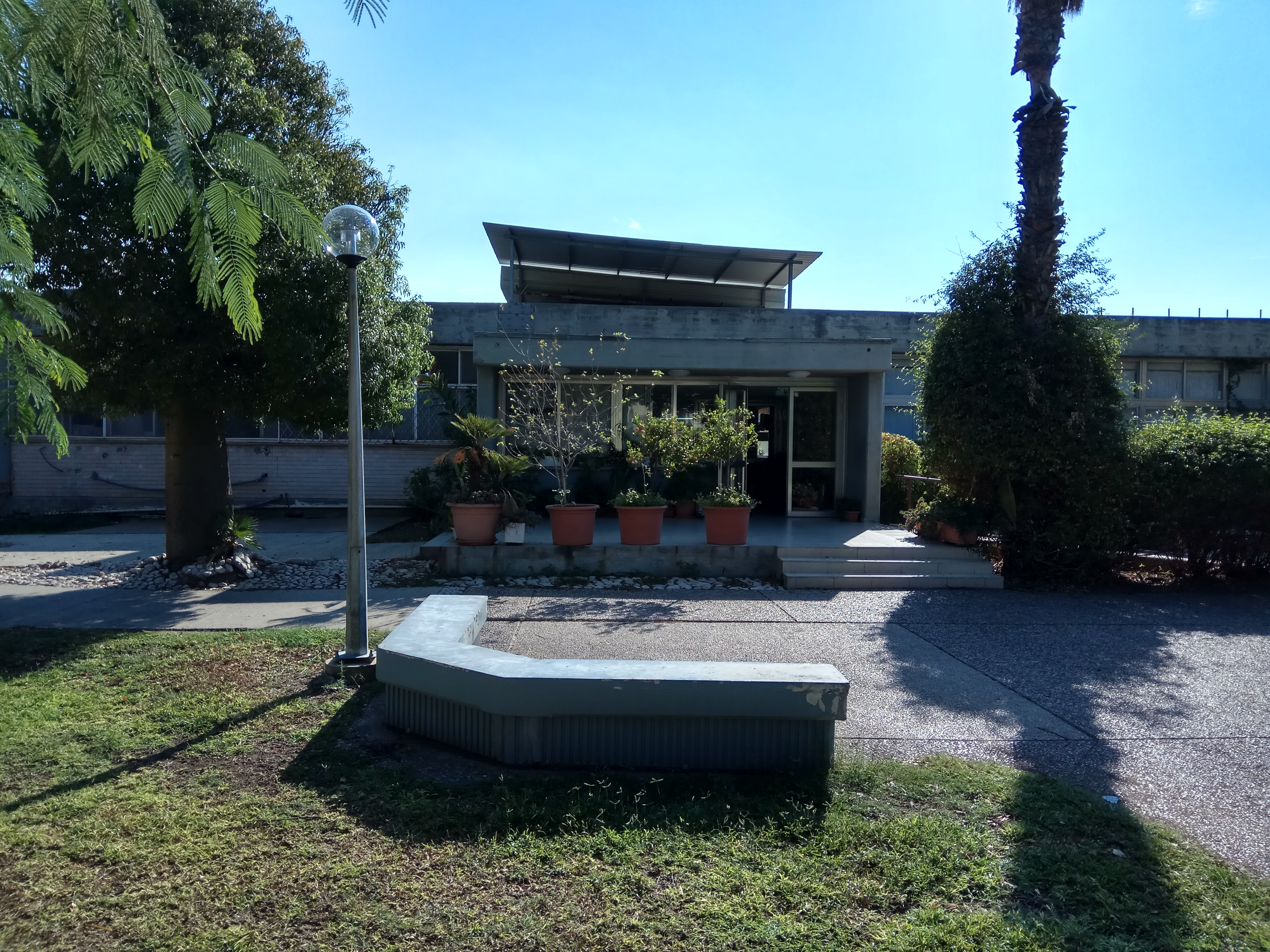

- Location within Central Israel
- Coordinates: 32°9′24″N 34°49′51″E
- Country: Israel
- District: Tel Aviv
- Council: Hof HaSharon
- Affiliation: Kibbutz Movement
- Founded: 1943
- Founder: Soviet Jews
- Population (2024): 642
- Website: www.glil-yam.org.il

Glil Yam (Hebrew: גְּלִיל יָם) is a kibbutz in central Israel. Located in the Sharon plain between Ramat HaSharon and Herzliya, it falls under the jurisdiction of Hof HaSharon Regional Council. In 2024 it had a population of 642.

== History ==
The kibbutz was established in 1943 by a group which had formed in 1933. The land on which the village was founded had been bought from the Arab village of Ijlil by the Jewish National Fund. Its name is mentioned in the book of Samaritans, which was also preserved in the name of the Arab village.

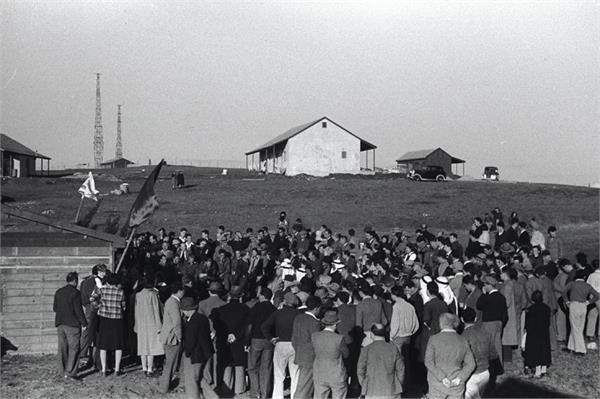
Glil Yam founding ceremony 1943
