= Al-Mas'udiyya =

Al-Mas'udiyya المسعوديّة/صميل Summayl
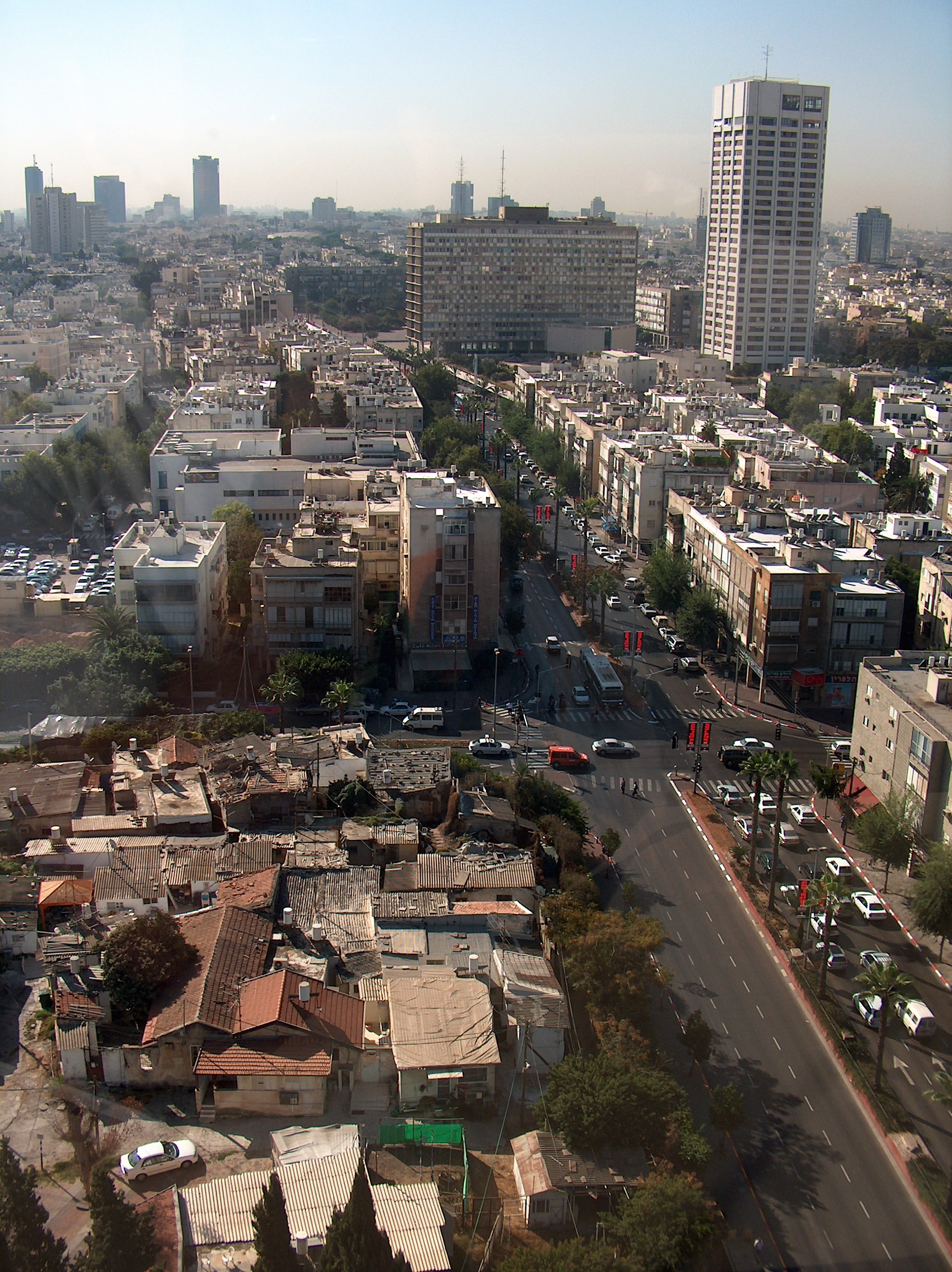
- Remains of Al-Mas'udiyya, in 2005.
- Etymology: Summeil, personal name, from "hard", or "withered"
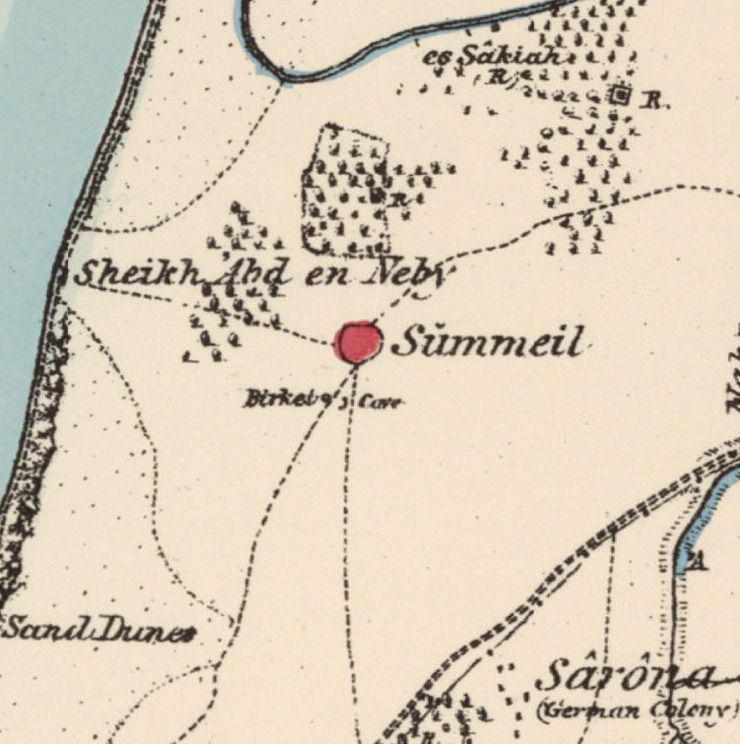
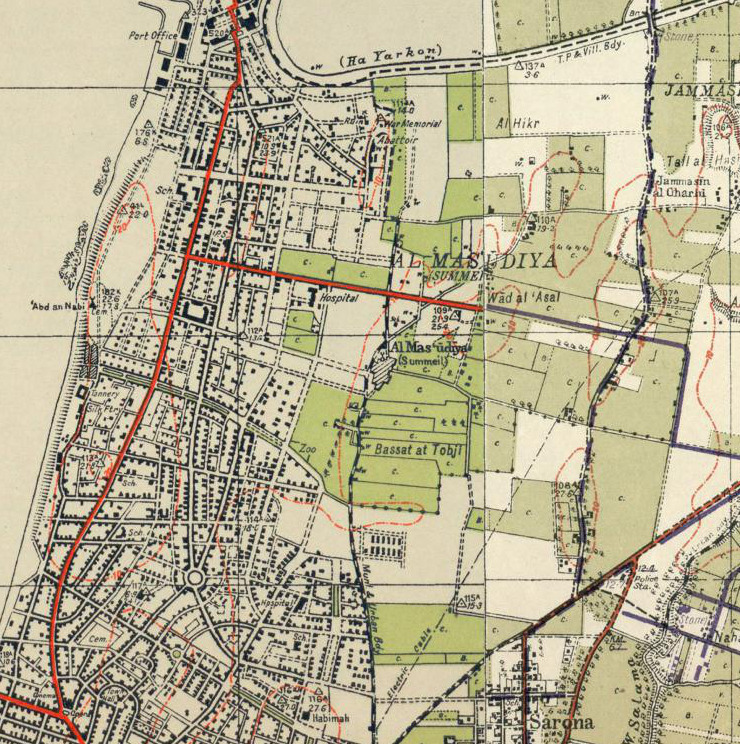
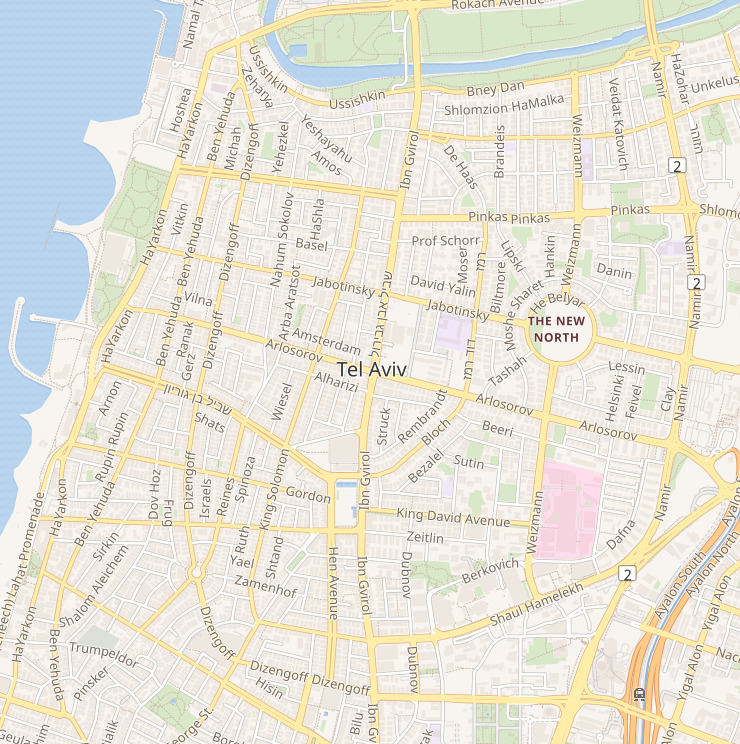
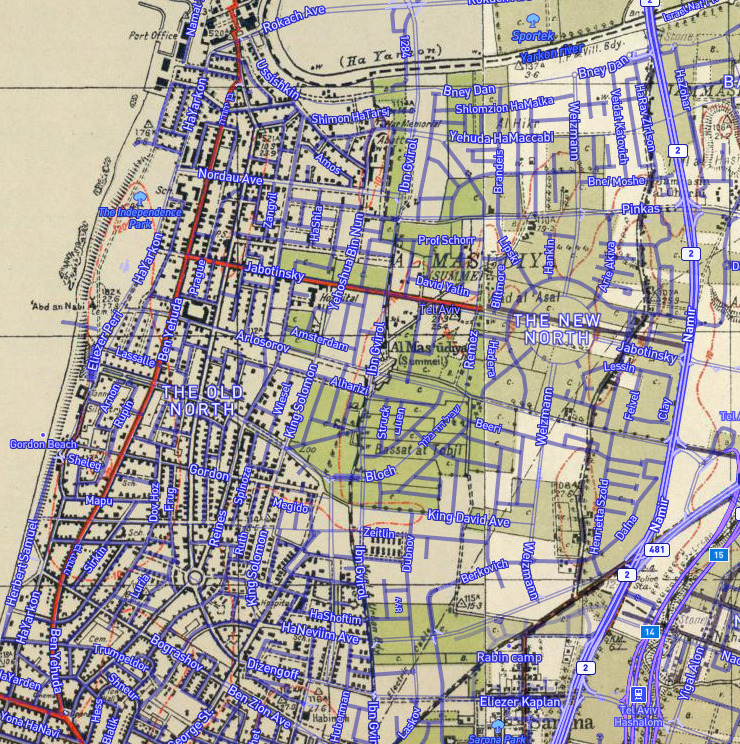
- 1870s map 1940s map modern map 1940s with modern overlay map A series of historical maps of the area around Al-Mas'udiyya (click the buttons)

- Location within Mandatory Palestine
- Coordinates: 32°05′07″N 34°46′54″E
- Palestine grid: 129/165
- Geopolitical entity: Mandatory Palestine
- Subdistrict: Jaffa
- Date of depopulation: December 25, 1947

Population (1945)
  - Total: 850
- Cause(s) of depopulation: Fear of being caught up in the fighting
- Current Localities: part of Tel Aviv

Al-Mas'udiyya (also known as Summayl), was a Palestinian Arab village in the Jaffa Subdistrict. It was depopulated during the 1947–1948 Civil War in Mandatory Palestine on December 25, 1947. It was located 5 km northeast of Jaffa, situated 1.5 km south of the al-'Awja River. The village used to be known as Summayl.

== History ==
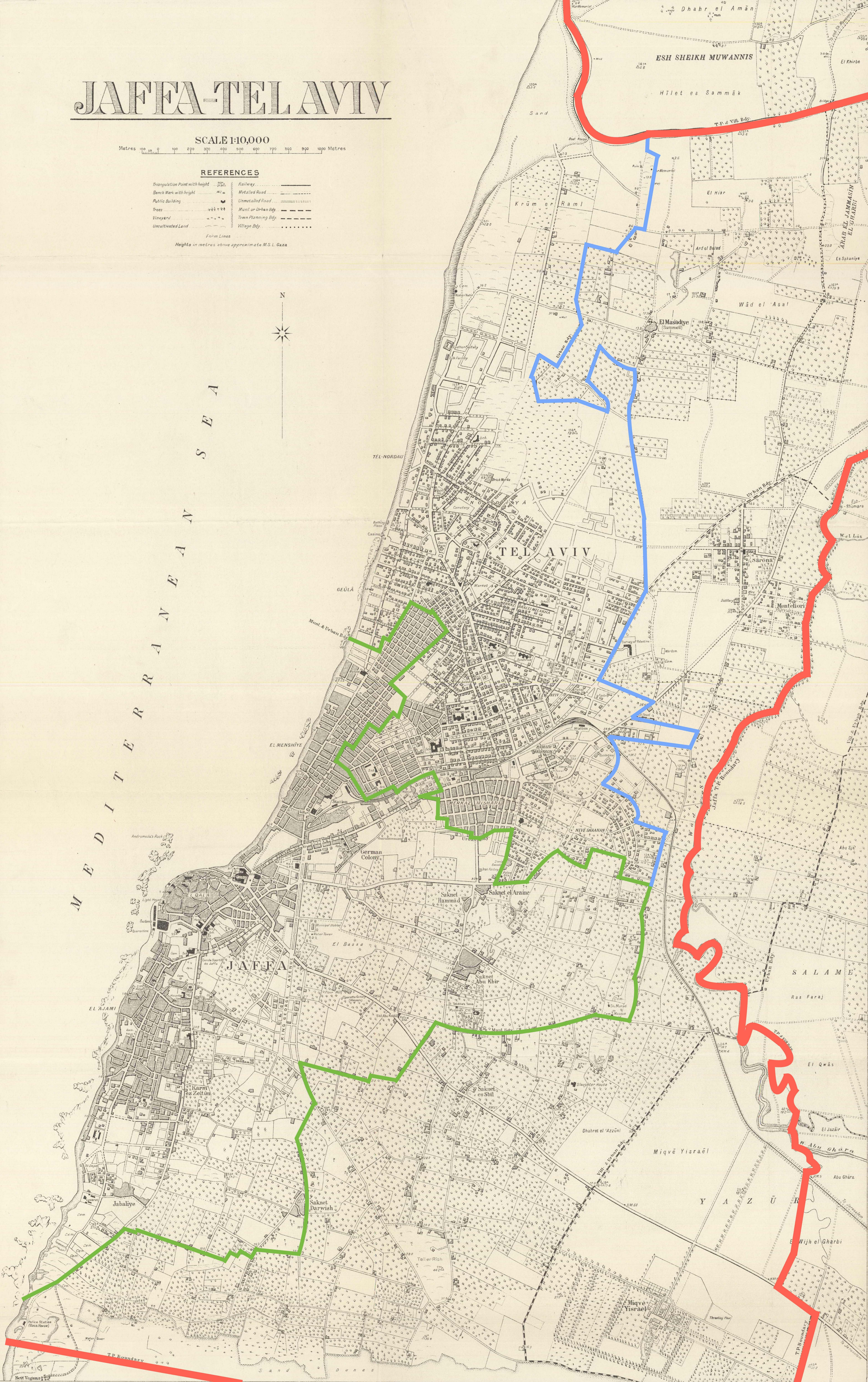
The village shown within the Jaffa municipality (thick red line) on a 1930 Survey of Palestine map; click image to view full map

In 1799, it was noted as an unnamed village on the map that Pierre Jacotin compiled that year.

An Ottoman village list from about 1870 showed that Samwil had 23 houses and a population of 62, though the population count included men, only. It was noted as a Bedouin camp, 4,5 km north of Jaffa centre, and 1 km from the sea.

In 1882, the PEF's Survey of Western Palestine (SWP) described Summeil as an ordinary adobe village, which had a large well, and a cave.

Excavations revealed traces of Late Ottoman infant jar-burials, commonly associated with nomads or itinerant workers of Egyptian origins.

=== British Mandate era ===
In the 1922 census of Palestine, conducted by the British Mandate authorities, Mas'udiyeh had a population of 443; 437 Muslims and 6 Christians, (where the Christians all belonged to the Templar community), increasing in the 1931 census to 658; 654 Muslim and 4 Christians, in a total of 127 houses.

On 20 December 1942, Al-Mas'udiyya was annexed into Tel Aviv as part of a municipal border expansion.

In the 1945 statistics, the village had a population of 850; 830 Muslims and 20 Christians.

Al-Mas'udiyya had an elementary school founded in 1931, and in 1945 it had 31 students.

=== 1948, aftermath ===
In 1992, the village site was described: "The area is part of Tel Aviv. All that remains of the village is one deserted house that belonged to Muhammad Baydas. Cactuses, castor-oil (ricinus) plants, and palm and cypress trees further mark the site. Nearby is the al-Mas'udiyya (or Summayl) bridge – an arched, steel structure."

== Bibliography ==
- Barron, J.B., ed. (1923). Palestine: Report and General Abstracts of the Census of 1922. Government of Palestine.
- Conder, C.R.; Kitchener, H.H. (1882). The Survey of Western Palestine: Memoirs of the Topography, Orography, Hydrography, and Archaeology. Vol. 2. London: Committee of the Palestine Exploration Fund.
- Department of Statistics (1945). Village Statistics, April, 1945. Government of Palestine.
- Hadawi, S. (1970). Village Statistics of 1945: A Classification of Land and Area ownership in Palestine. Palestine Liberation Organization Research Centre. Archived from the original on 2018-12-08.
- Hartmann, M. (1883). "Die Ortschaftenliste des Liwa Jerusalem in dem türkischen Staatskalender für Syrien auf das Jahr 1288 der Flucht (1871)". Zeitschrift des Deutschen Palästina-Vereins. 6: 102–149.
- Karmon, Y. (1960). "An Analysis of Jacotin's Map of Palestine" (PDF). Israel Exploration Journal. 10 (3, 4): 155–173, 244–253. Archived from the original (PDF) on 2017-12-01.
- Khalidi, W. (1992). All That Remains: The Palestinian Villages Occupied and Depopulated by Israel in 1948. Washington D.C.: Institute for Palestine Studies. ISBN 0-88728-224-5.
- Mills, E., ed. (1932). Census of Palestine 1931. Population of Villages, Towns and Administrative Areas. Jerusalem: Government of Palestine.
- Morris, B. (2004). The Birth of the Palestinian Refugee Problem Revisited. Cambridge University Press. ISBN 978-0-521-00967-6. (pp. 91, 126, 128, 384)
- Palmer, E.H. (1881). The Survey of Western Palestine: Arabic and English Name Lists Collected During the Survey by Lieutenants Conder and Kitchener, R. E. Transliterated and Explained by E.H. Palmer. Committee of the Palestine Exploration Fund.
