= Lod =

Lod: לוד; اللِّدّ
- City
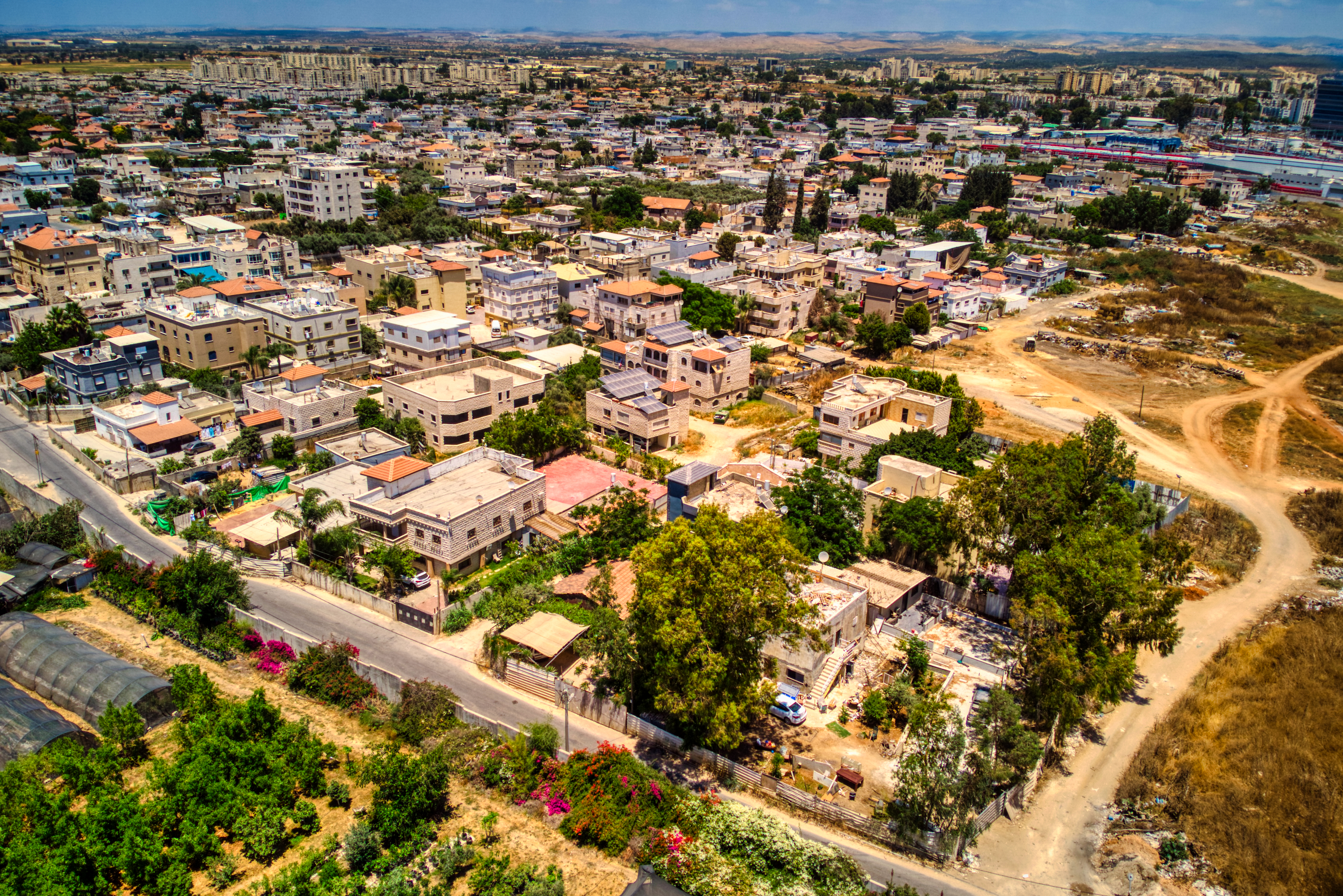

- Location within Israel
- Coordinates: 31°57′7″N 34°53′17″E
- Country: Israel
- District: Central
- Subdistrict: Ramla
- Natural Region: Ramla
- Founded: 5600–5250 BCE (Initial settlement); 1465 BCE (Canaanite/Israelite town)

Government
  - Mayor: Yair Revivo

Area
  - Total: 12,226 dunams (12.226 km^{2}; 4.720 sq mi)

Population (2024)
  - Total: 94,189
  - Density: 7,704.0/km^{2} (19,953/sq mi)

Lod (Hebrew: לוד, fully vocalized: לֹד), also known as Lydda (Ancient Greek: Λύδδα) and Lidd (Arabic: اللِّدّ, romanized: al-Lidd, or اللُّدّ, al-Ludd), is a city 15 km (9 1/2 mi) southeast of Tel Aviv and 40 km (25 mi) northwest of Jerusalem in the Central District of Israel. It is situated between the lower Shephelah on the east and the coastal plain on the west. The city had a population of 94,189 in 2024.

Lod has been inhabited since at least the Neolithic period. It is mentioned a few times in the Hebrew Bible and in the New Testament. Between the 5th century BCE and up until the late Roman period, it was a prominent center for Jewish scholarship and trade. Around 200 CE, the city became a Roman colony and was renamed Diospolis (Ancient Greek: Διόσπολις, lit. 'city of Zeus'). Tradition identifies Lod as the 4th century martyrdom site of Saint George; the Church of Saint George and Mosque of Al-Khadr located in the city is believed to have housed his remains.

Following the Arab conquest of the Levant, Lod served as the capital of Jund Filastin; however, a few decades later, the seat of power was transferred to Ramla, and Lod slipped in importance. Under Crusader rule, the city was a Catholic diocese of the Latin Church and it remains a titular see to this day.

Lod underwent a major change in its population in the mid-20th century. Exclusively Palestinian Arab in 1947, Lod was part of the area designated for an Arab state in the United Nations Partition Plan for Palestine; however, in July 1948, the city was occupied by the Israel Defense Forces, and most of its Arab inhabitants were expelled in the Palestinian expulsion from Lydda and Ramle. The city was largely resettled by Jewish immigrants, most of them from Arab countries.

Today, Lod is one of Israel's mixed cities, with an Arab population of 30%. Lod is one of Israel's major transportation hubs. The main international airport, Ben Gurion Airport, is located 8 km (5 miles) north of the city. The city is also a major railway and road junction.

== Religious references ==
The Hebrew name Lod appears in the Hebrew Bible as a town of Benjamin, founded along with Ono by Shemed (1 Chronicles 8:12; Ezra 2:33; Nehemiah 7:37; 11:35). In Ezra 2:33, it is mentioned as one of the cities whose inhabitants returned after the Babylonian captivity. Lod is not mentioned among the towns allocated to the tribe of Benjamin in Joshua 18:11–28.

The name Lod derives from a tri-consonantal root not extant in Northwest Semitic, but only in Arabic (“to quarrel; withhold, hinder”). An Arabic etymology of such an ancient name is unlikely (the earliest attestation is from the Achaemenid period).

In the New Testament, the town appears in its Greek form, Lydda, as the site of Peter's healing of Aeneas in Acts 9:32–38.

The city is also mentioned in an Islamic hadith as the location of the battlefield where the false messiah (al-Masih ad-Dajjal) will be slain before the Day of Judgment.

== History ==
=== Neolithic and Chalcolithic ===
The first occupation dates to the Neolithic in the Near East and is associated with the Lodian culture. Occupation continued in the Levant Chalcolithic. Pottery finds have dated the initial settlement in the area now occupied by the town to 5600–5250 BCE.

=== Early Bronze ===
In the Early Bronze, it was an important settlement in the central coastal plain between the Judean Shephelah and the Mediterranean coast, along Nahal Ayalon. Other important nearby sites were Tel Dalit, Tel Bareqet, Khirbat Abu Hamid (Shoham North), Tel Afeq, Azor and Jaffa.

Two architectural phases belong to the late EB I in Area B. The first phase had a mudbrick wall, while the late phase included a circulat stone structure. Later excavations have produced an occupation later, Stratum IV. It consists of two phases, Stratum IVb with mudbrick wall on stone foundations and rounded exterior corners. In Stratum IVa there was a mudbrick wall with no stone foundations, with imported Egyptian potter and local pottery imitations.

Another excavations revealed nine occupation strata. Strata VI-III belonged to Early Bronze IB. The material culture showed Egyptian imports in strata V and IV.

Occupation continued into Early Bronze II with four strata (V-II). There was continuity in the material culture and indications of centralized urban planning.

=== Middle Bronze ===
North to the tell were scattered MB II burials.

=== Late Bronze ===
The earliest written record is in a list of Canaanite towns drawn up by the Egyptian pharaoh Thutmose III at Karnak in 1465 BCE.

=== Classical era ===
From the fifth century BCE until the Roman period, the city was a centre of Jewish scholarship and commerce.

According to British historian Martin Gilbert, during the Hasmonean period, Jonathan Maccabee and his brother, Simon Maccabaeus, enlarged the area under Jewish control, which included conquering the city.

=== Roman era ===
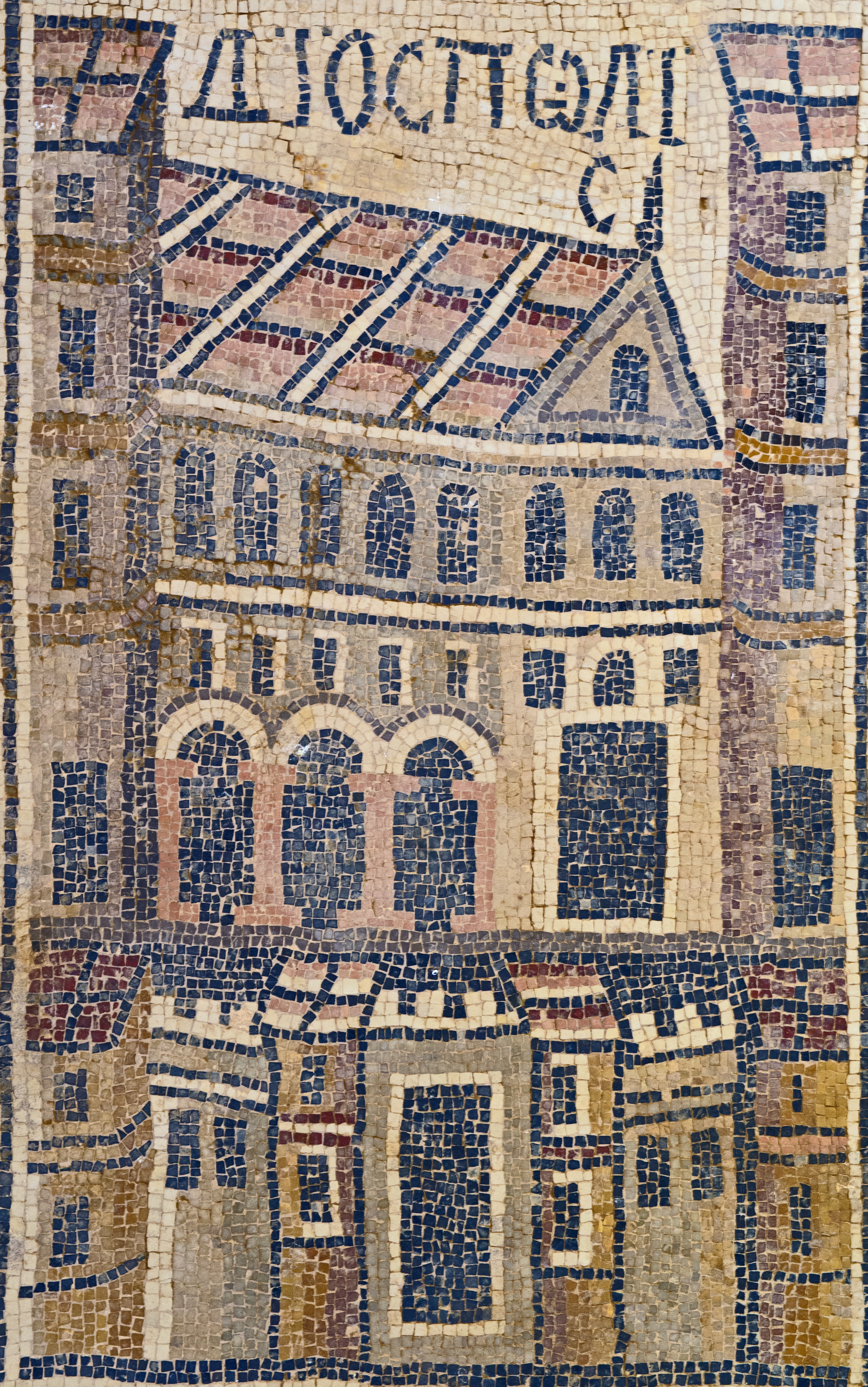
Depiction of Lydda in the Umm ar-Rasas mosaics, 8th century CE

The Jewish community in Lod during the Mishnah and Talmud era is described in a significant number of sources, including information on its institutions, demographics, and way of life. The city reached its height as a Jewish center between the First Jewish-Roman War and the Bar Kokhba revolt, and again in the days of Judah ha-Nasi and the start of the Amoraim period. The city was then the site of numerous public institutions, including schools, study houses, and synagogues.

In 43 BC, Cassius, the Roman governor of Syria, sold the inhabitants of Lod into slavery, but they were set free two years later by Mark Antony.

During the First Jewish–Roman War, the Roman proconsul of Syria, Cestius Gallus, razed the town on his way to Jerusalem in Tishrei 66 CE. According to Josephus, "[he] found the city deserted, for the entire population had gone up to Jerusalem for the Feast of Tabernacles. He killed fifty people whom he found, burned the town and marched on". Lydda was occupied by Emperor Vespasian in 68 CE.

In the period following the destruction of Jerusalem in 70 CE, Rabbi Tarfon, who appears in many Tannaitic and Jewish legal discussions, served as a rabbinic authority in Lod.

During the Kitos War, 115–117 CE, the Roman army laid siege to Lod, where the rebel Jews had gathered under the leadership of Julian and Pappos. Torah study was outlawed by the Romans and pursued mostly in the underground. The distress became so great, the patriarch Rabban Gamaliel II, who was shut up there and died soon afterwards, permitted fasting on Ḥanukkah. Other rabbis disagreed with this ruling. Lydda was next taken and many of the Jews were executed; the "slain of Lydda" are often mentioned in words of reverential praise in the Talmud.

In 200 CE, emperor Septimius Severus elevated the town to the status of a city, calling it Colonia Lucia Septimia Severa Diospolis. The name Diospolis ("City of Zeus") may have been bestowed earlier, possibly by Hadrian. At that point, most of its inhabitants were Christian. The earliest known bishop is Aëtius, a friend of Arius.

During the following century (200-300CE), it's said that Joshua ben Levi founded a yeshiva in Lod.

=== Byzantine period ===
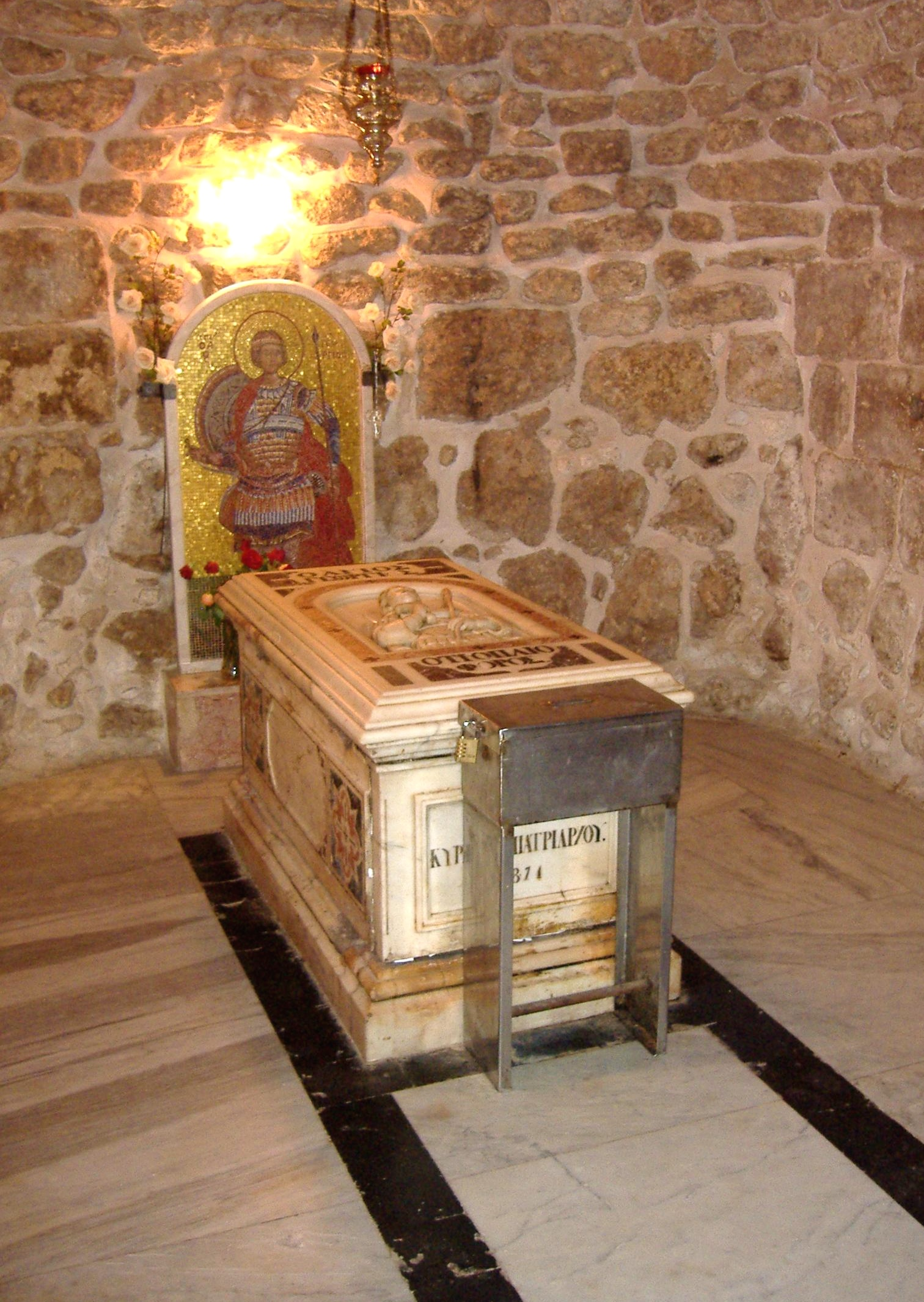
Tomb of Saint George, first mentioned about 530 by the pilgrim Theodosius

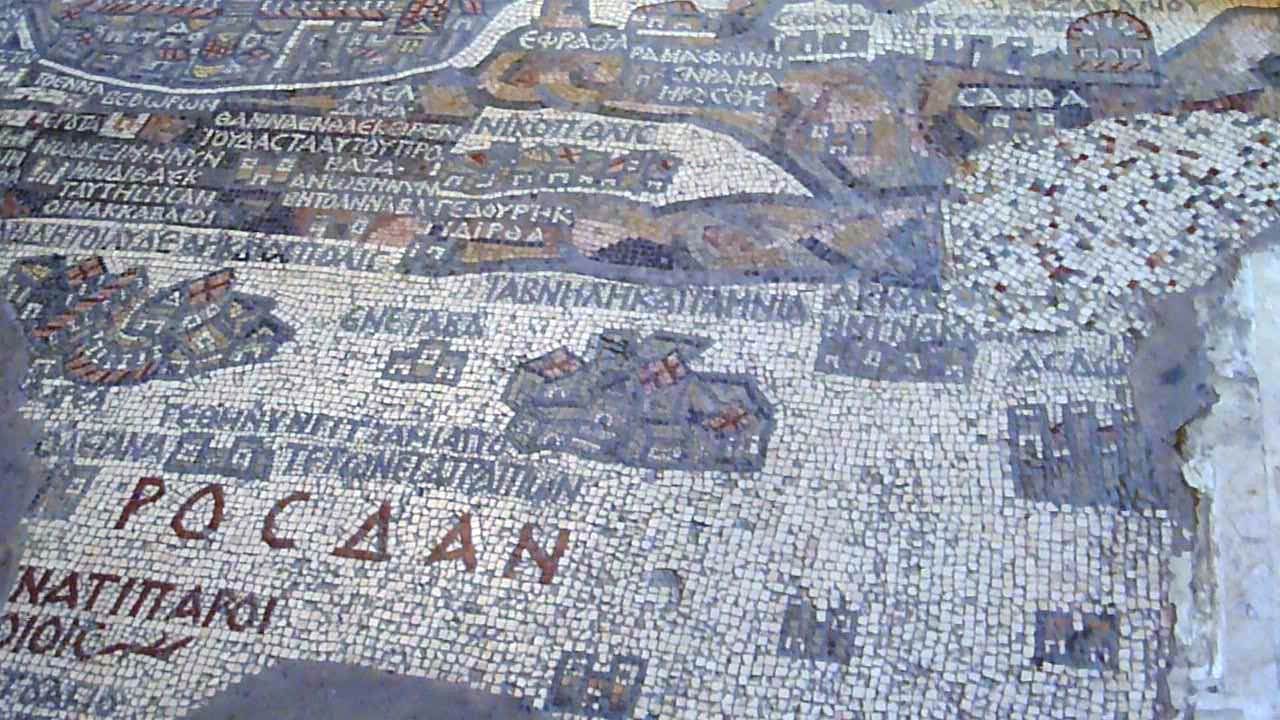
Madaba Map, 6th century CE, showing Lod above and left (NW) of the red "[ΚΛΗ]ΡΟϹ ΔΑΝ" ("the lot of Dan") inscription (left margin, touching on damaged area)

In December 415, the Council of Diospolis was held here to try Pelagius; he was acquitted. In the sixth century, the city was renamed Georgiopolis after St. George, a soldier in the guard of the emperor Diocletian, who was born there between 256 and 285 CE.

The Church of Saint George and Mosque of Al-Khadr is named for him. The 6th-century Madaba map shows Lydda as an unwalled city with a cluster of buildings under a black inscription reading "Lod, also Lydea, also Diospolis". An isolated large building with a semicircular colonnaded plaza in front of it might represent the St George shrine.

=== Early Muslim period ===
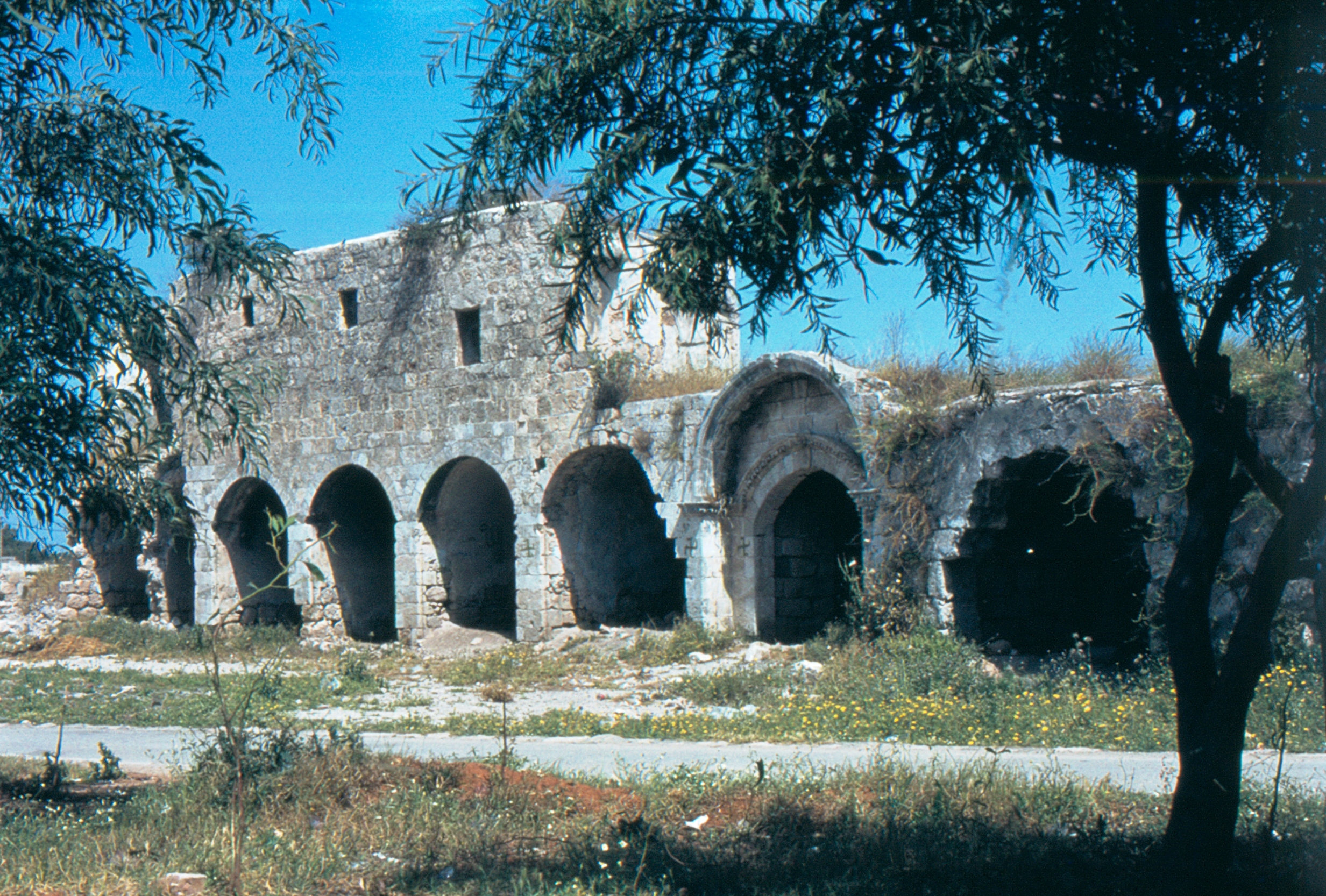
Khan el-Hilu, Lod

After the Muslim conquest of Palestine by Amr ibn al-'As in 636 CE, Lod which was referred to as "al-Ludd" in Arabic served as the capital of Jund Filastin ("Military District of Palaestina") before the seat of power was moved to nearby Ramla during the reign of the Umayyad Caliph Suleiman ibn Abd al-Malik in 715–716. The population of al-Ludd was relocated to Ramla, as well. With the relocation of its inhabitants and the construction of the White Mosque in Ramla, al-Ludd lost its importance and fell into decay.

The city was visited by the local Arab geographer al-Muqaddasi in 985, when it was under the Fatimid Caliphate, and was noted for its Great Mosque which served the residents of al-Ludd, Ramla, and the nearby villages. He also wrote of the city's "wonderful church (of St. George) at the gate of which Christ will slay the Antichrist."

=== Crusader and Ayyubid period ===
The Crusaders occupied the city in 1099 and named it St Jorge de Lidde. It was briefly conquered by Saladin, but retaken by the Crusaders in 1191. For the English Crusaders, it was a place of great significance as the birthplace of Saint George. The Crusaders made it the seat of a Latin Church diocese, and it remains a titular see. It owed the service of 10 knights and 20 sergeants, and it had its own burgess court during this era.

In 1226, Ayyubid Syrian geographer Yaqut al-Hamawi visited al-Ludd and stated it was part of the Jerusalem District during Ayyubid rule.

=== Mamluk period ===
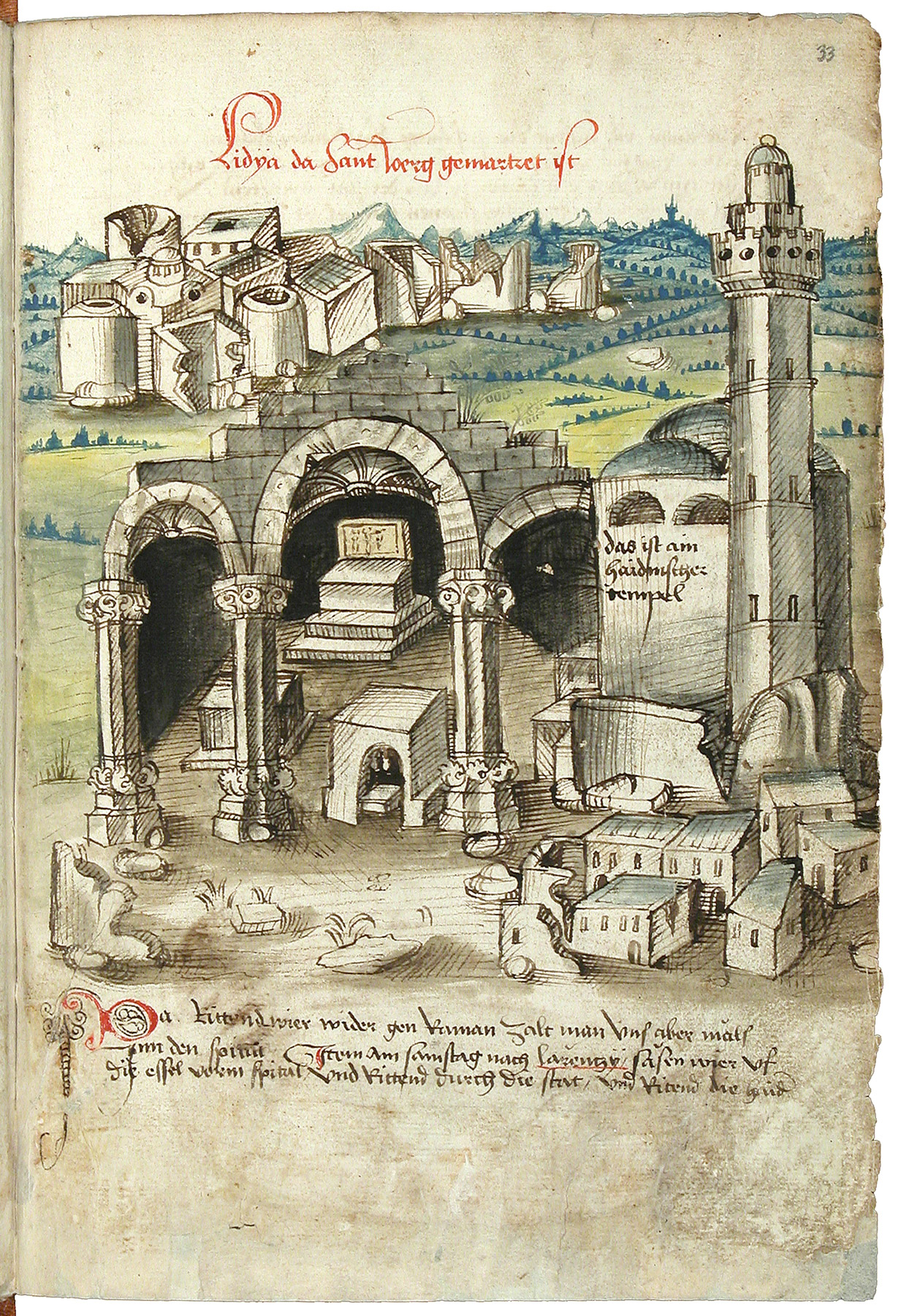
Lydda with ruined church over the tomb of St George and adjacent mosque (Konrad von Grünenberg, 1487

Sultan Baybars brought Lydda again under Muslim control by 1267–8. According to Qalqashandi, Lydda was an administrative centre of a wilaya during the fourteenth and fifteenth century in the Mamluk empire. Mujir al-Din described it as a pleasant village with an active Friday mosque. During this time, Lydda was a station on the postal route between Cairo and Damascus.

=== Ottoman period ===
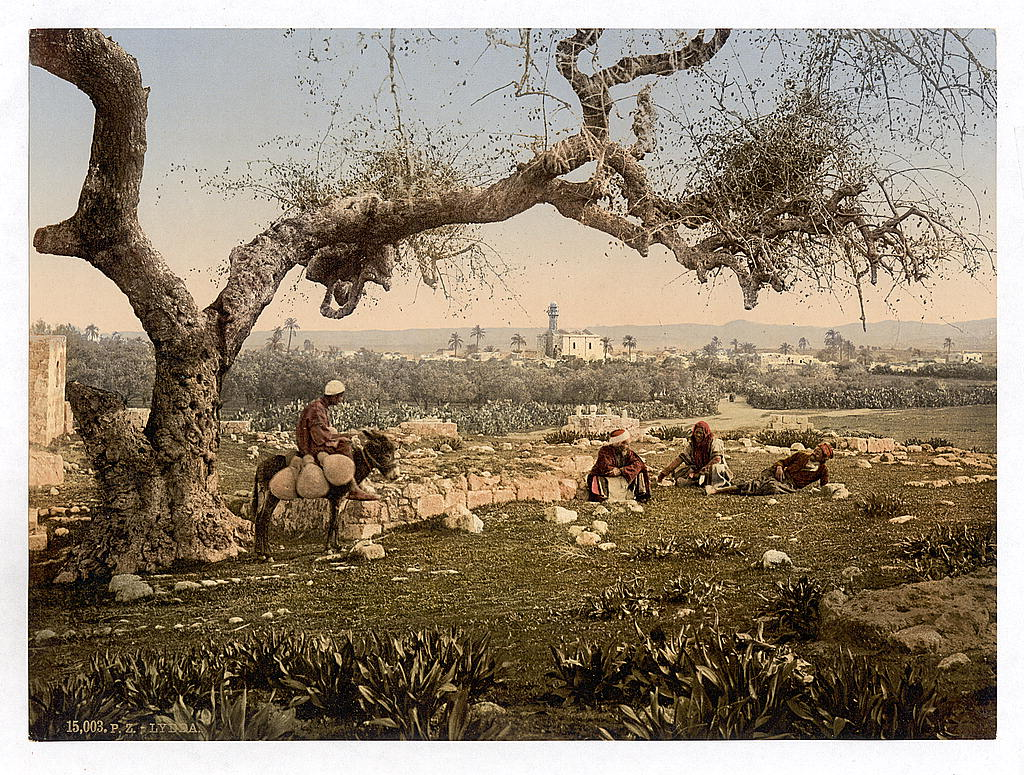
Lod, c.1890-1900

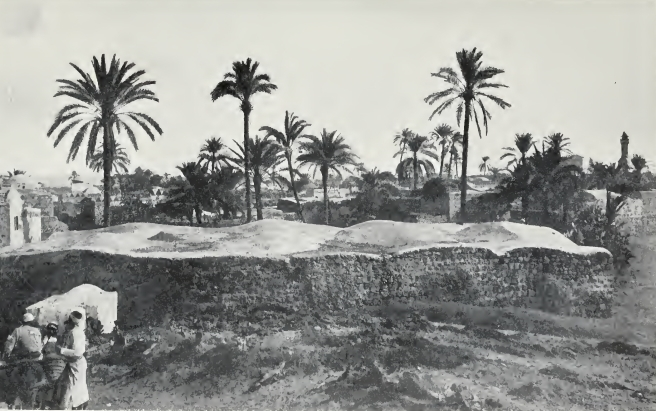
Lydda, 1903

In 1517, Lydda was incorporated into the Ottoman Empire as part of the Damascus Eyalet, and in the 1550s, the revenues of Lydda were designated for the new waqf of Hasseki Sultan Imaret in Jerusalem, established by Hasseki Hurrem Sultan (Roxelana), the wife of Suleiman the Magnificent.

By 1596 Lydda was a part of the nahiya ("subdistrict") of Ramla, which was under the administration of the liwa ("district") of Gaza. It had a population of 241 households and 14 bachelors who were all Muslims, and 233 households who were Christians. They paid a fixed tax-rate of 33,3 % on agricultural products, including wheat, barley, summer crops, vineyards, fruit trees, sesame, special product ("dawalib" =spinning wheels), goats and beehives, in addition to occasional revenues and market toll, a total of 45,000 Akçe. All of the revenue went to the Waqf.

In 1051 AH/1641/2, the Bedouin tribe of al-Sawālima from around Jaffa attacked the villages of Subṭāra, Bayt Dajan, al-Sāfiriya, Jindās, Lydda and Yāzūr belonging to Waqf Haseki Sultan.

The village appeared as Lydda, though misplaced, on the map of Pierre Jacotin compiled in 1799.

Missionary William M. Thomson visited Lydda in the mid-19th century, describing it as a "flourishing village of some 2,000 inhabitants, imbosomed in noble orchards of olive, fig, pomegranate, mulberry, sycamore, and other trees, surrounded every way by a very fertile neighbourhood. The inhabitants are evidently industrious and thriving, and the whole country between this and Ramleh is fast being filled up with their flourishing orchards. Rarely have I beheld a rural scene more delightful than this presented in early harvest ... It must be seen, heard, and enjoyed to be appreciated."

In 1869, the population of Ludd was given as: 55 Catholics, 1,940 "Greeks", 5 Protestants and 4,850 Muslims. In 1870, the Church of Saint George was rebuilt. In 1892, the first railway station in the entire region was established in the city. In the second half of the 19th century, Jewish merchants migrated to the city, but left after the 1921 Jaffa riots.

In 1882, the Palestine Exploration Fund's Survey of Western Palestine described Lod as "A small town, standing among enclosure of prickly pear, and having fine olive groves around it, especially to the south. The minaret of the mosque is a very conspicuous object over the whole of the plain. The inhabitants are principally Moslim, though the place is the seat of a Greek bishop resident of Jerusalem. The Crusading church has lately been restored, and is used by the Greeks. Wells are found in the gardens...."

=== British Mandate ===
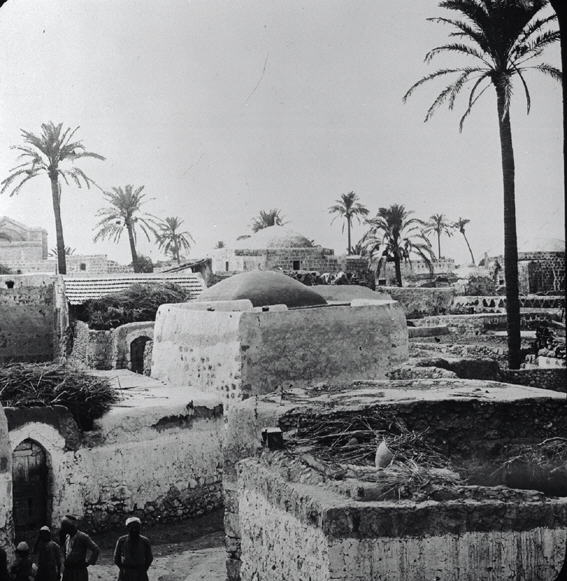
Lydda, 1920

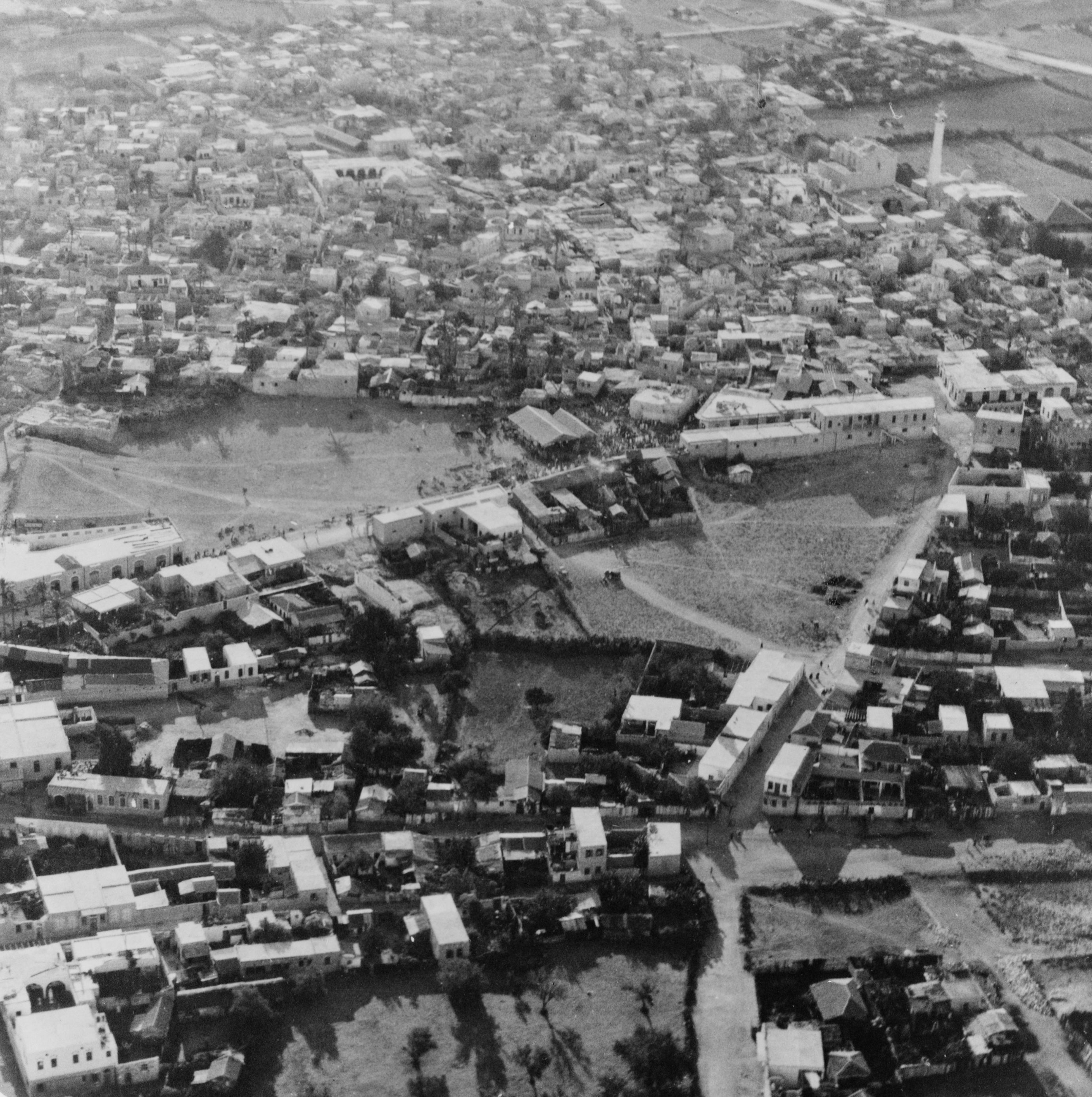
Lydda, 1932

From 1918, Lydda was under the administration of the British Mandate in Palestine, as per a League of Nations decree that followed the Great War. During the Second World War, the British set up supply posts in and around Lydda and its railway station, also building an airport that was renamed Ben Gurion Airport after the death of Israel's first prime minister in 1973.

At the time of the 1922 census of Palestine, Lydda had a population of 8,103 inhabitants (7,166 Muslims, 926 Christians, and 11 Jews), the Christians were 921 Orthodox, 4 Roman Catholics and 1 Melkite. This had increased by the 1931 census to 11,250 (10,002 Muslims, 1,210 Christians, 28 Jews, and 10 Bahai), in a total of 2475 residential houses.

In 1938, Lydda had a population of 12,750.

In 1945, Lydda had a population of 16,780 (14,910 Muslims, 1,840 Christians, 20 Jews and 10 "other"). Until 1948, Lydda was an Arab town with a population of around 20,000—18,500 Muslims and 1,500 Christians. In 1947, the United Nations proposed dividing Mandatory Palestine into two states, one Jewish state and one Arab; Lydda was to form part of the proposed Arab state. In the ensuing war, Israel captured Arab towns outside the area the UN had allotted it, including Lydda.

In December 1947, thirteen Jewish passengers in a seven-car convoy to Ben Shemen Youth Village were ambushed and murdered. In a separate incident, three Jewish youths, two men and a woman were captured, then raped and murdered in a neighbouring village. Their bodies were paraded in Lydda’s principal street.

=== State of Israel ===
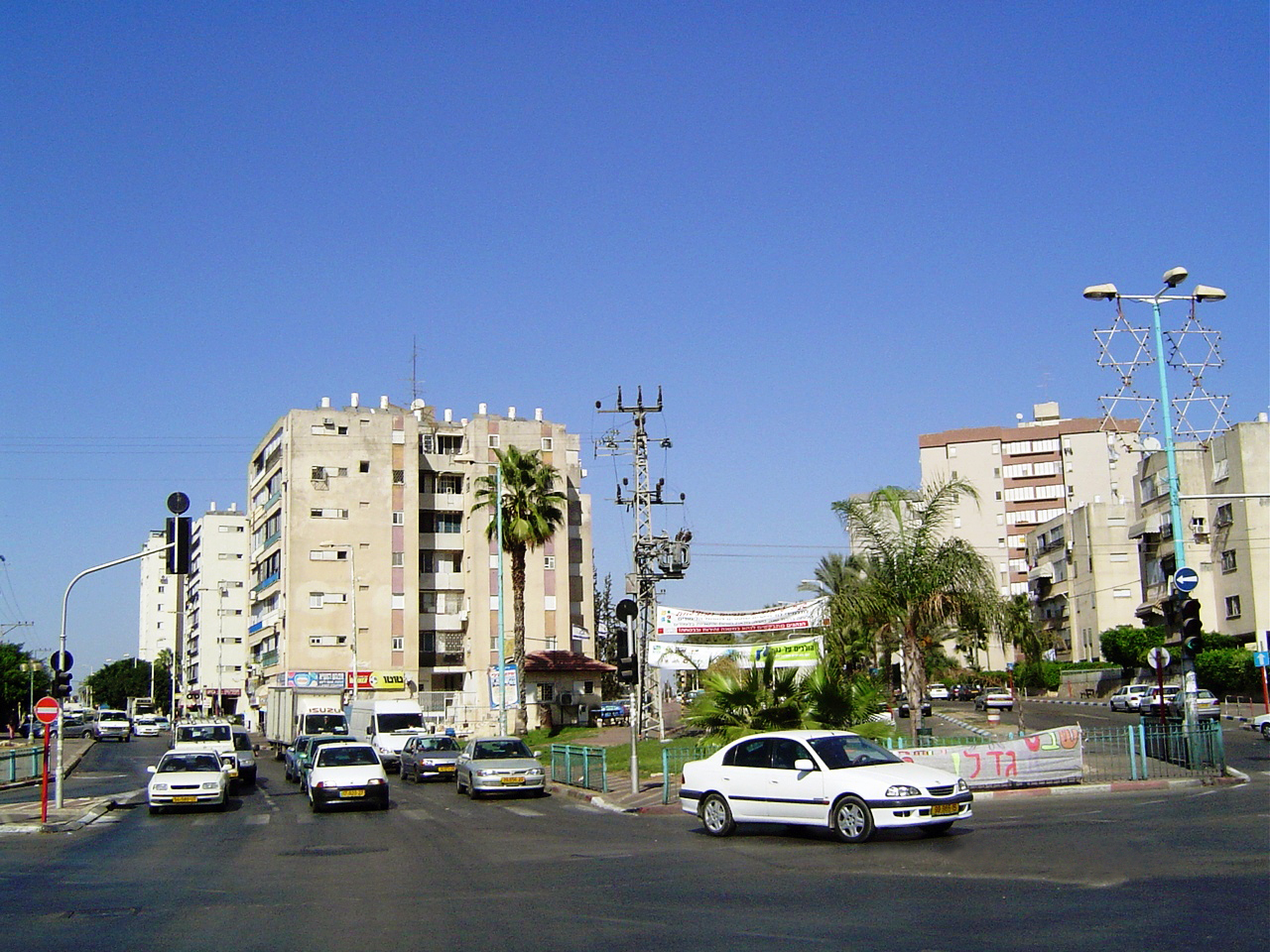
View of a Lod street, 2005

The Israel Defense Forces entered Lydda on 11 July 1948. The following day, under the impression that it was under attack, the 3rd Battalion was ordered to shoot anyone "seen on the streets". According to Israel, 250 Arabs were killed. Other estimates are higher: Arab historian Aref al Aref estimated 400, and Nimr al Khatib 1,700.

In 1948, the population rose to 50,000 during the Nakba, as Arab refugees fleeing other areas made their way there. A key event was the Palestinian expulsion from Lydda and Ramle, with the expulsion of 50,000-70,000 Palestinians from Lydda and Ramle by the Israel Defense Forces. All but 700 to 1,056 were expelled by order of the Israeli high command, and forced to walk 17 km (10 1/2 mi) to the Jordanian Arab Legion lines. Estimates of those who died from exhaustion and dehydration vary from a handful to 355. The town was subsequently sacked by the Israeli army. Some scholars, including Ilan Pappé, characterize this as ethnic cleansing. The few hundred Arabs who remained in the city were soon outnumbered by the influx of Jews who immigrated to Lod from August 1948 onward, most of them from Arab countries. As a result, Lod became a predominantly Jewish town.

After the establishment of the state, the biblical name Lod was readopted.

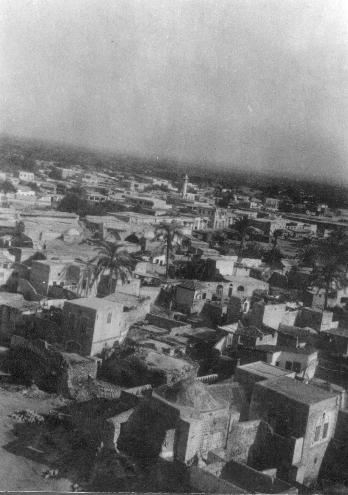
Lydda five months after Operation Danny. December 1948.

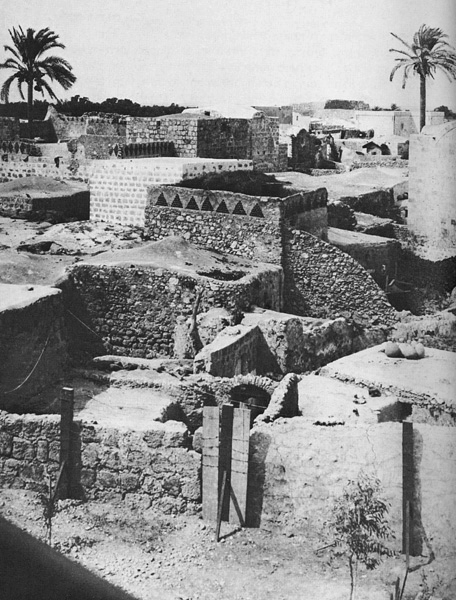
Lydda, 1948

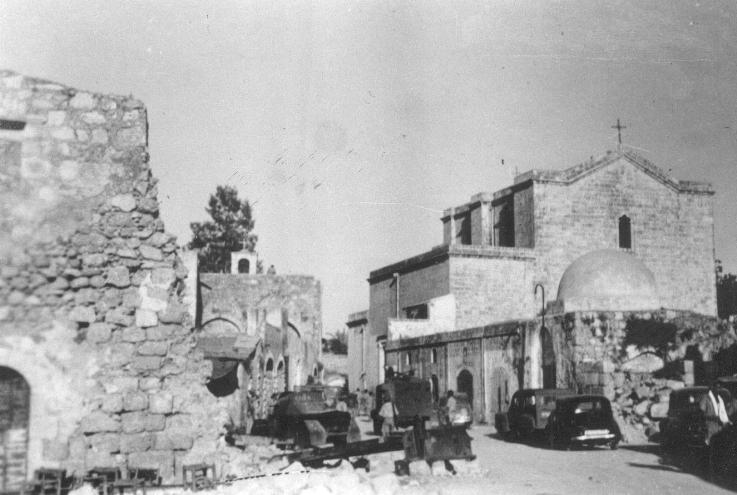
Church of Saint George and Mosque of Al-Khadr, after the battle. 1948

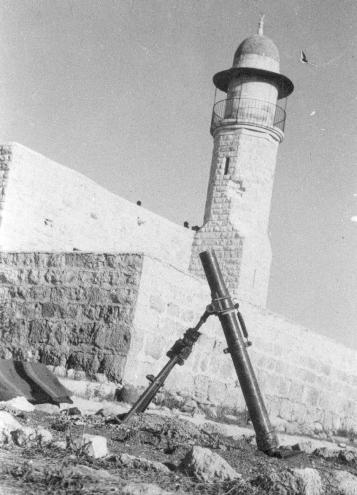
Palmach 3 inch mortar in front of Lydda mosque. 1948

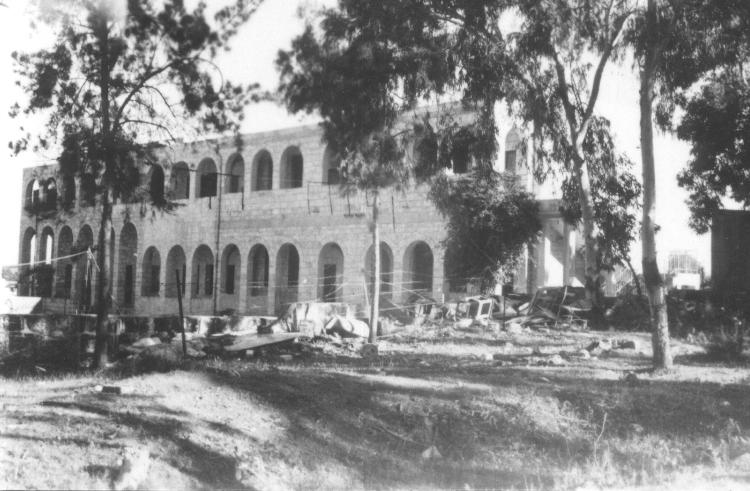

The Jewish immigrants who settled Lod came in waves, first from Morocco and Tunisia, later from Ethiopia, and then from the former Soviet Union.

Since 2008, many urban development projects have been undertaken to improve the image of the city. Upscale neighbourhoods have been built, among them Ganei Ya'ar and Ahisemah, expanding the city to the east. According to a 2010 report in the Economist, a three-meter-high wall was built between Jewish and Arab neighbourhoods and construction in Jewish areas was given priority over construction in Arab neighborhoods. The newspaper says that violent crime in the Arab sector revolves mainly around family feuds over turf and honour crimes. In 2010, the Lod Community Foundation organised an event for representatives of bicultural youth movements, volunteer aid organisations, educational start-ups, businessmen, sports organizations, and conservationists working on programmes to better the city.

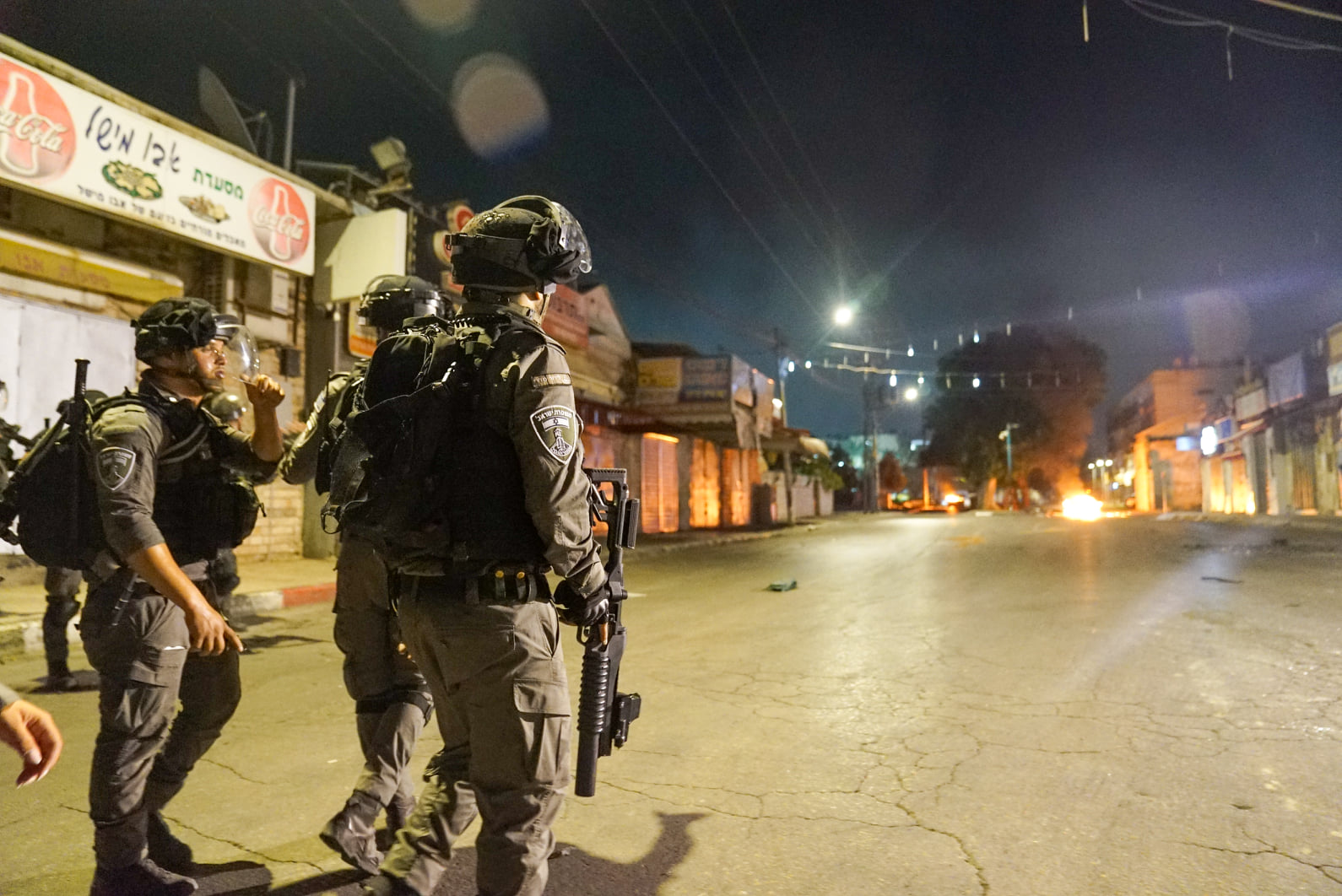
Israeli forces in Lod, 11 May 2021

In the 2021 Israel–Palestine crisis, a state of emergency was declared in Lod after Arab rioting led to the death of an Israeli Jew. The Mayor of Lod, Yair Revivio, urged Prime Minister of Israel Benjamin Netanyahu to deploy Israel Border Police to restore order in the city. This was the first time since 1966 that Israel had declared this kind of emergency lockdown. International media noted that both Jewish and Palestinian mobs were active in Lod, but the "crackdown came for one side" only.

== Demographics ==
Historical population
Year	Pop.	±%
1972	30,700	—
1983	40,600	+32.2%
1995	52,000	+28.1%
2008	69,400	+33.5%
2022	87,430	+26.0%
2024	94,189	+7.7%

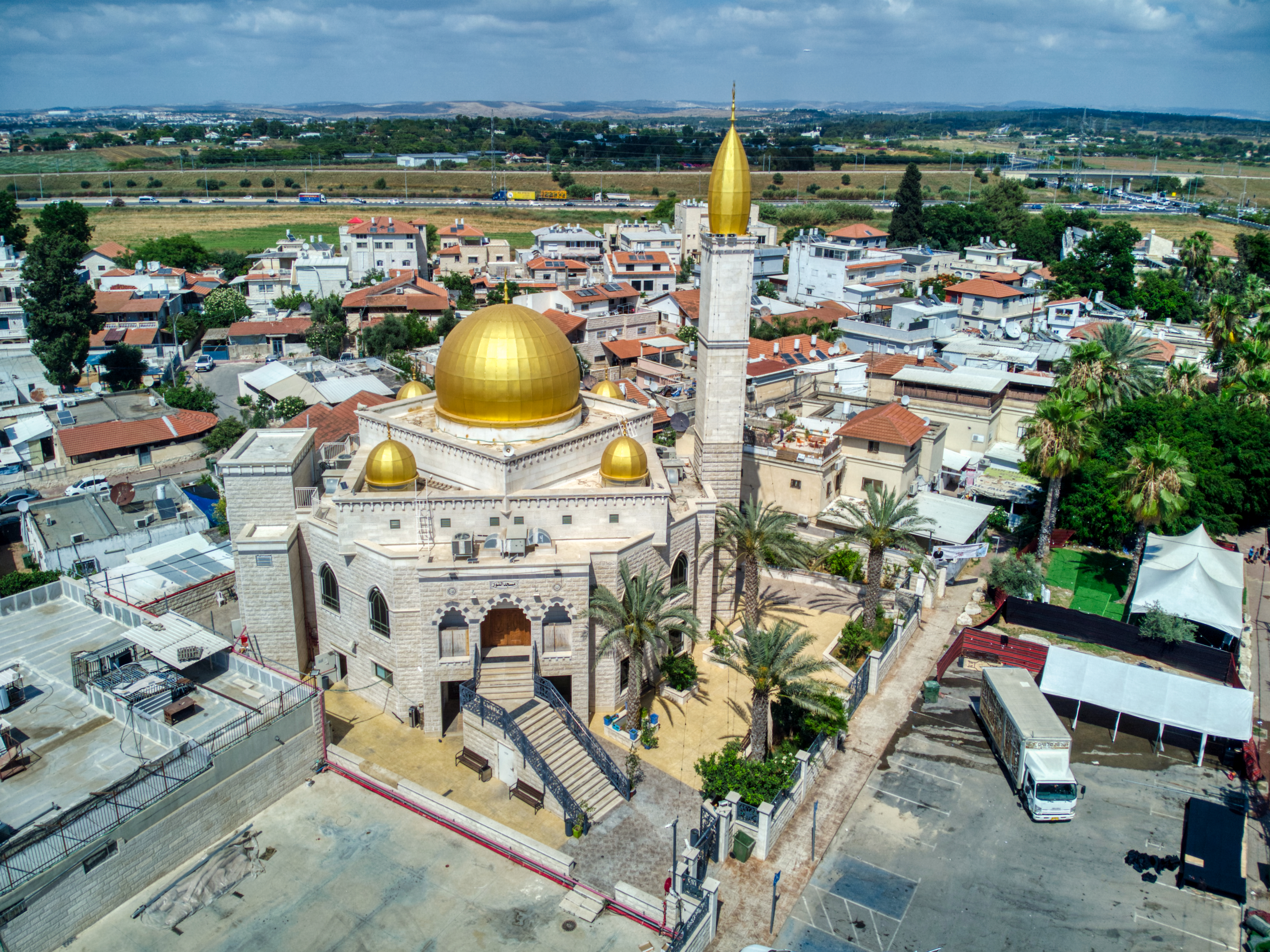
Al Nur Mosque

In the 19th century and until the Lydda Death March, Lod was an exclusively Muslim-Christian town, with an estimated 6,850 inhabitants, of whom approximately 2,000 (29%) were Christian.

According to the Israel Central Bureau of Statistics (CBS), the population of Lod in 2010 was 69,500 people.

According to the 2019 census, the population of Lod was 77,223, of which 53,581 people, comprising 69.4% of the city's population, were classified as "Jews and Others", and 23,642 people, comprising 30.6% as "Arab".

== Education ==
According to CBS, 38 schools and 13,188 pupils are in the city. They are spread out as 26 elementary schools and 8,325 elementary school pupils, and 13 high schools and 4,863 high school pupils. About 52.5% of 12th-grade pupils were entitled to a matriculation certificate in 2001.

== Economy ==
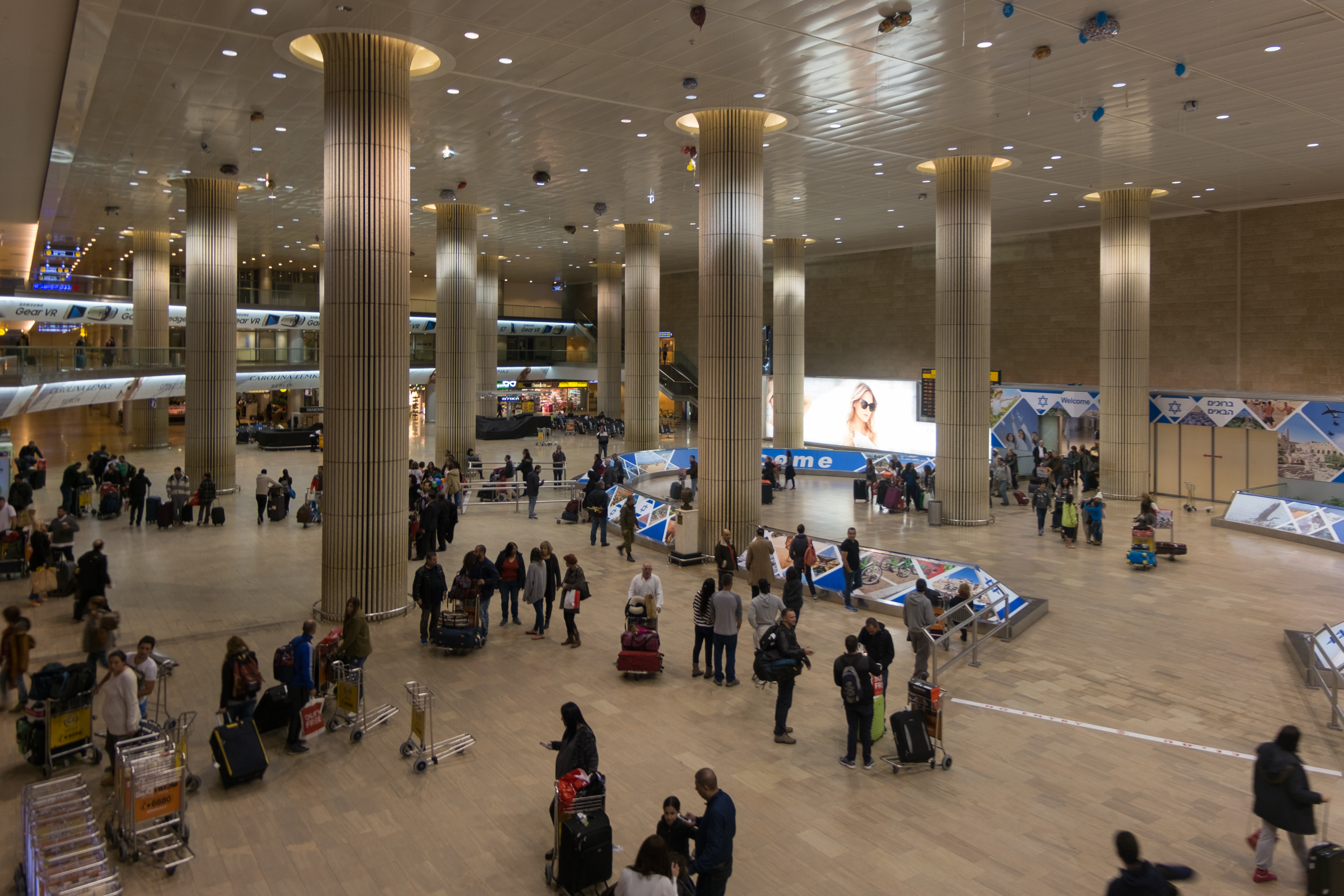
Reception hall, Ben Gurion International Airport

The airport and related industries are a major source of employment for the residents of Lod. Other important factories in the city are the communication equipment company "Talard", "Cafe-Co" - a subsidiary of the Strauss Group and "Kashev" - the computer center of Bank Leumi.

A Jewish Agency Absorption Centre is also located in Lod. According to CBS figures for 2000, 23,032 people were salaried workers and 1,405 were self-employed. The mean monthly wage for a salaried worker was NIS 4,754, a real change of 2.9% over the course of 2000. Salaried men had a mean monthly wage of NIS 5,821 (a real change of 1.4%) versus NIS 3,547 for women (a real change of 4.6%). The mean income for the self-employed was NIS 4,991. About 1,275 people were receiving unemployment benefits and 7,145 were receiving an income supplement.

== Art and culture ==
In 2009-2010, Dor Guez held an exhibit, Georgeopolis, at the Petach Tikva art museum that focuses on Lod.

== Archaeology ==
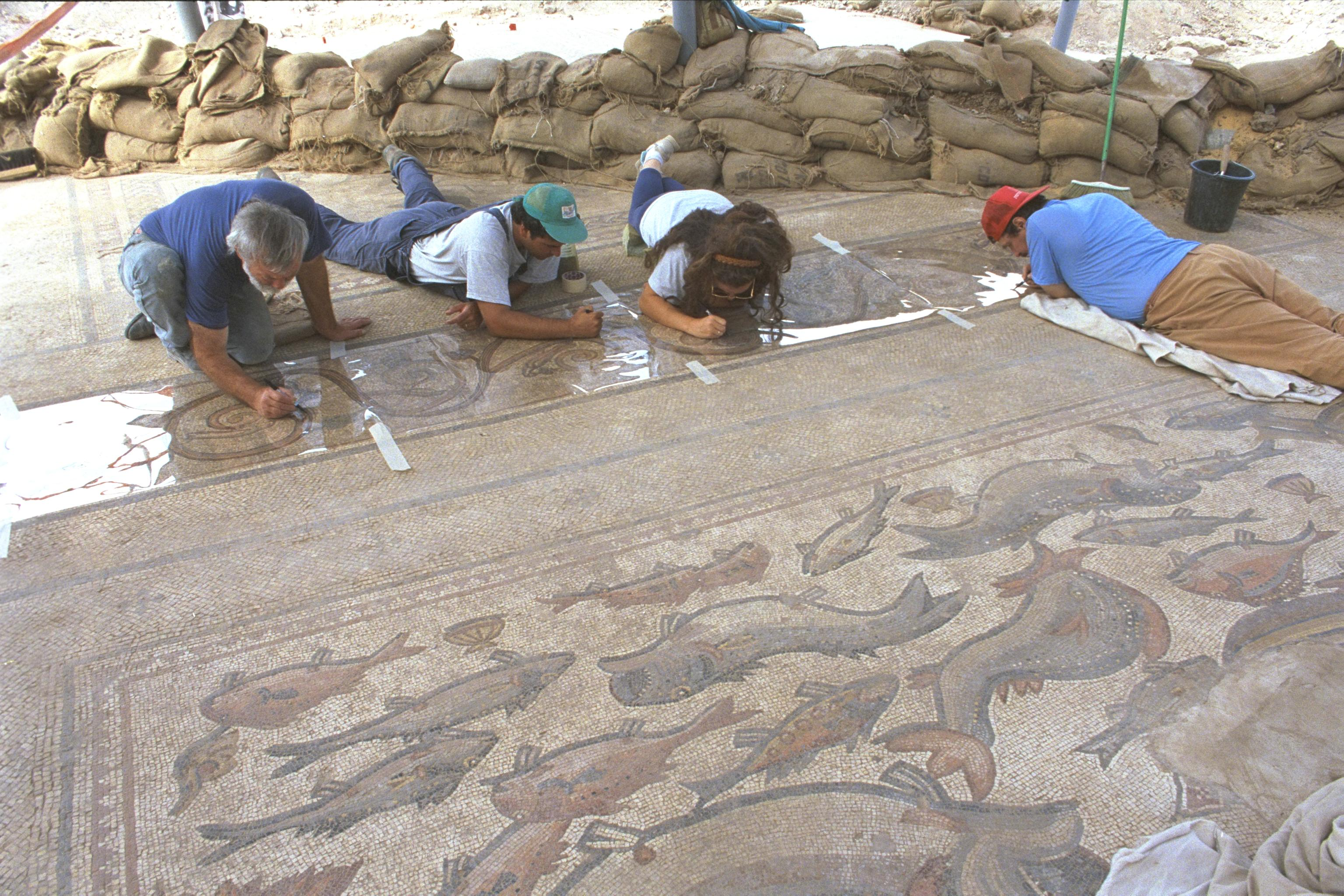
Archaeologists working on mosaic floor

A well-preserved mosaic floor dating to the Roman period was excavated in 1996 as part of a salvage dig conducted on behalf of the Israel Antiquities Authority and the Municipality of Lod, prior to widening HeHalutz Street. According to Jacob Fisch, executive director of the Friends of the Israel Antiquities Authority, a worker at the construction site noticed the tail of a tiger and halted work. The mosaic was initially covered over with soil at the conclusion of the excavation for lack of funds to conserve and develop the site. The mosaic is now part of the Lod Mosaic Archaeological Center. The floor, with its colorful display of birds, fish, exotic animals and merchant ships, is believed to have been commissioned by a wealthy resident of the city for his private home.

The Lod Community Archaeology Program, which operates in ten Lod schools, five Jewish and five Israeli Arab, combines archaeological studies with participation in digs in Lod.

== Sports ==
The city's major football club, Hapoel Bnei Lod, plays in Liga Leumit (the second division). Its home is at the Lod Municipal Stadium. The club was formed by a merger of Bnei Lod and Rakevet Lod in the 1980s. Two other clubs in the city play in the regional leagues: Hapoel MS Ortodoxim Lod in Liga Bet and Maccabi Lod in Liga Gimel.

Hapoel Lod played in the top division during the 1960s and 1980s, and won the State Cup in 1984. The club folded in 2002. A new club, Hapoel Maxim Lod (named after former mayor Maxim Levy) was established soon after, but folded in 2007.

== Voting Patterns ==
In the 2022 election, 59 percent of voters in Lod voted for the parties of the right-wing coalition led by Benjamin Netanyahu, while 18 percent voted for the parties of the center-left coalition led by Yair Lapid and 20 percent voted for the Arab parties.

In the 2026 election, 51 percent of voters in Lod voted for the parties of the right-wing coalition led by Benjamin Netanyahu, while 25 percent voted for the Arab parties and 18 percent voted for the parties of the center-left coalition led by Gadi Eisenkot. An additional 2.2 percent voted for the Reservists, and 1.7 percent voted for Amcha Yisrael. Voter turnout increased 28 percent from the 2022 election.

== Climate ==
Climate data for Lod
Month	Jan	Feb	Mar	Apr	May	Jun	Jul	Aug	Sep	Oct	Nov	Dec	Year
Mean daily maximum °C (°F)	18.4 (65.1)	19.2 (66.6)	21.8 (71.2)	25.6 (78.1)	28.8 (83.8)	31.0 (87.8)	32.7 (90.9)	32.8 (91.0)	31.7 (89.1)	28.4 (83.1)	25.2 (77.4)	20.6 (69.1)	26.4 (79.4)
Mean daily minimum °C (°F)	8.9 (48.0)	9.2 (48.6)	10.9 (51.6)	13.8 (56.8)	16.9 (62.4)	20.2 (68.4)	22.8 (73.0)	23.4 (74.1)	21.8 (71.2)	18.7 (65.7)	14.1 (57.4)	10.8 (51.4)	16.0 (60.7)
Average rainfall mm (inches)	147.8 (5.82)	109.3 (4.30)	61.0 (2.40)	14.8 (0.58)	2.7 (0.11)	0.2 (0.01)	0.0 (0.0)	0.0 (0.0)	0.7 (0.03)	22.8 (0.90)	74.9 (2.95)	123.9 (4.88)	558.1 (21.98)
Average rainy days (≥ 0.1 mm)	12.2	10.9	8.1	2.8	1.3	0.2	0.0	0.0	0.5	3.2	7.0	10.3	56.5
Source: World Meteorological Organization (temperatures 1995–2009, rainfall and rain days 1981–2010)

== Notable people ==
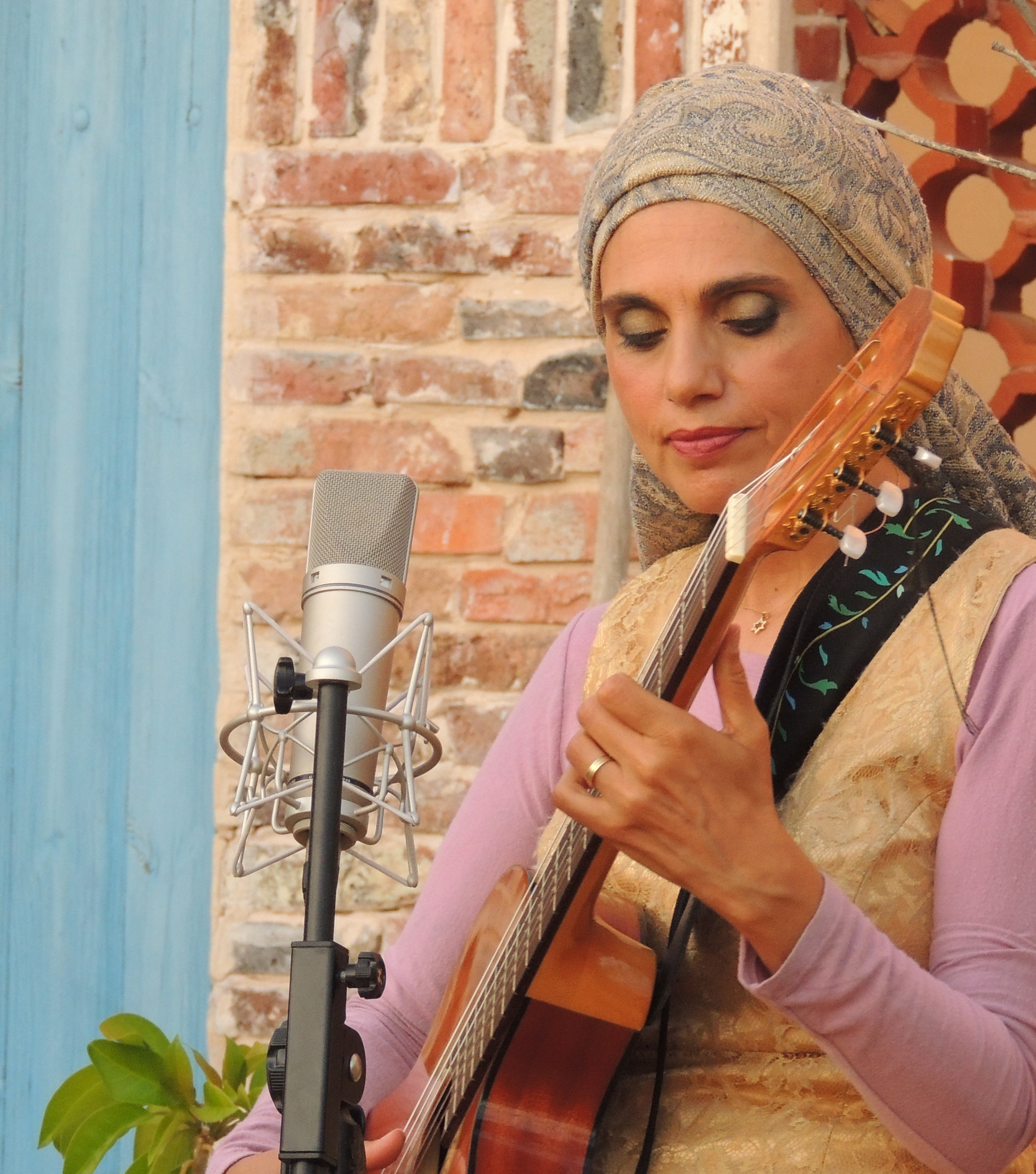
Etti Ankri

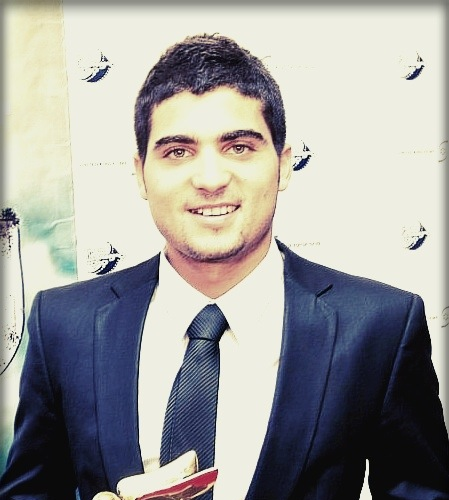
Oshri Cohen

- Rabbi Akiva, Talmudic sage
- Etti Ankri (born 1963), singer
- Oshri Cohen (born 1984), actor
- Artem Dolgopyat (born 1997), Olympic champion and world champion gymnast
- St George, Patron Saint of Beirut, Palestine, England, Russia, and Catalonia
- George Habash (1926–2008), founder of the Popular Front for the Liberation of Palestine
- Eliezer ben Hurcanus, Talmudic sage
- Joshua ben Levi, Talmudic sage
- Tamer Nafar (born 1979), rapper
- Suhell Nafar, rapper
- Simcha Rothman (born 1980), Knesset member, Religious Zionist Party
- Rabbi Tarfon, Talmudic sage
- Salim Tuama (born 1979), footballer
- Sami Abu Shehadeh (born 1975), politician

== Twin towns-sister cities ==
Lod is twinned with:

- Piatra Neamț, Romania
- Kraljevo, Serbia

== See also ==
- Depopulated Palestinian locations in Israel
- Operation Danny

== Bibliography ==
- Barron, J. B., ed. (1923). Palestine: Report and General Abstracts of the Census of 1922. Government of Palestine.
- Blumenthal, M. (2013). Goliath: Life and Loathing in Greater Israel. Nation Books. ISBN 978-1-56858-634-2. - Profile at Google Books
- Conder, C. R.; Kitchener, H. H. (1882). The Survey of Western Palestine: Memoirs of the Topography, Orography, Hydrography, and Archaeology. Vol. 2. London: Committee of the Palestine Exploration Fund.
- Dauphin, C. (1998). La Palestine byzantine, Peuplement et Populations. BAR International Series 726 (in French). Vol. III : Catalogue. Oxford: Archeopress. ISBN 978-0-86054-905-5.
- Department of Statistics (1945). Village Statistics, April, 1945. Government of Palestine.
- Gorzalczany, Amir; et al. (2016-05-09). "Lod, the Lod Mosaic" (128). Hadashot Arkheologiyot – Excavations and Surveys in Israel.
- Guérin, V. (1875). Description Géographique Historique et Archéologique de la Palestine (in French). Vol. 2: Samarie, pt. 2. Paris: L'Imprimerie Nationale. (p. 392)
- Hadawi, S. (1970). Village Statistics of 1945: A Classification of Land and Area ownership in Palestine. Palestine Liberation Organization Research Centre.
- Holder, Meir (1986). History of the Jewish People From Yavne to Pumbedisa. Mesorah Publications. ISBN 978-0-89906-499-4.
- Holmes, R.; Strachan, H.; Bellamy, C.; Bicheno, Hugh (2001). The Oxford companion to military history (Illustrated ed.). Oxford University Press. ISBN 978-0-19-866209-9.
- Hütteroth, W.-D.; Abdulfattah, K. (1977). Historical Geography of Palestine, Transjordan and Southern Syria in the Late 16th Century. Erlanger Geographische Arbeiten, Sonderband 5. Erlangen, Germany: Vorstand der Fränkischen Geographischen Gesellschaft. ISBN 978-3-920405-41-4.
- Karmon, Y. (1960). "An Analysis of Jacotin's Map of Palestine" (PDF). Israel Exploration Journal. 10 (3, 4): 155–173, 244–253. Archived from the original (PDF) on 2019-12-22.
- Le Strange, G. (1890). Palestine Under the Moslems: A Description of Syria and the Holy Land from A.D. 650 to 1500. Committee of the Palestine Exploration Fund.
- Mills, E., ed. (1932). Census of Palestine 1931. Population of Villages, Towns and Administrative Areas. Jerusalem: Government of Palestine.
- Monterescu, Daniel; Rabinowitz, Dan (2012). Mixed towns, trapped communities: historical narratives, spatial dynamics, gender relations and cultural encounters in Palestinian-Israeli towns (Illustrated ed.). Ashgate Publishing, Ltd. ISBN 978-1-4094-8746-3.
- Morris, B. (2004). The Birth of the Palestinian Refugee Problem Revisited. Cambridge University Press. ISBN 978-0-521-00967-6.
- Moudjir ed-dyn (1876). Sauvaire (ed.). Histoire de Jérusalem et d'Hébron depuis Abraham jusqu'à la fin du XVe siècle de J.-C. : fragments de la Chronique de Moudjir-ed-dyn.
- Palmer, E. H. (1881). The Survey of Western Palestine: Arabic and English Name Lists Collected During the Survey by Lieutenants Conder and Kitchener, R. E. Transliterated and Explained by E.H. Palmer. Committee of the Palestine Exploration Fund.
- Petersen, Andrew (2001). A Gazetteer of Buildings in Muslim Palestine (British Academy Monographs in Archaeology). Vol. 1. Oxford University Press. ISBN 978-0-19-727011-0. Archived from the original on 2021-05-28.
- Petersen, Andrew (2005). The Towns of Palestine Under Muslim Rule. British Archaeological Reports. ISBN 978-1-84171-821-7.
- Pringle, D. (1998). The Churches of the Crusader Kingdom of Jerusalem: L-Z (excluding Tyre). Vol. II. Cambridge University Press. ISBN 978-0-521-39037-8.
- Robinson, E.; Smith, E. (1841). Biblical Researches in Palestine, Mount Sinai and Arabia Petraea: A Journal of Travels in the year 1838. Vol. 3. Boston: Crocker & Brewster. (pp.49 −55)
- Rozenfeld, Ben Tsiyon (2010). Torah Centers and Rabbinic Activity in Palestine, 70–400 CE: History and Geographic Distribution. BRILL. ISBN 978-90-04-17838-0.
- Sa'di, A. H.; Abu-Lughod, L. (2007). Nakba: Palestine, 1948, and the claims of memory (Illustrated ed.). Columbia University Press. ISBN 978-0-231-13579-5.
- Shahin, Mariam (2005). Palestine: A Guide. Interlink Books. ISBN 978-1-56656-557-8.
- Singer, A. (2002). Constructing Ottoman Beneficence: An Imperial Soup Kitchen in Jerusalem. Albany: State University of New York Press. ISBN 978-0-7914-5352-0.
- Smallwood, E. M. (2001). The Jews under Roman rule: From Pompey to Diocletian: A Study in Political Relations. Leiden: Brill. ISBN 978-0-391-04155-4.
- Tal, D. (2004). War in Palestine, 1948: Strategy and diplomacy. London: Routledge. ISBN 978-0-7146-5275-7.
- Thomson, W. M. (1859). The Land and the Book: Or, Biblical Illustrations Drawn from the Manners and Customs, the Scenes and Scenery, of the Holy Land. Vol. 2 (1 ed.). New York: Harper & brothers.
- Yacobi, Haim (2009). Goliath:The Jewish-Arab City: Spatio-politics in a mixed community. Routledge. ISBN 978-1-134-06584-4.
- al-Ẓāhirī, Khalīl Ibn Shāhīn, Ghars al-Dīn Khalīl ibn Shāhīn (1894). Zoubdat kachf el-mamâlik: tableau politique et administratif de l'Égypte. E. Leroux.
