= Max Blumenthal =

American journalist (born 1977)

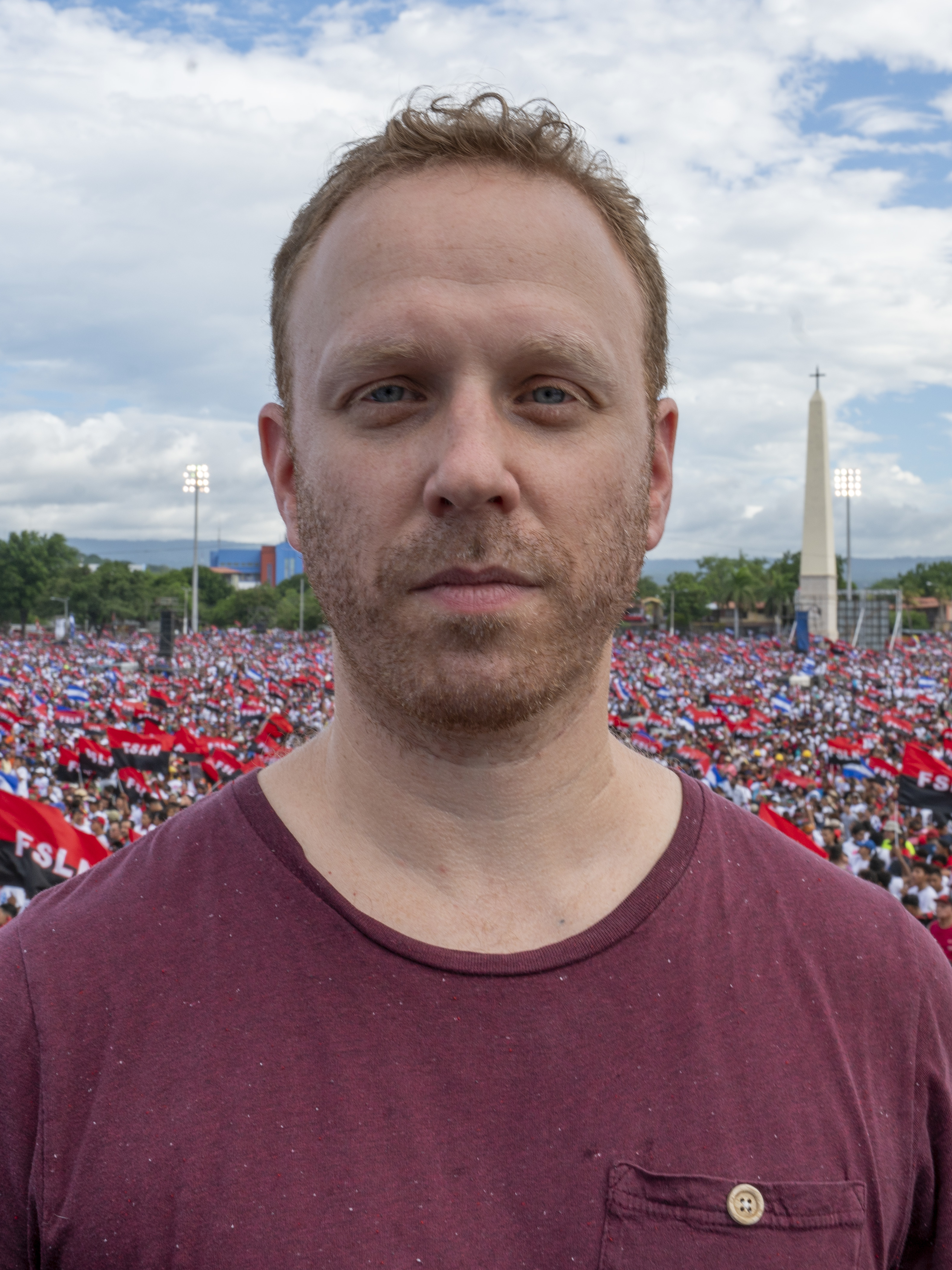
- Blumenthal in 2019
- Born: December 18, 1977 (age 48); Boston, Massachusetts, U.S.
- Education: University of Pennsylvania (BA)
- Occupations: Journalist; author; blogger
- Spouse: Anya Parampil (m. 2020)
- Relatives: Sidney Blumenthal (father)
- Writing career
- Years active: 2002–present
- Subjects: US politics; Israeli–Palestinian conflict; Syrian civil war
- Notable works: Republican Gomorrah (2009); Goliath (2013); The 51 Day War (2015); The Management of Savagery (2019)

Max Blumenthal (born December 18, 1977) is an American journalist, author, blogger, and filmmaker. He was a writer for The Nation, AlterNet, The Daily Beast, Al Akhbar, Mondoweiss, and Media Matters for America, and has contributed to Al Jazeera English, The New York Times and the Los Angeles Times. He has been a writing fellow of the Nation Institute. He is also a contributor to Sputnik and RT.

Blumenthal is the editor of The Grayzone website, described by many as fringe and known for its criticism of US foreign policy and its positive, often apologetic coverage of the Chinese, Russian, Venezuelan, and Ba'athist Syrian governments, including its denial of chemical attacks by the Syrian government and of human rights abuses against Uyghurs. He has written extensively about Israel, and is sharply critical of the conduct of its government.

Blumenthal has written four books. His first, Republican Gomorrah: Inside the Movement That Shattered the Party (2009), made the Los Angeles Times and New York Times bestsellers lists. He was awarded the 2014 Lannan Foundation Cultural Freedom Award for an Especially Notable Book for Goliath: Life and Loathing in Greater Israel, which was published in 2013.

== Early life and education ==
Blumenthal was born on December 18, 1977, in Boston, Massachusetts, to Jacqueline (née Jordan) and Sidney Blumenthal. He is Jewish. His father is a journalist and writer who served as an aide to President Bill Clinton. Blumenthal attended Georgetown Day School in Washington, D.C. He graduated from the University of Pennsylvania in 1999 with a Bachelor of Arts degree in history.

== Affiliations ==
Prior to 2015, Blumenthal's articles and video reports were published by Washington Monthly (in 2003 and 2005), The Nation (2005–2015), The Daily Beast (2008–09), The Huffington Post (2009–2011), The New York Times (in 2009 and 2014), the Los Angeles Times (2009), Columbia Journalism Review (2011) and Al Jazeera English (2013).

In late 2011, Blumenthal joined Lebanon's Al Akhbar newspaper primarily to write about the Israeli–Palestinian conflict and foreign-policy debates in Washington, D.C. When he left the publication in June 2012 in protest at its coverage of the Syrian Civil War, he considered the newspaper to have a pro-Assad editorial line followed by such individuals as Amal Saad-Ghorayeb. He wrote that it "gave me more latitude than any paper in the United States to write about... Israel and Palestine", but he had ultimately tired of "jousting with Assad apologists". He added: "In the end, Assad will be remembered as an authoritarian tyrant." Blumenthal formerly contributed weekly articles to the AlterNet website, serving as a senior writer from September 2014.

Since his visit to Moscow, Blumenthal has contributed to broadcasts on RT (formerly known as Russia Today) on many occasions. In December 2015, during a visit to Moscow presumed by multiple sources to have been paid for by the Kremlin, Blumenthal was a guest at RT's 10 Years On Air anniversary party attended by President Vladimir Putin, then-Lieutenant General Michael Flynn of the United States and English politician Ken Livingstone. In an interview with Tucker Carlson on Fox News in November 2017, Blumenthal defended RT against "the charge that it's Kremlin propaganda."

He has contributed on multiple occasions to Russia's state owned Sputnik radio, as well as to Iran's state owned Press TV and China's state-run CGTN. Blumenthal founded The Grayzone website within a month after his visit to Moscow. In an October 2019 article for New Politics magazine, London-based Lebanese academic Gilbert Achcar wrote that Blumenthal's Grayzone, along with the World Socialist Web Site, has "the habit of demonizing all left-wing critics of Putin and the likes of Assad by describing them as 'agents of imperialism' or some equivalent".

== Reporting ==
=== Immigration (2002–2014) ===
Blumenthal won the Online News Association's Independent Feature Award for his 2002 Salon article, "Day of the Dead". In the article, he concluded the homicides of hundreds of women in Ciudad Juárez, Chihuahua, Mexico were connected to the policies of corporate interests in the border city. Blumenthal wrote about the rise of the "Minuteman" movement for Salon in 2003, describing its members as "border vigilantes" who "have harassed and detained hundreds, perhaps thousands, of migrants suspected of entering the country illegally."

In 2010, Blumenthal covered the federal immigration enforcement program known as Operation Streamline for Truthdig. "The program represents the entrenchment of a parallel nonproductive economy promoting abuse behind the guise of law enforcement and crime deterrence", he wrote.

Blumenthal testified as a prosecution witness for the Mexican American Legal Defense and Educational Fund in their civil suit, known as Vicente v. Barnett, against Arizona businessman Roger Barnett. Barnett was ordered to pay $73,000 in damages for assaulting a group of migrants near the US–Mexico border.

In 2014, Blumenthal covered hunger strikes by undocumented migrants held in the privatized Northwest Detention Center for The Nation.

=== American conservatism ===
In June 2007, Blumenthal attended the Take Back America Conference (sponsored by the Campaign for America's Future), where he interviewed both supporters of Barack Obama (D-Illinois) and 9/11 conspiracy theorists. Blumenthal said that conference organizers were angered by the video, and refused to air it.

Blumenthal made a short video titled Generation Chickenhawk (2007). It featured interviews with attendees at the July 2007 College Republican National Convention in Washington, D.C. Blumenthal asked why they, as Iraq War supporters, had not enlisted in the United States Armed Forces.

In August 2007, Blumenthal made a short video called Rapture Ready, about American Christian fundamentalists' support for the State of Israel.

=== Republican Gomorrah (2009) ===
Blumenthal's book, Republican Gomorrah: Inside the Movement That Shattered the Party (2009), was a bestseller on both the Los Angeles Times and New York Times bestsellers lists. The work was inspired by the psychologist Erich Fromm who analyzed the personality of those "eager to surrender their freedom" via an identification with authoritarian causes and powerful leaders.

For Blumenthal, a "culture of personal crisis" has defined the American "radical right". In a 2009 interview with CNN, he commented: "The GOP has become subsumed by dysfunctional personalities with no capacity for restraining themselves, either from acting out hysterically or from their most devious urges. For these internally conflicted figures, who will continue to produce new and increasingly bizarre scandals, right-wing political crusading is simply a form of self-medication."

=== Israel and Palestine ===
==== Feeling the Hate (2009 video) ====
In early June 2009, Blumenthal posted a 3-minute video on YouTube, titled Feeling the Hate in Jerusalem on the Eve of Obama's Cairo Address. The video was recorded the day before President Barack Obama's Cairo address on June 4 and showed man-on-the-street interviews with possibly drunk Jewish-American young people in Jerusalem. According to Tablet, the Americans interviewed "spewed racist vitriol about the president while asserting a strikingly meatheaded brand of Jewish pride". Some of those interviewed used obscenities and racist rhetoric about President Obama and Arabs, referring to Obama as a "nigger" and "like a terrorist". According to The Jerusalem Post, the video "garnered massive exposure and caused a firestorm in the media and the Jewish world". A Bradley Burston op-ed in Haaretz described the video as "an overnight Internet sensation".

Blumenthal's video gained 400,000 views before YouTube removed it for unspecified terms-of-use violations. The Huffington Post had refused to publish it, and its Tel Aviv sequel was briefly on that website, before it resurfaced on Mondoweiss. Referring to the Jerusalem video, the Jewish Telegraphic Agency quoted Blumenthal as stating: "I won't ascribe motives to YouTube I am unable to confirm, but it is clear there is an active campaign by right-wing Jewish elements to suppress the video by filing a flood of complaints with YouTube".

Referring to death threats he had received for publishing the video, he ascribed individuals "emotional need to stop this video by eliminating" him as "a feature of right-wing psychology around the world". Blumenthal saw his interviewees as part of the "indoctrination" of Taglit-Birthright tours intended for diaspora Jews, in which he had himself participated in 2002. Around 2009, he described himself as a "non-Zionist" liberal, and considered the identification of anti-Zionism with antisemitism as a "cynical ploy by the Israel lobby".

==== Dispute with Karen J. Greenberg (2011) ====
In 2011, Blumenthal wrote in The eXile that Israeli occupation forces and Bahraini monarchy guards trained American police departments in anti-protester techniques, including torture, and quoted Fordham University Law Professor Karen J. Greenberg. Contacted by Jeffrey Goldberg of The Atlantic and Adam Serwer of Mother Jones, Greenberg told Goldberg that while she "never made such a statement", Blumenthal "was looking for corroboration but I told him I didn't have any." She told Serwer that "I did not intend to assert these allegations as fact ... the entire sense of the quote is inaccurate."

Blumenthal said that he had quoted Greenberg accurately, accused her of denying she had made the statement, and believed that she had since been "intimidated by Goldberg and the pro-Israel forces he represents." Greenberg had made the same comments to Adam Serwer of Mother Jones.

==== Goliath (2013) ====
Blumenthal has written two books based on the periods of time he spent in Gaza and the Israeli-occupied territories in the West Bank. He documented what he said were Israeli and Palestinian war crimes in two books: Goliath: Life and Loathing in Greater Israel (2013) and The 51 Day War: Ruin and Resistance in Gaza (2015).

Goliath, published by Nation Books, outlines what Blumenthal characterizes as Israel's aggressive shift to the far-right, and its crackdown on local activism. In the preface, he writes: "Americans' tax dollars and political support [...] are crucial in sustaining the present state of affairs" in Israel. The book consists of 73 short chapters. Chapter titles include "To the Slaughter", "The Concentration Camp", "The Night of Broken Glass", "This Belongs to the White Man" and "How to Kill Goyim and Influence People".

The book received a positive review from Nancy Murray in Race & Class, calling it "a work of unsettling but scrupulous and courageous truth-telling". It was also positively reviewed in the Journal of Palestine Studies by Steven Salaita, who called it "one of the most important titles published on the Israel-Palestine conflict in the past few years".

Eric Alterman, writing for The Nation wrote that its author "proves a profoundly unreliable narrator" and his book will "do nothing to advance the interests of the occupation's victims." His article and an extract from Blumenthal's book in the same issue led to many letters being received by The Nation, several of which were published in the next issue rebuking The Nation for publishing Alterman's article. Abdeen Jabara, past president of the American Arab Anti-Discrimination Committee, wrote that he was troubled by The Nation presenting "two sides" by allowing Alterman to do a "hatchet job" on Blumenthal's work, because "there is no equivalency between whatever Palestinians have done or are doing and what Israel and Zionism have done to the Palestinians." Other correspondents, among them Charles H. Manekin, Professor of Philosophy at the University of Maryland and former Director of the Meyerhoff Center for Jewish Studies, challenged the accuracy of Alterman's article. Alterman's statement in his original piece about the book being "technically accurate" was queried and he explained it was an issue of context, as Blumenthal "tells us only the facts he wishes us to know and withholds crucial ones that undermine his relentlessly anti-Israel narrative." Jonathan S. Tobin, writing in Commentary magazine, described the book as having a "complete lack of intellectual merit or integrity".

An event was held at the University of Pennsylvania on October 17, 2013, featuring Ian Lustick and Blumenthal discussing Goliath. Blumenthal objected to what he saw as "Israel's attempt to engineer and maintain a Jewish, non-indigenous majority." Blumenthal said: "there is absolutely no way for Jewish people in Israel/Palestine to become indigenized under the present order. And that's what really has to happen." Consequently, they should be "willing to be a part of the Arab world." A "choice needs to be placed to the Israeli Jewish population" (which he also referred to as the "settler-colonial population") "and it can only be placed to them through external pressure." "The maintenance and engineering of a non-indigenous demographic majority is non-negotiable", he said.

Philip Weiss of the Mondoweiss website responded to Blumenthal's comments saying that "similar attitudes about indigenous culture have been used in intolerant ways in our society. I see some intolerance in that answer." In the Acknowledgements to Goliath, Blumenthal wrote that websites such as Electronic Intifada and Mondoweiss had "provided essential outlets for much of the reporting" contained in the book. Petra Marquardt-Bigman wrote that the "single-minded effort in Goliath to portray Israel in an extremely biased way in order to promote comparisons to Nazi Germany that would justify political campaigns aimed at eliminating the Jewish state qualifies even under the most stringent criteria" as being antisemitic.

In 2013, Rabbi Marvin Hier, founder of the Simon Wiesenthal Center, said that the center ranked Blumenthal in ninth place in their "Top Ten 2013 Anti-Semitic, Anti-Israel Slurs". Hier said that "we judge him by what he wrote. He crossed the line into outright anti-Semitism" and that "he quotes approvingly characterizations of Israeli soldiers as 'Judeo-Nazis'". Blumenthal responded by saying the Wiesenthal Center's list associated him with such people as American writer Alice Walker. He commented that he, Richard Falk, and Roger Waters (who also appear on the list) "had stiff competition: Ayatollah Khomeini [sic, Khamenei] was number one."

Responding on Twitter, Blumenthal posted a cartoon by Carlos Latuff, who had appeared on the list the previous year. Marquardt-Bigman reported that the cartoon depicted Hier as mad; Blumenthal has defended Latuff on Twitter. Gilad Atzmon praised Goliath on the Veterans Today website: "I really want Blumenthal's book to succeed and be read widely". He thought Blumenthal had "brilliantly though unwittingly managed to produce a pretty impressive journalistic account in support of my criticism of Jewish identity politics and tribal supremacy".

==== Russell Tribunal ====
Blumenthal appeared before the Russell Tribunal on Palestine on September 25, 2014, in Brussels, Belgium, to testify on allegations of war crimes and genocide by Israel against residents of the Gaza Strip during Operation Protective Edge. Blumenthal was in Gaza during Protective Edge and, according to Richard Falk in The Nation, provided an analysis of the "political design that appeared to explain the civilian targeting patterns". During his appearance at the Russell Tribunal, Blumenthal made a comparison between Israel and ISIL.

A few days later, Blumenthal and Rania Khalek created the Twitter hashtag #JSIL; "The Jewish State of Israel in the Levant", intended as a comparison between Israel and the Islamic State terrorist organization.

==== 2014 Berlin visit ====
Blumenthal and Canadian-Israeli journalist David Sheen were invited by Inge Höger and Annette Groth, members of The Left (Die Linke) party, to speak with them in the German parliament in Berlin, the Bundestag, with the meeting being scheduled for November 12, 2014. Blumenthal and Sheen stated that Höger and Groth's party colleague Gregor Gysi tried to cancel the meetings, because Gysi wished to dissociate the Left Party from anti-Israel campaigns.

Before the cancellation, Volker Beck of the Green Party described Blumenthal as someone who sought to "invoke consistently anti-Semitic comparisons between Israel and Nazism", Weinthal had presented his evidence about Blumenthal's writings and activism to Gysi.

Later, Blumenthal and Sheen waited for Gysi to discuss his claim they were antisemites, an assertion Gysi denied making. Gysi, followed by the two other parliamentary members, left his office and crossed down a corridor to enter a restroom, where Sheen and Blumenthal followed him, but failed to force their entry. The two MPs held their meeting with Sheen and Blumenthal in a non-party room, but cut all links with them after hearing about the incident with Gysi. Blumenthal and Sheen were banned from setting foot in the Bundestag again. In an e-mail explaining the ban, Bundestag president Norbert Lammert stated: "Every attempt to exert pressure on members of parliament, to physically threaten them and thus endanger the parliamentary process is intolerable and must be prevented".

==== The 51 Day War (2015) ====
In The 51 Day War (2015), Blumenthal writes that he was in Gaza during and following Operation Protective Edge, the 2014 Gaza War. Blumenthal said that the catalyst for the military offensive was the kidnapping and murder of three Israeli teenagers by a Hamas cell. He stated that Israel's West Bank operation was not aimed at rescuing the teens, who were known to be dead, or capturing their killers, but destroying a political agreement between Hamas and the Palestinian National Authority by targeting the Third Hamdallah Government. The book is based on his observations and interviews with citizens, physicians, and others. He writes that, during the operation, Israel targeted Palestinian civilians and media organizations, conducted execution-style killings and attacked refugee shelters.

According to Petra Marquardt-Bigman, Blumenthal testified at the Russell Tribunal that he arrived in Gaza "at the onset of a five-day humanitarian ceasefire on August 14". She said his interviews at the end of July indicated he was in Washington, D.C., which suggested he was probably elsewhere, rather than "on the ground", for the first few weeks of the war. She said a tweet by Blumenthal on August 22, indicated he had by then left the area. Marquardt-Bigman wrote that The 51 Day War was marketed as an "explosive work of reportage" and that Blumenthal "went to Gaza only some two weeks before the end of the fighting". Marquardt Bigman wrote that certain of his tweets show an "uncritical acceptance of the terror group's propaganda", a reference to Hamas. She said Blumenthal returned to Gaza to cover the "victory rallies" around the time Hamas accepted an indeterminate ceasefire.

Of the Battle of Shuja'iyya in July 2014 in 51 Days War, Blumenthal wrote of the Al-Qassam Brigades (the military wing of Hamas) who ambushed Israel Defense Forces soldiers, that although they "had not vanquished the vaunted Israeli Army", "they delivered a bloody nose to its most elite units." Sonali Kolhatkar wrote in the Los Angeles Review of Books that "Blumenthal's casting of the Al-Qassam Brigades as an army of resistance against a brutal aggressor is an essential transgression from the standard narrative of the Middle East conflict."

In a video recording of an event at the London School of Economics in March 2016, Blumenthal described the Al-Qassam commandos as having "burst into the [Nahal Oz] Israeli base and kill[ed] every soldier they encountered in hand-to-hand combat. [...] The message it sent to young Palestinians in the West Bank, in Jerusalem and abroad, was incredible ... You see your people in commando uniforms, bursting into a military base and showing up the occupier."

Kirkus Reviews described the book as being "Explosive, pull-no-punches reporting that is certain to stir controversy." The 51 Day War: Ruin and Resistance in Gaza was awarded a Palestine Book Award that year by the Middle East Monitor. Avi Benlolo CEO of the Simon Wiesenthal Center told The Canadian Jewish News in 2016: "While shunned by conventional media outlets, the book is popular on major anti-Semitic, neo-Nazi and conspiracy theory websites such as Stormfront and David Duke's Rense, where his work is used to promote anti-Jewish hate."

Blumenthal, an advocate of the Boycott, Divestment and Sanctions (BDS) campaign, was invited to speak about The 51 Day War at a Toronto PEN Canada event in February 2016. Blumenthal said: "What certain groups—which are very partisan right-wing groups affiliated with the Republican Party in the US and the Conservative Party here—decided to do is to declare me an anti-Semite, that I actually hate Jews." He explained: "However I decide to observe Judaism is irrelevant, because in their view, you can disagree all you want with Moses, but you can't disagree with King Bibi [Benjamin Netanyahu]."

==== Hillary Clinton and Elie Wiesel ====
At the beginning of February 2016, it became known via a release of emails from the State Department that, during Hillary Clinton's four years as Secretary of State, Sidney Blumenthal had sent her at least 19 articles by Max Blumenthal concerning Israel which she had distributed among her staff. In August 2010, Clinton emailed the elder Blumenthal to say: "Pls congratulate Max for another impressive piece. He's so good." Alan Dershowitz, also an associate of the Clintons, warned of the potential for problems over the connection with someone so critical of Israel.

When author and Holocaust survivor Elie Wiesel died in July 2016, Max Blumenthal tweeted that "Wiesel went from a victim of war crimes to a supporter of those who commit them", referring to Israel, and "did more harm than good and should not be honored". According to Blumenthal, Wiesel "repeatedly lauded Jewish settlers for ethnically cleansing Palestinians in East Jerusalem". Wiesel was criticized for supporting Elad, an Israeli group which encourages Jewish settlement in the area.

Subsequently, Jake Sullivan, then senior policy adviser for Hillary Clinton's presidential campaign, said: "Secretary Clinton emphatically rejects these offensive, hateful, and patently absurd statements about Elie Wiesel."

==== Gaza–Israel conflict ====
Killing Gaza, a feature-length documentary Blumenthal made with filmmaker Dan Cohen, was released in 2018. The work concerned the 2014 Gaza War, seen from the perspective of the residents of Gaza.

According to a 2019 article by Bruce Bawer in Commentary magazine, Blumenthal has published content critical of the Israel Defense Forces and favorable to Hamas in the Israeli–Palestinian conflict. He has been sharply critical of Israel's conduct in the Gaza war.

In November 2023, biology researcher Michal Perach wrote in Haaretz that Blumenthal had argued most Israelis were killed by Israeli soldiers during the October 7 attacks. Perach accused Blumenthal of manipulating sources by selectively cutting out inconvenient passages, editing, distorting and changing the meaning, and pushing details while obscuring the main facts.

Blumenthal tweeted in December 2023 that Israel was "inventing stories of mass rape on October 7." Haaretz journalist Sagi Cohen and Jewish Insider writer Gabby Deutch accused him of spreading conspiracy theories about October 7 attack.

In March 2024, Blumenthal attacked celebrity chef José Andrés for feeding Palestinians in Gaza because he used a jetty made with “genocidal biomatter.”

On January 16, 2025, Blumenthal interrupted US Secretary of State Antony Blinken's final press conference to ask him why he continued to arm Israel "when we had a deal in May".

=== Syria ===
In June 2012, Blumenthal resigned from the Lebanese newspaper, Al Akhbar, over what he considered its pro-Assad coverage. In an interview with The Real News Network shortly afterwards, Blumenthal was critical of Syrian president Bashar al-Assad, describing him as a dictator and saying that, "by all accounts", forces affiliated with Assad were responsible for the Houla massacre. Blumenthal also said that "the Assad regime was running an institution of torture in prisons" which made Israel look like "a champion of human rights".

In September 2013, Blumenthal reported for The Nation from the Zaatari refugee camp in Jordan on the conditions in which Syrian refugees were living. He wrote of being "staunchly against US strikes, mainly because I believe they could exacerbate an already horrific situation without altering the political reality in any meaningful way". However, he claimed "there was not one person I spoke to in Zaatari who did not demand US military intervention at the earliest possible moment."

After Blumenthal's visit to Moscow in December 2015, according to a 2018 article by Janine di Giovanni in The New York Review of Books, he began to promote views supportive of Bashar al-Assad and the Syrian government's position. Blumenthal was, di Giovanni wrote, among a group of "Assad apologists." Following the December 2015 trip, he said the White Helmets were connected to Al-Qaeda and anti-Assad Syrians were members of the group. In his opinion, the group was "driven by a pro-interventionist agenda conceived by the Western governments and public relations groups that back them" and were being used as a Trojan horse, an excuse for the United States to propose having "70,000 American servicemen" invade Syria.

In an article for New Politics, Charles Davis said that Blumenthal had implied in an October 2016 article that the White Helmets were involved in a "false flag conspiracy" to claim a UN convoy to rebel-held Aleppo had been bombed by the Syrian and Russian military. Davis wrote: "In fact, a White Helmet's member was among the first civilians to appear on camera at the scene of the attack, declaring in English that 'the regime helicopters targeted this place with four barrel [bombs]'." Blumenthal said the account provided by the White Helmets "remains unconfirmed by both the UN and SARC, and no evidence of barrel bombs has been produced". The UN later concluded their convoy had been hit by barrel bombs dropped by a Syrian regime helicopter.

Charles Davis stated that The Grayzone published an article by Blumenthal and Benjamin Norton which cast doubt on the Syrian government's responsibility for the 2017 Khan Shaykhun chemical attack. Blumenthal and Norton cited a report by Seymour Hersh which said sarin was not used in the attack. A week before their article was published, the Organisation for the Prohibition of Chemical Weapons confirmed the presence of sarin and a United Nations investigation later said the Syrian government was responsible.

Oz Katerji wrote in Haaretz in July 2017, that "[v]irtually any group that speaks out on the Assad regime's campaign of systematic slaughter have been targeted by this coterie", consisting of Blumenthal, Gareth Porter, Ben Norton and Rania Khalek "with the express intention of defending a regime guilty of human extermination." Far from being anti-war, they are "acting as full-time advocates for Russian and Iranian military imperialism in Syria and to provide them immunity in the American public square from war crimes charges." Gershom Gorenberg wrote on October 14, 2016, for The American Prospect that "Blumenthal's concern for Arab lives and rights seems to vanish once he locates the Assad regime as an opponent of American hegemony."

In separate articles, Charles Davis and Oz Katerji wrote that, in January 2017, following claims made by the Syrian government, Blumenthal blamed the contamination of the water supply for Damascus in the Wadi Barada valley on militants opposed to the government. A subsequent report by the UN found that "Syria's air force deliberately bombed water sources in December [2016], a war crime that cut off water [to] 5.5 million people in and around the capital Damascus." He tweeted in April 2018 that every time government forces "liberate" a rebel held area those opponents of Assad "allege a chemical attack."

Around the same time, Blumenthal told Sky News Australia that it was quite probable the Syrian rebels were responsible for the Douma chemical attack. "I cannot think of one pundit on the national scene, in cable news or in any major newspaper who has questioned the drive for regime change in Syria", he told Al Jazeera in an interview in June 2018. It is "left to a small group of journalists and online activists to really sift through what we believe is disinformation from our own governments aimed at stimulating a war of regime change."

In September 2019, Blumenthal was part of an American delegation which visited Damascus to participate in an Assad-backed trade union convention and to stand "against the economic blockade, imperialist interventions and terrorism." The Syrian government does not allow independent labor unions and strikes are illegal. Bellingcat wrote that recent visitors and a tour operator in Damascus had told it that Syria was not generally issuing travel visa to US citizens at the time Blumenthal visited. Muhammad Idrees Ahmad, writing for Al Jazeera, said the delegation included Rania Khalek, Paul Larudee of the Syrian Solidarity Movement, Ajamu Baraka, former RT producer Anya Parampil and "other pro-Assad conspiracy theorists". The delegation visited government-held areas and, according to Idrees Ahmad, were accompanied by a minder from the Assad government.

In 2019, Bellingcat wrote that Blumenthal was a recipient of the Serena Shim Award, a financial award for "uncompromised integrity in journalism" awarded by the Association for Investment in Popular Action Committees, which Bellingcat said was a non-profit group that supported Assad. Blumenthal, in a tweet, said he had not received money from "the 'Assad regime' or any lobbying group connected to it". Blumenthal challenged his critics assertions when he was interviewed by Rolling Stone in November 2019.

=== Nicaragua ===
In 2018, during the 2018–2022 Nicaraguan protests, Blumenthal wrote a "lengthy, insinuation-infused attack" on the journalist Carl David Goette-Luciak, a freelance reporter for The Guardian. The article, which was published by MintPress News and The Canary, stated that Goette-Luciak had links to the Nicaraguan opposition party Sandinista Renovation Movement (MRS) and to US organizations that supposedly fund the MRS to destabilise the government. Following an online harassment campaign, Luciak went into hiding. When he returned to his home, immigration officials arrested him and deported to El Salvador. Goette-Luciak said the officials threatened him with torture while he was in custody. A lawyer for Blumenthal told The Guardian "there was nothing to suggest [Blumenthal]'s reporting contributed to the deportation of Goette-Luciak."

=== Russia and Ukraine ===
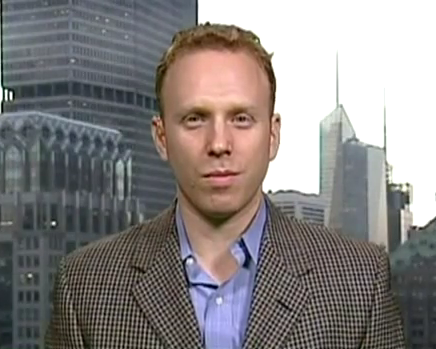
Blumenthal on RT America, December 2011

In November 2017, Blumenthal discussed the decision of the United States Department of Justice to classify RT as a "foreign agent" in an interview with Tucker Carlson on Fox News. He told Carlson: "I go on RT fairly regularly, and the reason I do so is because, while the three major cable networks are promoting bombing and sanctioning half the world, at least the non-compliant nations, RT is questioning that." Charles Davis, in an article for New Politics, stated in 2018 that Blumenthal is "found almost every week defending Russian foreign policy on platforms such as RT and Sputnik", and has defended Russia's role in the Syrian Civil War.

Blumenthal was skeptical of accounts of President Donald Trump and his administration colluding with Russia in the 2016 presidential election in an interview with Tucker Carlson. He said that establishment Republicans and progressive Democrats were using the Russia story to avoid "do[ing] anything progressive". Petra Marquardt-Bigman wrote that, in a December 2017 interview with Sputnik, Blumenthal had said "the Trump transition team colluded with a foreign power to subvert America's political system". She said he was referring to collusion with Israel, not Russia.

Peter Beinart wrote in The Atlantic that while Blumenthal and Glenn Greenwald have a strong dislike of President Donald Trump, they are more fundamentally against "hawkish" US foreign policy resulting in them minimizing "Russia's election meddling to oppose what they see as a new Cold War". Matt Taibbi in Rolling Stone cited Blumenthal among a group of journalists who had expressed what he described as "healthy" skepticism of Russiagate. Blumenthal described Russiagate, in an article for Truthdig, as a "vicious backlash ... against Trump's moves toward detente" with Russia. A 2018 article in the Ukrainian fact-checking organization StopFake described Blumenthal as a "pro-Russia American journalist" who "promotes Russian propaganda".

For his writing concerning Ukraine, Sławomir Sierakowski, the chief editor of the Polish left-wing magazine Krytyka Polityczna, included Blumenthal in a 2014 New York Times opinion piece entitled "Putin's Useful Idiots". Sierakowski discussed Blumenthal's statement that the "openly pro-Nazi politics" of the Ukrainian political party Svoboda and its leader, Oleg Tyagnibok, "have not deterred Senator John McCain from addressing a Euromaidan rally" and did not "prevent Assistant Secretary of State Victoria Nuland from enjoying a friendly meeting with the Svoboda leader this February". He said that Blumenthal's statement "distorts how these things work. A whole range of Western political leaders traveled to Euromaidan, and virtually all of them were photographed with Mr. Tyagnibok."

During the 2022 Russian invasion of Ukraine, Blumenthal falsely claimed the Mariupol theatre airstrike was the responsibility of Ukraine's Azov Regiment rather than Russian forces. In 2023, he was invited by Russia to address a UN Security Council briefing about arms supplies to Ukraine.

=== China ===
The Grayzone and Blumenthal have contested the scale of the detention of Uyghurs in Xinjiang re-education camps. "I don't have reason to doubt that there's something going in Xinjiang, that there could even be repression", he told Afshin Rattansi on RT UK's Going Underground in July 2020, adding "we haven't seen the evidence for these massive claims [of a million people detained]". He has asserted that the exaggeration or manufacture of crimes against humanity in Xinjiang are part of a United States government campaign to discredit China. In an email to Axios (which they quoted in an August 2020 article), he accused "Cold War ideologues" like the website, of "a desperate campaign to suppress [The Grayzone's] factual journalism." Representatives of the Chinese Foreign Ministry have approvingly tweeted links to The Grayzone articles on this issue.

=== The Management of Savagery (2019) ===
Blumenthal's book The Management of Savagery: How America's National Security State Fueled the Rise of Al Qaeda, ISIS, and Donald Trump was published in 2019 by Verso Books.

Lydia Wilson, in a review for The Times Literary Supplement, was critical of The Management of Savagery. She wrote that Blumenthal overstates his case "with misleading or one-sided examples" in an account of the United States involvement in wars during the previous two decades which "tips sufficiently and with enough regularity into full-scale conspiracy to allow any careful reader to dismiss it." Wilson commented that Blumenthal "uses long-debunked myths", originating from Russian and Syrian sources, to explain the Ghouta chemical attack in 2013.

Journalist Chris Hedges, in a positive review for Truthdig, described the book as "insightful". A review by Nasser Baston in the British newspaper Morning Star stated that it is a "useful antidote to the torrents of pro-empire bilge promoted by conservatives and liberals alike".

=== Venezuela (2019) ===
On February 24, 2019, Blumenthal posted an article on The Grayzone website about clashes on February 23 on the Colombia–Venezuela border during the 2019 Venezuelan presidential crisis and the shipping of humanitarian aid to Venezuela. The US government and media had stated that humanitarian aid trucks that were attempting to enter Venezuela from Colombia had been deliberately set on fire by Nicolas Maduro's forces. In his article, Blumenthal wrote that "the claim was absurd on its face". He said footage from Bloomberg News showed that opposition protesters on the Francisco de Paula Santander bridge in the border were preparing Molotov cocktails, "which could easily set a truck cabin or its cargo alight". He referred to having seen similar situations during his reporting on the West Bank. According to Glenn Greenwald in The Intercept, "[Blumenthal] compiled substantial evidence strongly suggesting that the trucks were set ablaze by anti-Maduro protesters".

In August, Blumenthal interviewed Maduro.

On October 25, 2019, Blumenthal was arrested and charged with assault of a woman in a case related to a May 7 incident at the embassy of Venezuela, Washington, D.C. The US Department of Justice dropped the case against Blumenthal in December 2019.

In May 2020, Blumenthal said on The Jimmy Dore Show that George Soros is funding anti-government protesters in Venezuela, as well as in Hong Kong.

=== Twitter hacked materials warning label ===
In February 2021, tweets concerning a Grayzone article by Blumenthal were the first to receive a Twitter warning label stating: "These materials may have been obtained through hacking". The story was entitled "Reuters, BBC, and Bellingcat participated in covert UK Foreign Office-funded programs to 'weaken Russia', leaked docs reveal". The story referred to hacked and leaked documents which, it alleged, show a British Army unit has used "social media to help fight wars". Twitter's head of editorial in Europe, the Middle East, and Africa is a reservist for the same British Army Unit.

== Bibliography ==
- (2009): Republican Gomorrah: Inside the Movement that Shattered the Party New York. Nation Books; ISBN 978-1568583983
- (2013): Goliath: Life and Loathing in Greater Israel. New York: Nation Books; ISBN 978-1568586342
- (2015): The 51 Day War: Ruin and Resistance in Gaza. New York: Nation Books; ISBN 978-1568585116
- (2019): The Management of Savagery: How America's National Security State Fueled the Rise of Al Qaeda, ISIS, and Donald Trump. London/New York: Verso Books; ISBN 9781788732284

== Awards ==
- Online News Association's Independent Feature Award for his 2002 article, "Day of the Dead", published in Salon.
- 2014 Lannan Foundation Cultural Freedom Award for An Especially Notable Book for Goliath: Life and Loathing in Greater Israel (2013).
- Palestine Book Award (2015) by the Middle East Monitor for The 51 Day War: Ruin and Resistance in Gaza (2015).
