= Al Akhbar (Lebanon) =

Daily newspaper in Lebanon

- Type: Daily newspaper
- Format: Semi-tabloid
- Publisher: Akhbar Beirut
- Editor-in-chief: Ibrahim Al Amin
- Founded: 2006
- Political alignment: Secularism; Feminism; LGBTQ rights; Anti-neoliberalism; Anti-imperialism; Anti-Zionism; Anti-Americanism; Pro-Palestinianism; Pro-Hezbollah
- Language: Arabic
- Headquarters: Rue Verdun, Beirut
- Website: al-akhbar.com (in Arabic); en.al-akhbar.com (in English)

Al Akhbar (Arabic: الأخبار, romanized: al-ʾAkhbār, lit. 'The News') is a daily Arabic language newspaper published in a semi tabloid format in Beirut. The newspaper's writers have included Ibrahim Al Amine, As'ad AbuKhalil, Amal Saad-Ghorayeb, Sinan Antoon, Hicham Safieddine, Pierre Abi Saab, Sharmine Narwani, and Amer Mohsen.

It is generally considered to be supportive of Hezbollah and opposes the regional policies of Saudi Arabia, the United States, and the Lebanese March 14 Political Alliance. Journalist Robert Worth from the New York Times described it as "most dynamic and daring in Lebanon, and perhaps anywhere in the Arab world"—one that is independent, feminist, secular, and an advocate for LGBT rights, and generally pro-Hezbollah, though it also feels free to criticize the movement.

Al Akhbar's English-language section was temporarily discontinued on 6 March 2015, in part due to a lack of funds. In May 2025, the newspaper made an announcement that it had relaunched its English section.

== History and profile ==
The newspaper began to be published and distributed in 2006, and is registered with the same license of the paper of the same name, established in 1953, owned by Akhbar Beirut S.A.L. (News of Beirut). It was established by the late Joseph Samaha (a leftist intellectual and former editor-in-chief of As-Safir) and Ibrahim Al Amin (also a leftist journalist and political analyst). A 2009 survey by Ipsos Stat established that the daily is among the five most popular newspapers in Beirut.

In December 2010, Al Akhbar received and published an advance copy of the US State Department cables leak, after which the newspaper's website was hacked. Following this attack, the paper shut down its website for a while. It has since continued to partner with WikiLeaks, and translate Arabic cables. The paper's online version was the 12th most visited website for 2010 in the MENA region.

On 18 July 2011 the paper together with As Safir, another daily published in Lebanon, was banned in Syria.

== Orientation ==
Al Akhbar declares its political orientation as independent and progressive, supporting movements working for independence, freedom, and social justice, and against war and occupation, in Lebanon and around the world. The social justice commitment includes publication of articles and columns advancing women's and gay rights. In his "Comprehensive Guide to Lebanese Media," journalist Deen Sharp describes Al Akhbar as "critical of all Lebanese groups," but "perceived as pro-March 8th," a coalition of political parties in Lebanon that includes Hezbollah and the Free Patriotic Movement.

In 2010, Ibrahim Al Amine, editorial chairman of Al Akhbar, described the founding ambitions of the newspaper: "We wanted the U.S. ambassador to wake up in the morning, read it and get upset.” Responding in a letter to The New York Times, Jeffrey Feltman, who was US ambassador to Lebanon when Al Amine made the remark, wrote that Al Amine "did get my attention, but not in the way he intended. The hilariously erroneous accounts of my activities reported as fact in his newspaper provoked morning belly laughs." Later, in 2013, Al Amine attacked the U.S. as "the main source of policies of oppression, hegemony, and injustice in the world."

Marwan Hamadeh, a member of the 14 March Alliance and a deputy in Lebanon's legislature, and news reports in publications such as The New York Times and Wall Street Journal have described Al Akhbar as pro-Hezbollah. Former US ambassador Feltman wrote in early 2011 that Al Akhbar romanticized and never criticized Hezbollah leader Hassan Nasrallah. Robert Worth, in The New York Times, wrote in 2010 that the paper "has sometimes criticized Hezbollah in print (though mildly)." In his 2012 and 2013 Al Akhbar English language columns, writer As'ad AbuKhalil, despite his generally pro-March 8th views, criticized both Hezbollah and its leader Hassan Nasrallah. In 2025, AbuKhalil began writing a weekly column titled A Critical Retrospective on Hezbollah's Political and Military Experience, intended to be a constructive criticism of what he perceives as errors and missteps committed by Hezbollah. In one edition, among other things, he criticizes Hezbollah for its 2023 cultural campaign against homosexuality, calling it counterproductive and misguided.

New York Times journalist Mark Ashurst described the newspaper as having "close links to the government" of President Bashar al-Assad of Syria." A reporter for the same newspaper, Robert Worth in 2010, wrote that Al Akhbar newspaper "has become the most dynamic and daring in Lebanon, and perhaps anywhere in the Arab world," but criticized the publication for "news pages that often show a loose mingling of fact, rumor and opinion."

== Controversies ==
=== Murder of Amal Khalil ===
The journalist Amal Khalil was killed in an Israeli strike on April 22, 2026, during the Israel–Lebanon war, despite the ceasefire. Her colleague, Zeinab Faraj, was seriously injured in the same strike. According to separate investigations by Amnesty International and Human Rights Watch, the Israeli military was aware that both women were journalists but nevertheless chose to target them, and both organizations concluded that the strike constituted a war crime. Human Rights Watch also accused the Israeli military of obstructing rescue operations, including by throwing a stun grenade toward emergency responders.

=== Max Blumenthal's resignation ===
Max Blumenthal joined Al Akhbar in late 2011 primarily to write about Israel-Palestine issues and foreign-policy debates in Washington.

Blumenthal left Al Akhbar in June 2012 in protest at Al Akhbar's coverage of the Syrian Civil War. In an interview with The Real News he said that "It was too much to have my name and reputation associated with open Assad apologists when the scale of atrocities had become so extreme and when the editor-in-chief of Al-Akhbar was offering friendly advice to Bashar al-Assad on the website of Al-Akhbar, you know, painting him as this kind of genuine, earnest reformer who just needed to get rid of the bad men around him and cut out some of the rich oligarchs who happened to be his cousins, and then everything would be fine. That was ridiculous." Blumenthal also highlighted editorials by Amal Saad-Ghorayeb and Sharmine Narwani. Blumenthal said that Al Akhbar had seen "a major exodus of key staffers at Al-Akhbar over the Syrian issue. ... the conflict over Syria has divided the Lebanese left. And so the debates at Al-Akhbar really reflected the debates inside the Lebanese left. And what it came to [pass] this spring, apparently, was that the pro-Assad faction, which saw him and his regime as an anti-imperialist bulwark, had more or less won out, although some dissident voices remain." Blumenthal said it "gave me more latitude than any paper in the United States to write about" the Israeli–Palestinian conflict, He added Al Akhbar "still remains, in some respects, a valuable publication on a lot of issues, like, for example, the abuse of domestic workers inside Lebanon, which is a plague and very few other publications report on" the issue.

Blumenthal has since changed his position on Syria and apologized to Sharmine Narwani and other editors he had criticized in 2012.

=== Special Tribunal for Lebanon ===
On 31 January 2014, the Special Tribunal for Lebanon for the assassination of the Lebanese Prime Minister Rafic Hariri, located in the Netherlands, indicted the newspaper and its editor Ibrahim Mohamed Al Amin, ordering them to answer various charges in front of the court, on charges of contempt of the court and obstruction of justice after the newspaper published two articles pretending to reveal confidential information on protected witnesses. The newspaper was fined €6,000 Al Amin completed sentence of a €20,000 fine against him on 14 August 2014. Both fines were for contempt of court.
