= Dan Cohen (journalist) =

American author, journalist and blogger

- Born: 1984 or 1985 (age 40–41); Phoenix, Arizona, U.S.
- Occupations: Journalist; Filmmaker; Writer
- Children: 1

Dan Cohen (born 1984 or 1985) is an American journalist and filmmaker based in Washington, D.C. Formerly of RT America, Cohen has contributed to Al Jazeera English, Alternet, Electronic Intifada, The Grayzone, Middle East Eye, Mondoweiss, The Nation, and Vice News and MintPress News.

Cohen is Jewish. He is from Phoenix, Arizona, and has one child. His family were Lithuanian Jews from Lazdijai, Lithuania. His family members in Lithuania were exterminated by the Nazis during the Holocaust, and the occupation of Lithuania following Operation Barbarossa.

== Works ==
- Killing Gaza. with Max Blumenthal. 2018.
