= Joseph Samaha =

- Born: Joseph Nasri Samaha; 1949
- Died: 2007 (aged 57–58)
- Education: Lebanese University
- Occupation: journalist

Joseph Samaha (1949–2007) (Arabic: جوزيف نصري سماحة) was a Lebanese journalist and leftwing intellectual. He was editor-in-chief of the Lebanese newspaper As-Safir and a cofounder of the newspaper Al Akhbar.

== Life ==
Samaha was born in 1949 in Khenchara, a village in Lebanon. When he was four years old, after his father's death, he moved with his mother and younger brother to the town of Beino in the Akkar District.

His mother worked hard and Samaha was able to attend the Freire Catholic School in Beirut, where he finished his secondary education despite the family's poverty. He then studied at the Lebanese University, gaining a bachelor's degrees in philosophy in 1972.

While studying at the Faculty of Arts in Beirut, Samaha joined the Arab Revolutionary Workers Party before joining the Communist Action Organization in Lebanon in 1972, after a dispute with Yasin al-Hafiz over the position to take on the Palestinian resistance, . While a member of the Communist Action Organization, he joined the editorial family of the weekly Al-Hurriya magazine, his first experience as editor in chief of a press publication. From 1974 to 1978 he also worked for the Lebanese daily As-Safir newspaper. In 1978 he moved to be editor in chief of Al Watan newspaper, representing the Lebanese National Movement (LNM). In 1980 he left Al Watan, writing again for As-Safir from 1980 until 1984.

Samaha obtained the advanced Diploma in Political science in Paris in 1981, and then returned to Lebanon. In 1984 he left again for France to complete his university studies, but was soon seduced by the press. In Paris, he worked as editor in chief of Youm7 magazine, which supported the Palestine Liberation Organization, along with the Palestinian writer Bilal Al Hassan. This was his longest journalistic experience, as he remained at Youm7 until 1991. He also had a short journalistic experience with Fawwaz Traboulsi at Zawaya magazine, founded and directed in Paris by Emile Menhem, who later accompanied Samaha to the Al Akhbar newspaper in Lebanon. Zawaya magazine had a cultural focus, introducing Occidentalism, how Easterners see the West, as an alternative to criticizing Orientalism. Other areas of coverage included women's issues, photography, visual culture, and popular culture. The magazine sought to be independent of external fundraising, which led to the end of the experiment before the release of the fourth issue devoted to Arab women's issues.

Samaha joined Al-Hayat newspaper in 1992, rising to become deputy editor in chief. He moved to be managing editor in chief at As-Safir newspaper from 1995 until 1998, when he returned to Al-Hayat. He headed the department of politics in London before moving to Lebanon in 2000 as director of Al-Hayat's Beirut office. Samaha returned to As-Safir newspaper in 2001 as editor in chief before leaving it for the last time to establish the Lebanese newspaper Al-Akhbar, whose first issue was published prematurely in August 2006 during the Israeli aggression on Lebanon.

His experience with Al-Akhbar newspaper did not last long. Samaha died of a heart attack during a trip to London, when he went to pay his respects to Hazem Sagieh on the loss of his wife, Mai Ghoussoub.

== Literature ==
- Passing the Peace: Towards an Arab Solution to the Jewish Question (Arabic: salam eabir: nahw hal earabi lilmas'alat alyahudia), 1993.
- Decree No Destiny: On the Ethics of the Second Republic (Arabic: qada' la qadra: fi 'akhlaq aljumhuria althaania), 1996.
