= As-Safir =

Defunct Lebanese newspaper (1974–2016)

As-Safir السفير

- As-Safir front page, 16 April 2013
- Type: Daily newspaper
- Format: Broadsheet
- Publisher: Dar Al Safir
- Editor: Talal Salman
- Founded: 26 March 1974
- Ceased publication: 31 December 2016
- Political alignment: Arab nationalism Pan-Arabism; Anti-Zionism; Anti-imperialism; Pro-March 8 Alliance
- Language: Arabic
- Headquarters: Beirut, Lebanon
- Website: www.assafir.com

As-Safir (Arabic: السفير, lit. 'The Ambassador') was a leading Arabic-language daily newspaper in Lebanon. The headquarters of the daily was in Beirut. It was in circulation from March 1974 until December 2016. The last issue of the paper was published on 31 December 2016. The online version was also closed on the same date.

Aimed at political coverage, As-Safir dubbed itself the "Voice of the Voiceless", serving as a key news source for Lebanese in the Arab world. It espoused Arab nationalism and supported the Palestinians, aligning with the March 8 Alliance. Its rival an-Nahar is associated with the March 14 alliance.

== History and profile ==
As-Safir was first published by Talal Salman on 26 March 1974 as an Arabic political daily. Talal Salman also served as chief editor of the paper. Bassem Sabeh was the chief editor of the paper between 1980 and 1990. In 2005, the daily's chief editor was Joseph Samaha. The publisher of the daily which was published in broadsheet format was Dar Al Safir.

One of the early contributors was Palestinian cartoonist Naji Al Ali. Another contributor was Samir Frangieh.

On 18 July 2011, the paper, together with Al Akhbar, another daily published in Lebanon, was banned in Syria.

As-Safir had a weekly page on the environmental issues.

== Political approach ==
As-Safir stated its mission as to be "the newspaper of Lebanon in the Arab world and the newspaper of the Arab world in Lebanon." This remained the slogan printed on the paper's masthead. It also adopted the slogan "The voice of voiceless". The paper provided an independent voice for the left-wing, Pan-Arab tendency which was increasingly active in Lebanese intellectual and political life in the years after the Arab defeat in the Six-Day War. It also focused on issues pertaining to the Muslim world, advocated Arab nationalism, was close to Hezbollah and had a pro-Syrian stance.

Another Lebanese daily, An-Nahar, was cited as the biggest rival of As-Safir. In the mid-1990s, the paper was described as a left-of-center paper, whereas An-Nahar as a right-of-center paper. During the same period, As-Safir was also described by Robert Fisk as a Syrian-backed newspaper. In the 2000s these papers were supporters of two opposite poles in Lebanon, in that An-Nahar supported March 14 alliance, whereas As-Safir supported March 8 alliance.

== Circulation and websites ==
As-Safir had the second highest circulation in Lebanon in the 1990s after An-Nahar. Its circulation was 45,000 copies in 2003, making it the second best selling paper in Lebanon. The paper sold more than 50,000 copies in 2010. In 2012, the Lebanese Ministry of Information reported that the daily had a circulation of 50,000 copies. The circulation of the paper was less than 10,000 copies in 2016 when it folded.

In addition to its Arabic website, the paper had also an English website. The paper's online version was the 16th most visited website for 2010 in the MENA region.

== See also ==
- List of newspapers in Lebanon
