= Francisco de Paula Santander International Bridge =

Francisco de Paula Santander International Bridge Spanish: Puente Internacional Francisco de Paula Santander
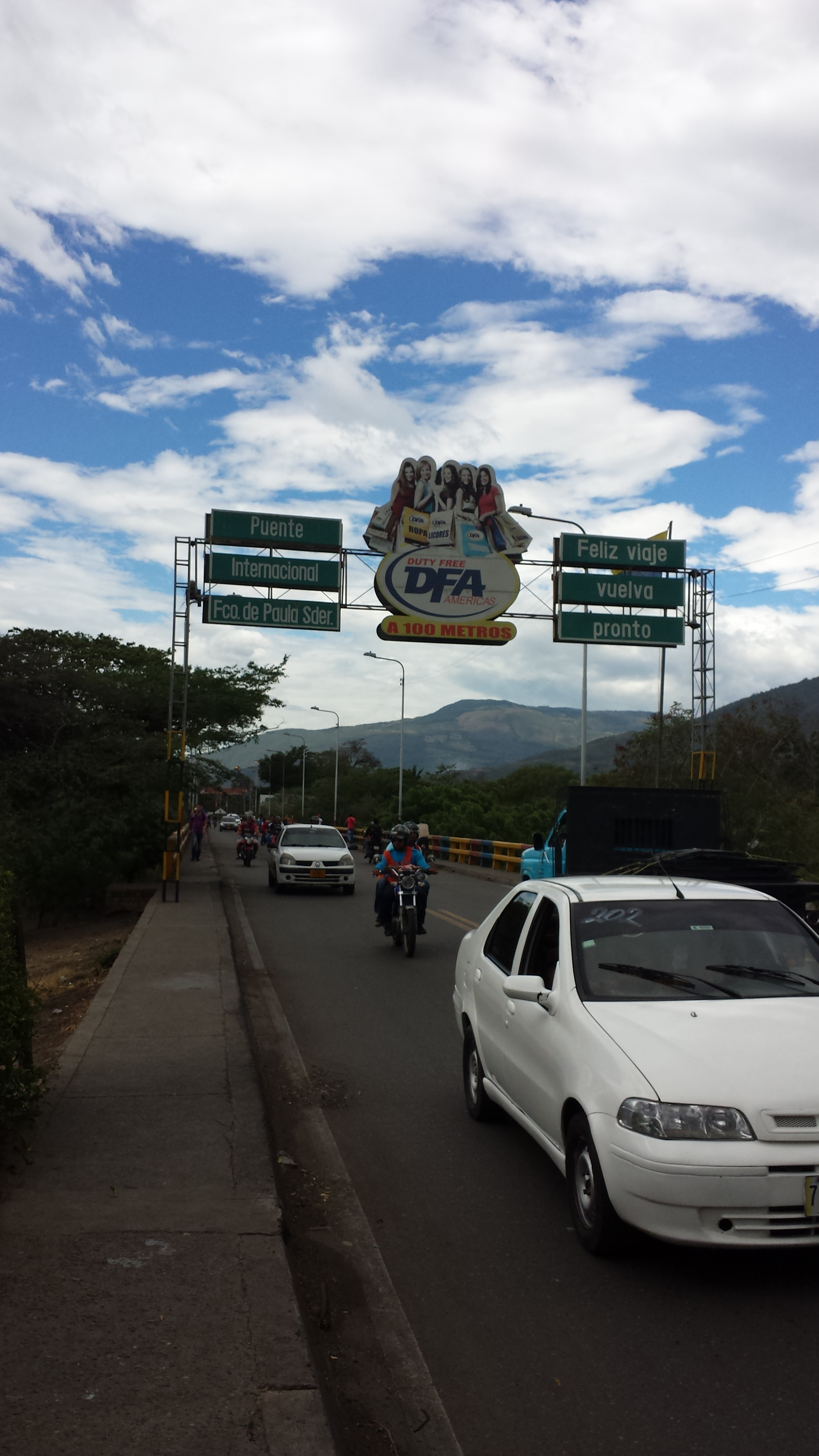
- Bridge in Cúcuta
- Coordinates: 7.9163°N 72.4628°W
- Crosses: Táchira River
- Named for: Francisco de Paula Santander

Characteristics
- Total length: 210 m
- Width: 7.3 m
- Height: 10 m

Location
- Interactive map of Francisco de Paula Santander International Bridge

The Francisco de Paula Santander International Bridge (Spanish: Puente internacional Francisco de Paula Santander) is a road bridge connecting Colombia with Venezuela across the Táchira River. One of five bridges across the border between the two countries, it is about 210 meters long, with two lanes of traffic and a width of 7.3 meters.

It connects Cúcuta in North Santander, Colombia and Ureña in Táchira, Venezuela. It is named after Francisco de Paula Santander.

In 2019 the bridge was physically blocked by the Venezuelan Army.

== See also ==
- Simón Bolívar International Bridge
- Tienditas Bridge
