= Amal Saad-Ghorayeb =

Lebanese writer and political analyst

Amal Abdo Saad-Ghorayeb (Arabic: أمل سعد غريب) is a Lebanese writer and political analyst known for her writings on the Israeli–Lebanese conflict and Hezbollah.

== Life ==
Saad-Ghorayeb was an assistant professor of political science at the Lebanese American University until 2008. She received her Ph.D. from the University of Birmingham, England. She was a visiting scholar at the Carnegie Middle East Center (CMEC). While discussing the 2006 Lebanon War, Noam Chomsky cited her as "the leading Lebanese academic scholar of Hezbollah". In 2009, she declined an invitation to speak at the NATO Defense College, because this would have involved talking to Israeli military officers, which is against Lebanese law.

Her articles have appeared in openDemocracy, The Guardian, Foreign Affairs, The Washington Post, and Lebanon's Al Akhbar.

Her father, Abdo Saad, is a Shiite pollster; her mother is Christian.

As of 2026, she is working as a lecturer at Cardiff University.

== Publications ==
- Hezbollah: Politics and Religion. London: Pluto Press. 2001, ISBN 978-0-7453-1793-9
- The Iran Connection: Understanding the Alliance with Syria, Hizbullah and Hamas, I. B. Tauris & Company, Limited, 2011
