= Goliath: Life and Loathing in Greater Israel =

2013 book by Max Blumenthal

- Publisher: Public Affairs
- Publication date: October 2013
- ISBN: 9781568586342

Goliath: Life and Loathing in Greater Israel is a 2013 book by Max Blumenthal. The book examines what Blumenthal characterizes as Israel's aggressive shift to the far-right, and its crackdown on local activism. In the preface, Blumenthal says that "Americans' tax dollars and political support are crucial in sustaining the present state of affairs" in Israel.

== Reception ==
=== Reviews ===
The book received a positive review by Nancy Murray in the academic journal Race & Class, calling it "a work of unsettling but scrupulous and courageous truth-telling". It was also positively reviewed in the Journal of Palestine Studies by Steven Salaita, who called it "one of the most important titles published on the Israel-Palestine conflict in the past few years".

Eric Alterman, writing in The Nation, said "Goliath is a propaganda tract...this book could have been published by the Hamas Book-of-the-Month Club (if it existed)". Blumenthal responded in another issue of the magazine, saying that the Alterman review was a smear, loaded with inaccuracies that are refuted by several authors. He defended his comparison of Israeli actions with those of Nazi Germany. Alterman wrote a total of nine critical pieces on Goliath.

The book was criticized by J.J. Goldberg in an opinion piece in The Forward, saying it was biased against Israel, and pointing to errors in spelling. Petra Marquardt-Bigman in The Jerusalem Post criticized how the book compares the Israeli state to Nazi Germany, calling it a form of "bigotry".

Publishers Weekly wrote that the book is "a blunt look at a country where citizens are clearly divided into the "haves" and the "have nots"."

Nina Burleigh, writing for The New York Observer, stated that the book is "a journalist's view of the country" that "balances" against the pro-Israel view promoted by the country's government that was "especially insightful" about left-wing, pro-Palestinian Israelis, although she felt the book was not being harsh enough on Islamist figures, calling the treatment "naive".

James Fallows, the former chief speechwriter to U.S. president Jimmy Carter, wrote in The Atlantic that Goliath "is no more 'anti-Israel', let alone anti-Semitic, than The Shame of the Cities, The Jungle, and The Grapes of Wrath were anti-American for pointing out "extremes and abuses in American society." Glenn Greenwald described the book as "eye-opening and stunningly insightful", and Charles Glass wrote that "anyone who thinks he knows what is happening in Israel and its occupied territories will think again after reading this great work". Jim Miles, in his review in Foreign Policy, described it as "a powerful and distressing book for a view on what life in modern Israel is like." Kirkus Reviews described it as "A rich, roiling examination" of the country, while John Hudson in Foreign Policy described the book as an "indictment of Israel's treatment of Palestinians".

=== Awards ===
Goliath was awarded the 2014 Lannan Cultural Freedom Award for An Especially Notable Book.
