= Bnei Brak (disambiguation) =

Bnei Brak, or variants, is the name of several places:

- Beneberak, a Biblical city
- Bnei Brak, a modern city in Israel, located 4 kilometers north of its Biblical counterpart
- Al-Khayriyya, or Ibn Ibraq, a former Palestinian Arab village once known as Beneberak
