= Kafr 'Ana =

Kafr 'Ana كفرعانة Kafar Ana
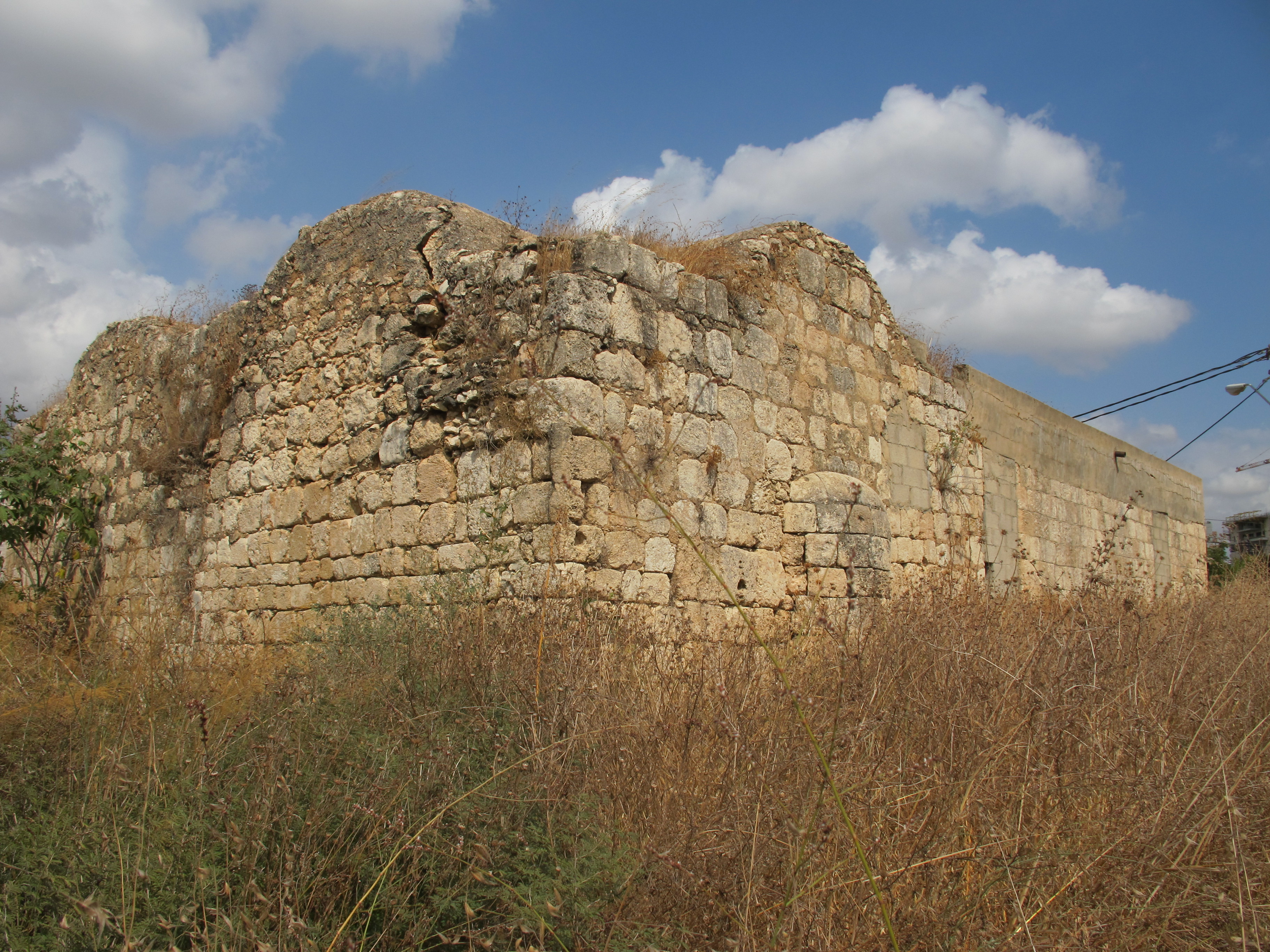
- Ruins of the mosque of Kafr 'Ana
- Etymology: The village of Ana
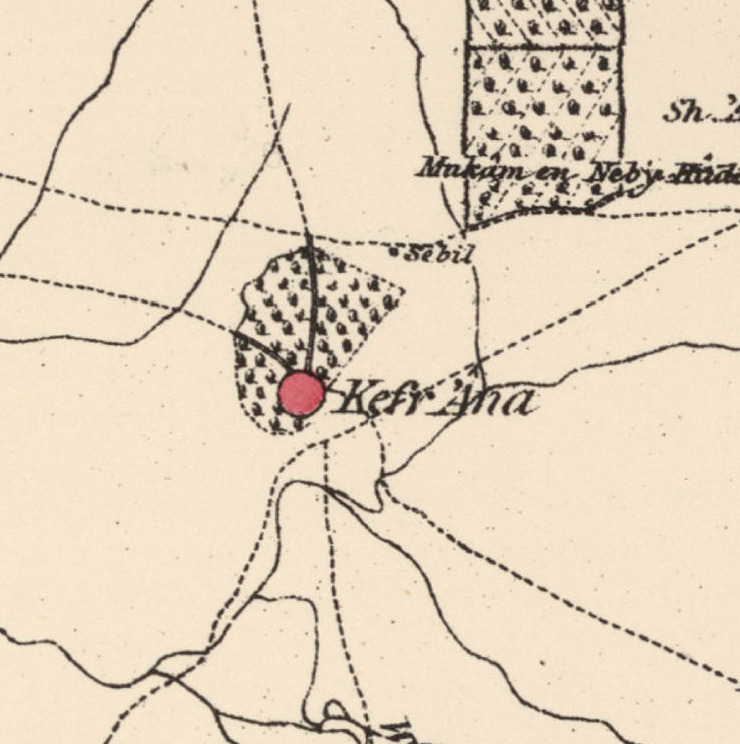
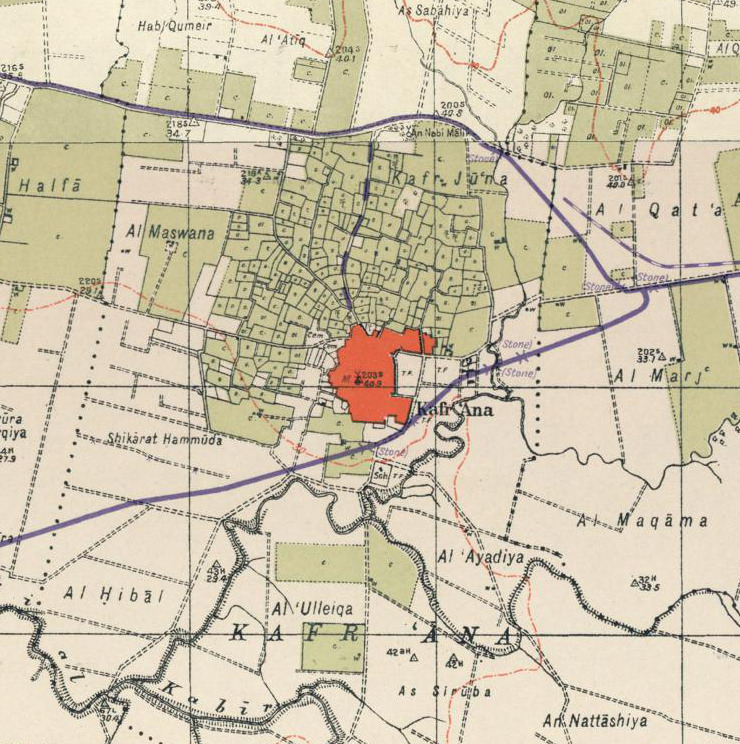
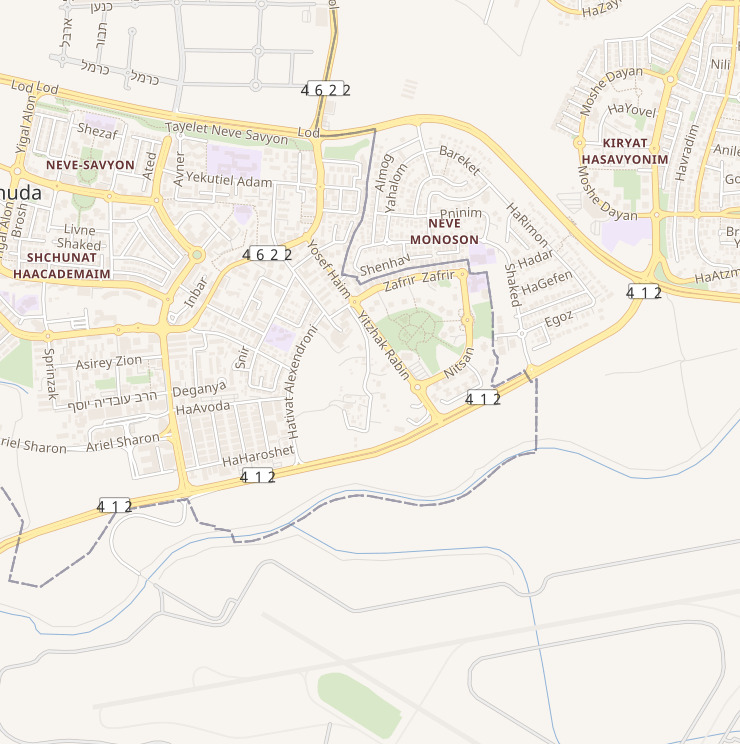
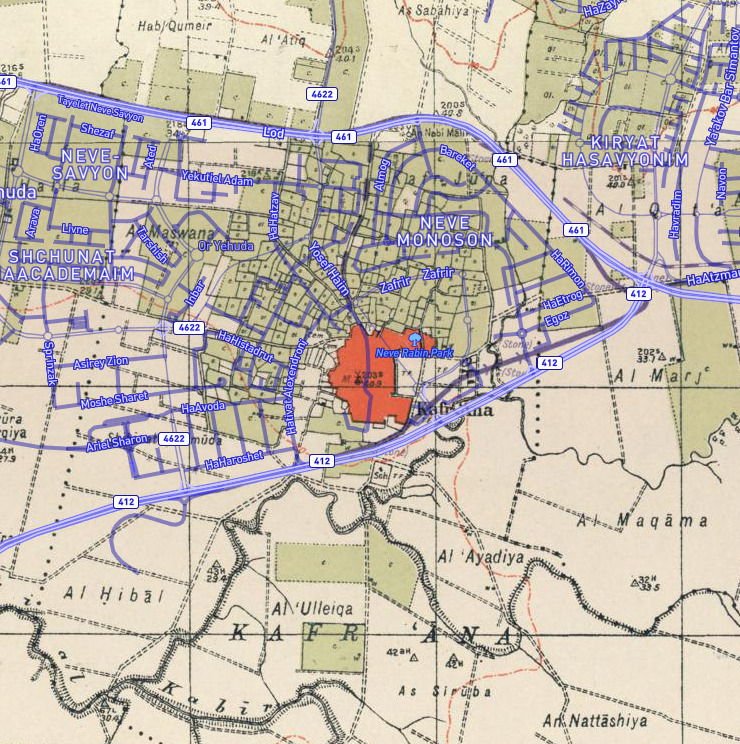
- 1870s map 1940s map modern map 1940s with modern overlay map A series of historical maps of the area around Kafr 'Ana (click the buttons)

- Location within Mandatory Palestine
- Coordinates: 32°1′28″N 34°52′7″E
- Palestine grid: 137/159
- Geopolitical entity: Mandatory Palestine
- Subdistrict: Jaffa
- Date of depopulation: April 25, 1948

Area
  - Total: 17,553 dunams (17.553 km^{2}; 6.777 sq mi)

Population (1945)
  - Total: 3,020
- Cause(s) of depopulation: Military assault by Yishuv forces
- Current Localities: Neve Monosson Yagel Or Yehuda

Kafr 'Ana (Arabic: كفرعانة, also: Kofr Ana) was a Palestinian town located 11 kilometers (6.8 mi) east of Jaffa, built on the ancient site of Ono. In 1945, the town had an estimated population of 2,800 Arabs and 220 Jews. The village was captured by the Haganah in April during the 1948 Palestine war. A number of Palestinian villagers were killed and the rest fled or were expelled, whereafter the village was destroyed. Today, the old village site lies within the modern Israeli city of Or Yehuda.

== History ==
Remains from the Chalcolithic Period and forward have been found here. The Canaanites and Israelites referred to the town as Ono (1 Chronicles 8:12), which name continued all throughout the First and Second Temple periods. In Aramaic, the name means “The village of the sheep”.

=== Byzantine period ===
Jewish classical writings mention the city as being formerly enclosed by a wall. Kafr 'Ana was known as Onous in the Byzantine Empire era, and ceramics from that era have been found here. Kafr 'Ana actually represents a Byzantine-period expansion of a nearby and much older site –– Kafr Juna, believed to be the ancient Ono.

=== Ottoman period ===
During early Ottoman rule in Palestine, the revenues of the village of Kafr 'Ana were in 1552 designated for the new waqf of Hasseki Sultan Imaret in Jerusalem, established by Hasseki Hurrem Sultan (Roxelana), the wife of Suleiman the Magnificent.

In 1596, Kafr 'Ana appeared in the census located in the Nahiya of Ramla, part of Gaza Sanjak. The population was 11 households, all Muslim. They paid a fixed tax-rate of 25% on agricultural products, including wheat, barley, summer crops, vineyards, fruit trees, sesame, goats and beehives; in addition to occasional revenues, a total of 26,800 akçe. All of the revenue went to a waqf.

In the 18th century, Kafr 'Ana absorbed the population of the village of Subtara, abandoned under nomadic pressures, which was the largest village in the neighbourhood.

In 1838, Kefr 'Âna was noted as a Muslim village in the Lydda District.

French explorer Victor Guérin visited the village in 1863 and found it to have 500 inhabitants. He further noted that "near the village are two shallow basins hollowed in rock, not built up, which receive the winter rains. Several wells are here as well, which permit the gardens to be irrigated. By the side of one of these wells I observed trunks of columns which seemed ancient."

An Ottoman village list of about 1870 counted 156 houses and a population of 499, though the population count included only men.

In 1882, the PEF's Survey of Western Palestine described Kafr 'Ana as a village built of adobe bricks and surrounded by palm trees.

=== British Mandate period ===
In the 1922 census of Palestine conducted by the British Mandate authorities, Kufr 'Ana had a population of 1,374 inhabitants, all Muslims. In the 1931 census the population was found to have increased to 1,824, and was still all Muslims, who lived in a total of 449 houses.

The villagers grew crops and raised poultry and bees. In the 1944/45 statistics a total 2,214 dunums were used for growing citrus and bananas, while 11,022 dunums of village land were used for cereals. 597 dunums were irrigated or used for orchards, while 90 dunams were classified as built-up areas.

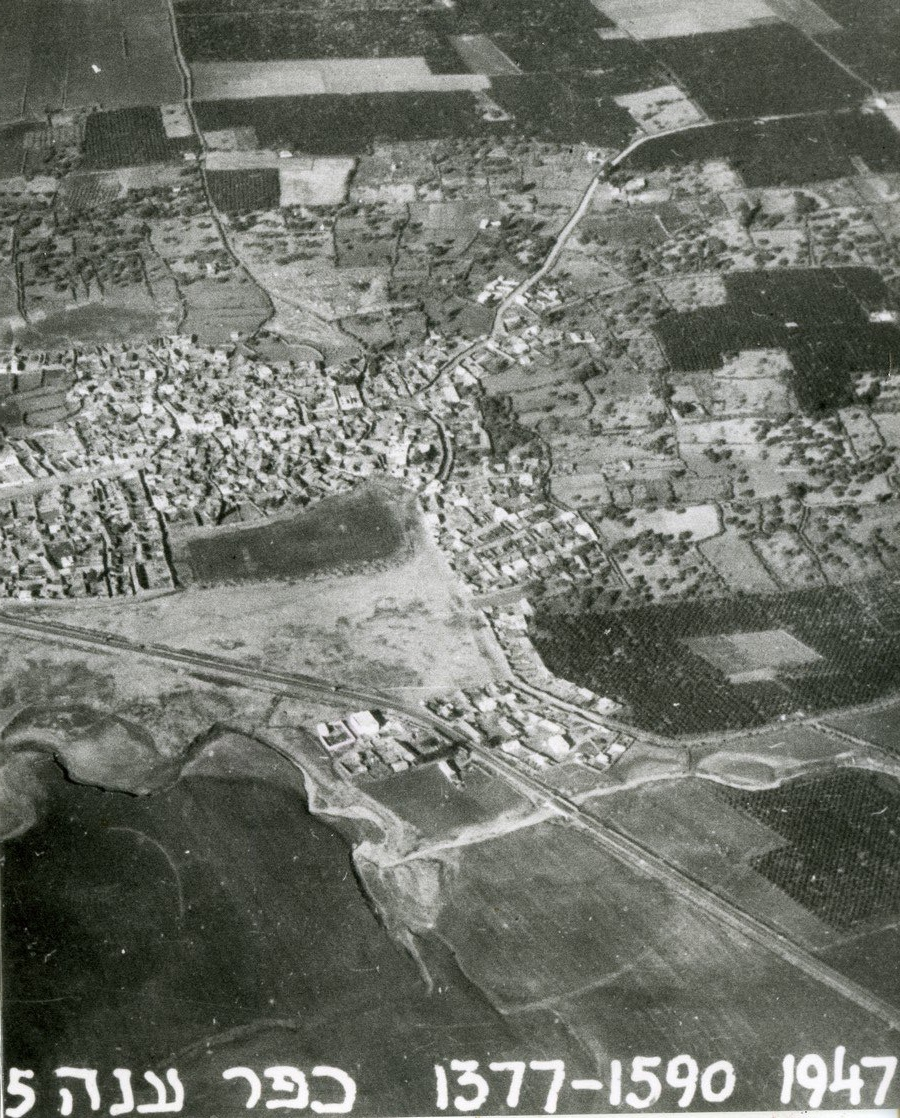
Kafr ‘Ana 1947 from Palmach archive

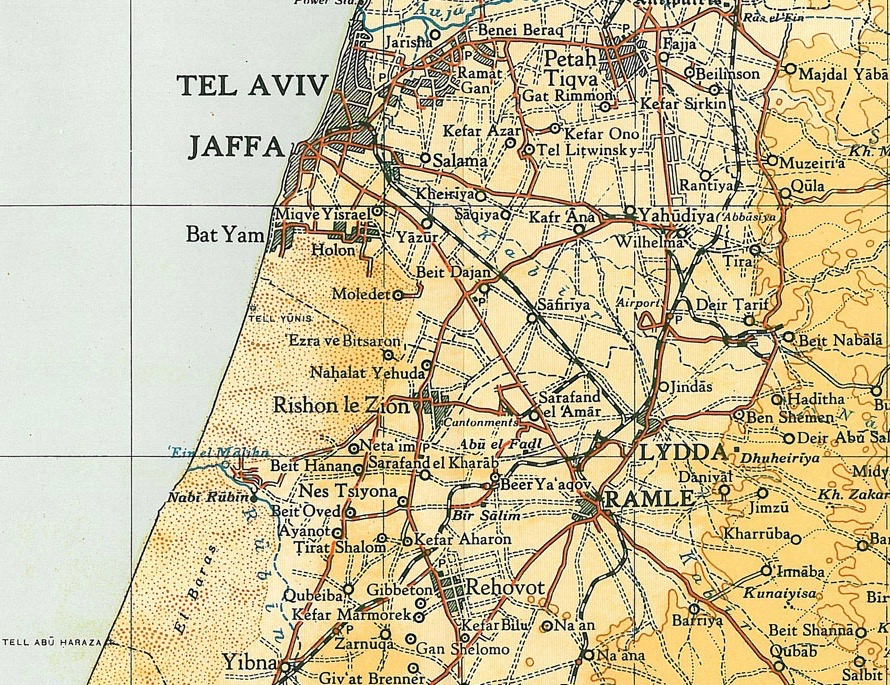
Kafr 'Ana 1945 1:250,000

=== 1948 war and destruction ===
The inhabitants and militiamen of Kafr 'Ana fled in the weeks leading up to the 1948 Arab–Israeli War, during the Haganah's offensive Mivtza Hametz (Operation Hametz) 28–30 April 1948. This operation was held against a group of villages east of Jaffa, including Kafr 'Ana. According to the preparatory orders, the objective was for "opening the way [for Jewish forces] to Lydda". The initial order made no explicit mention of the prospective treatment of the villagers and the order spoke of "cleansing the area" [tihur hashetah]. However, the final operational order stated: "Civilian inhabitants of places conquered would be permitted to leave after they are searched for weapons." During the operation, "the inhabitants and militiamen [sic] panicked and fled with the approach of the Haganah columns or as the rounds began to fall".

Historian Saleh Abdel Jawad writes that indiscriminate killings occurred when the village was occupied on 4 May 1948, resulting in the deaths of ten civilians. (Note: Saleh Abdel Jawad, 2007, Zionist Massacres: the Creation of the Palestinian Refugee Problem in the 1948 War. "4 May 1948: Kofr Ana (Lod area): Indiscriminate killings occur. The village is demoralised and occupied after a period of resistance. Ten civilians are killed on the day of the occupation. Those murdered are either elderly people, who remained in the village, or men, who attempted to flee.")

The village was destroyed shortly after 13 September 1948.

On 23 September 1948 Israeli General Avner named Kafr 'Ana as a suitable village for resettlement for new Jewish immigrants ("olim") to Israel. Today, the modern Israeli city of Or Yehuda, established in 1950, exists upon the lands formerly belonging to the villages of Kafr 'Ana, Saqiya and Kheiriya.

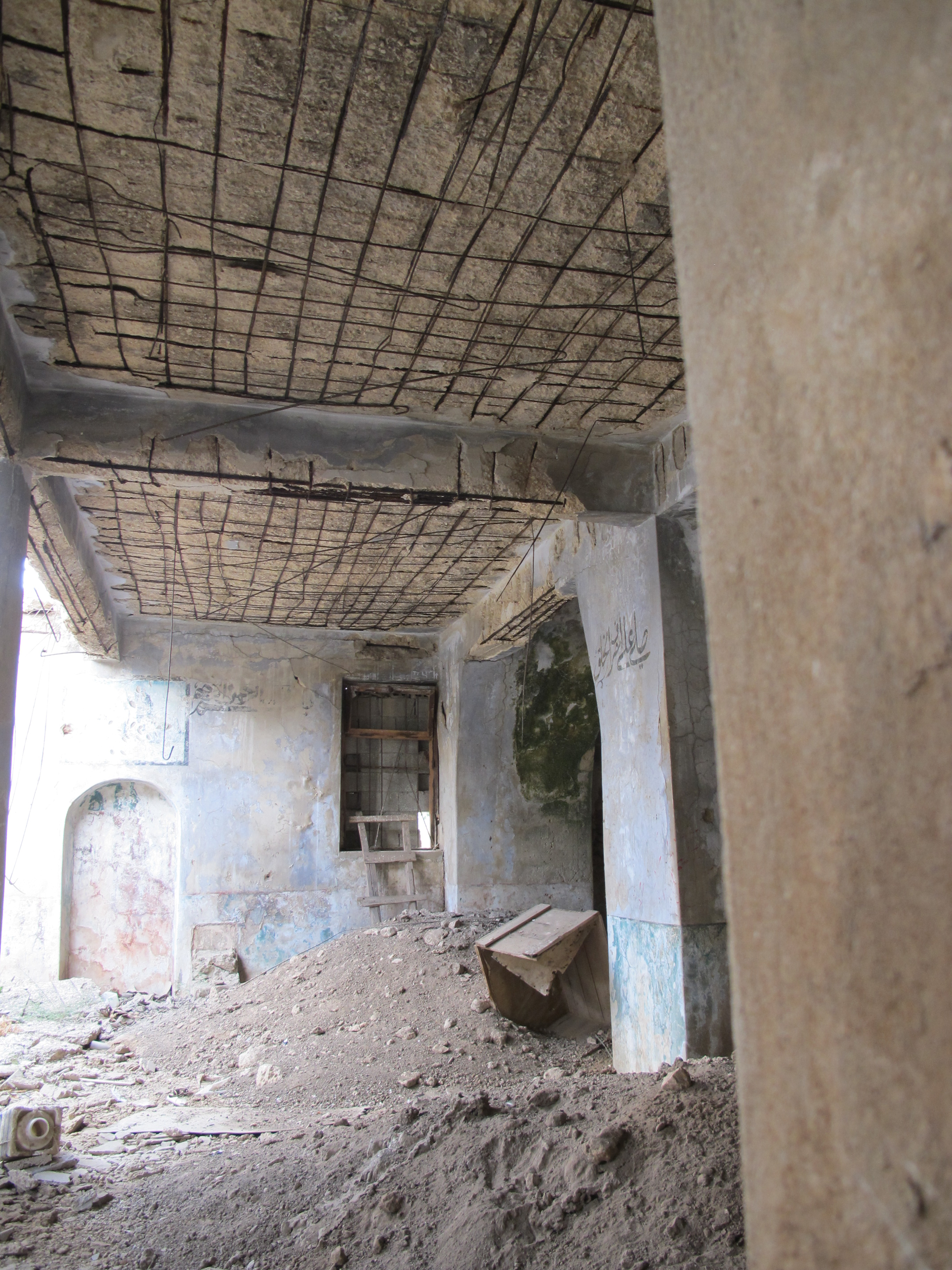
Remains of village mosque, 2011

In 1992 the village site was described: "Part of the site is a vacant lot. On other parts, olive trees grow, along with cypress and eucalyptus trees that have been planted by the residents of the Israeli settlements. No traces of the old houses can be discerned. Apartment buildings and a small park have been built on the surrounding land."

== Culture ==
A woman's thob (loose fitting robe with sleeves), from Kafr Ana, from the 1930s, is in the Museum of International Folk Art (MOIFA) collection at Santa Fe, United States. The dress is of white commercial cotton and the embroidery is multicolored cotton, mainly in red and blue. The qabbeh (the square chest panel) is not a separate panel, but instead executed directly on the dress. The embroidery on the skirt and sleeves is also done directly on the dress. There is some machine embroidery, but most is by hand. The dress has an uncommon round neckline, which was an innovation and was only used here and in the village of Salama, near Jaffa.

== See also ==
- Depopulated Palestinian locations in Israel
- Palestinian costumes

== Bibliography ==
- Barron, J.B., ed. (1923). Palestine: Report and General Abstracts of the Census of 1922. Government of Palestine.
- Conder, C.R.; Kitchener, H.H. (1882). The Survey of Western Palestine: Memoirs of the Topography, Orography, Hydrography, and Archaeology. Vol. 2. London: Committee of the Palestine Exploration Fund.
- Dauphin, C. (1998). La Palestine byzantine, Peuplement et Populations. BAR International Series 726 (in French). Vol. III : Catalogue. Oxford: Archeopress. ISBN 0-860549-05-4.
- Hadawi, S. (1970). Village Statistics of 1945: A Classification of Land and Area ownership in Palestine. Palestine Liberation Organization Research Center.
- Guérin, V. (1868). Description Géographique Historique et Archéologique de la Palestine (in French). Vol. 1: Judee, pt. 1. Paris: L'Imprimerie Nationale.
- Hadawi, S. (1970). Village Statistics of 1945: A Classification of Land and Area ownership in Palestine. Palestine Liberation Organization Research Center.
- Hartmann, M. (1883). "Die Ortschaftenliste des Liwa Jerusalem in dem türkischen Staatskalender für Syrien auf das Jahr 1288 der Flucht (1871)". Zeitschrift des Deutschen Palästina-Vereins. 6: 102–149.
- Hütteroth, W.-D.; Abdulfattah, K. (1977). Historical Geography of Palestine, Transjordan and Southern Syria in the Late 16th Century. Erlanger Geographische Arbeiten, Sonderband 5. Erlangen, Germany: Vorstand der Fränkischen Geographischen Gesellschaft. ISBN 3-920405-41-2.
- Khalidi, W. (1992). All That Remains: The Palestinian Villages Occupied and Depopulated by Israel in 1948. Washington D.C.: Institute for Palestine Studies. ISBN 0-88728-224-5.
- Mills, E., ed. (1932). Census of Palestine 1931. Population of Villages, Towns and Administrative Areas. Jerusalem: Government of Palestine.
- Morris, B. (2004). The Birth of the Palestinian Refugee Problem Revisited. Cambridge University Press. ISBN 0-521-00967-7.
- Palmer, E.H. (1881). The Survey of Western Palestine: Arabic and English Name Lists Collected During the Survey by Lieutenants Conder and Kitchener, R. E. Transliterated and Explained by E.H. Palmer. Committee of the Palestine Exploration Fund.
- Robinson, E.; Smith, E. (1841). Biblical Researches in Palestine, Mount Sinai and Arabia Petraea: A Journal of Travels in the year 1838. Vol. 3. Boston: Crocker & Brewster.
- Singer, A. (2002). Constructing Ottoman Beneficence: An Imperial Soup Kitchen in Jerusalem. Albany: State University of New York Press. ISBN 0-7914-5352-9.
- Socin, A. (1879). "Alphabetisches Verzeichniss von Ortschaften des Paschalik Jerusalem". Zeitschrift des Deutschen Palästina-Vereins. 2: 135–163.
- Stillman, Yedida Kalfon (1979). Palestinian Costume and Jewelry. Albuquerque: University of New Mexico Press. ISBN 0-8263-0490-7.
- Volynsky, Felix; Arbel, Yoav (2015-08-17). "Or Yehuda: Preliminary Report". Hadashot Arkheologiyot (127).
