= Saqiya =

Saqiya ساقِية
- Etymology: "The water wheel"
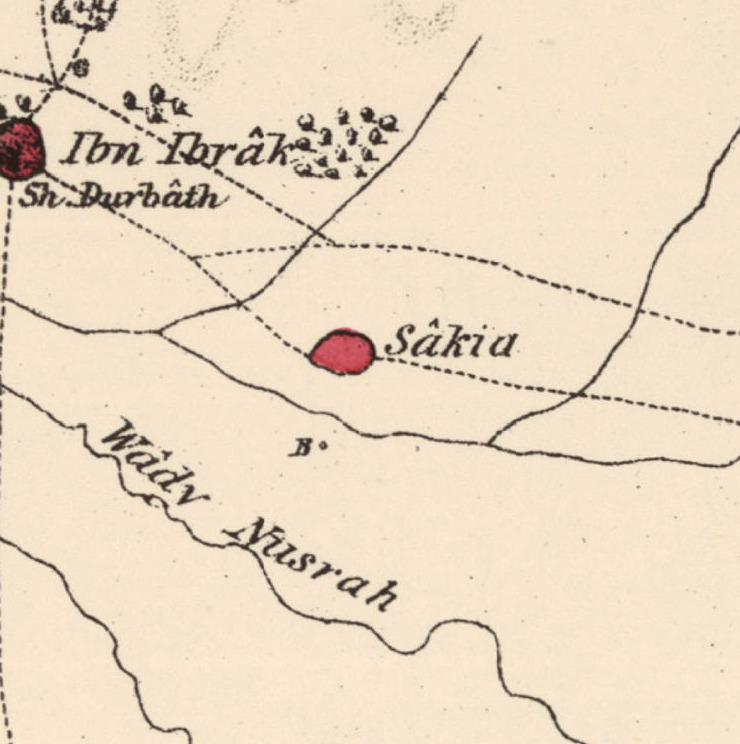
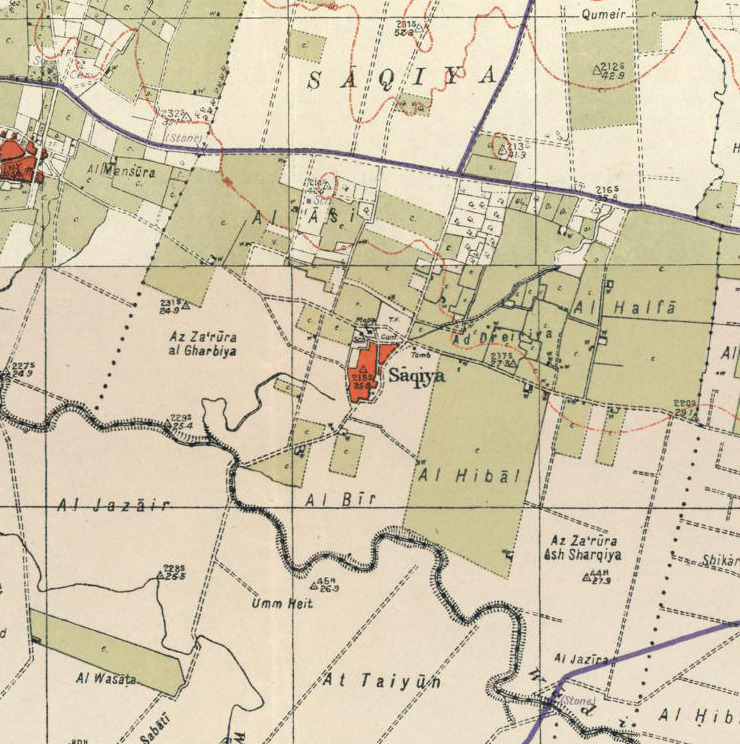
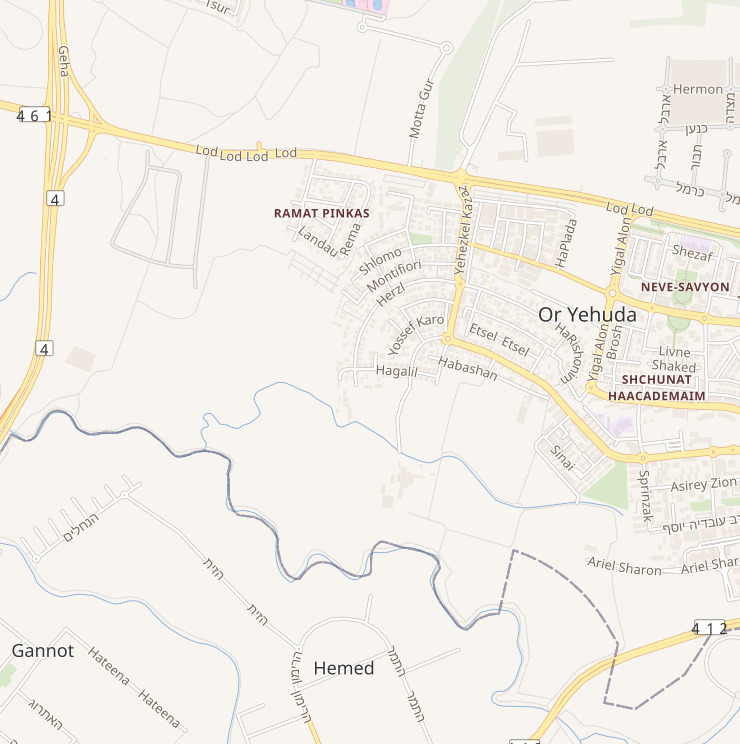
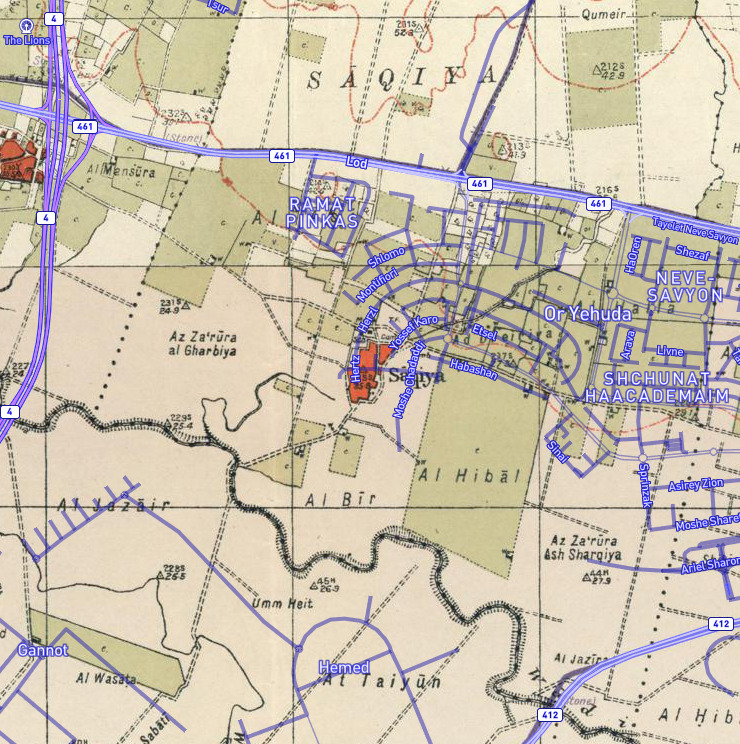
- 1870s map 1940s map modern map 1940s with modern overlay map A series of historical maps of the area around Saqiya (click the buttons)

- Location within Mandatory Palestine
- Coordinates: 32°01′44″N 34°50′35″E
- Palestine grid: 135/159
- Geopolitical entity: Mandatory Palestine
- Subdistrict: Jaffa
- Date of depopulation: 25 April 1948

Area
  - Total: 5,850 dunams (5.85 km^{2}; 2.26 sq mi)

Population (1945)
  - Total: 1,100
- Cause(s) of depopulation: Military assault by Yishuv forces
- Current Localities: Or Yehuda

Saqiya (Arabic: ساقِية, the Arabic name of a mechanical water lifting device) was a village in Palestine (Jaffa district) 8.5 kilometers (5.3 mi) away from Jaffa, depopulated in 1948.

== Location ==
The village was located 8.5 kilometers (5.3 mi) east of Jaffa, 25 meters (82 ft) above sea level, on uneven land in the central coastal plain. A number of paved roads passing through or near the village allowed them to easy access to Ludd and Jaffa, Tel Aviv, as well as the villages adjacent to it.

== Etymology ==
The village’s name denotes “Persian wheel, Latin tympanum”.

== History ==
=== Ottoman era ===
In 1596, under Ottoman rule, Saqiya was a village in the nahiya of Ramla, part of Sanjak Gaza, with a population of 49 households, an estimated 270 people, all Muslim. They paid a fixed tax-rate of 33,3% on agricultural products, including wheat, barley, fruit and sesame, as well as on other types of property, such as goats, beehives and vineyards; a total of 14,300 akçe. 10/24 parts of the revenue went to a Waqf.

The Syrian Sufi teacher and traveller Mustafa al-Bakri al-Siddiqi (1688-1748/9), who toured the region in the first half of the eighteenth century, wrote that he passed through Saqiya while he was on his way to Jaffa.

An Ottoman village list of about 1870 showed that Saqiya had 53 houses and a population of 168, though the population count included men only.

In the 1882, the PEF's Survey of Western Palestine found that the village had a well to the south. The adobe brick-built homes were built close to each other.

=== British Mandate era ===
In the 1922 census of Palestine conducted by the British Mandate authorities, Sakieh had a population of 427 Muslims, increasing in the 1931 census to 663 inhabitants, still all Muslims, in 142 houses.

A primary school for boys was established in 1936. This school acquired 16 dunums of land for agricultural training, and it had 136 pupils enrolled by the mid-forties. The inhabitants of the village engaged mainly in agriculture; cultivating fruit, especially citrus, grains and vegetables.

In the later years on the Mandate some cement buildings were built coupled with a slight expansion of the village. The inhabitants of the village had a mosque, established at the end of the Mandate.

In the 1945 statistics the population had increased to 1,100, all Muslims, while the total land area was 5,850 dunams, according to an official land and population survey. Of the land area, a total of 2422 were used for growing citrus and banana, 145 were for plantations and irrigable land, 2534 for cereals, while 114 dunams were classified as built-up areas.

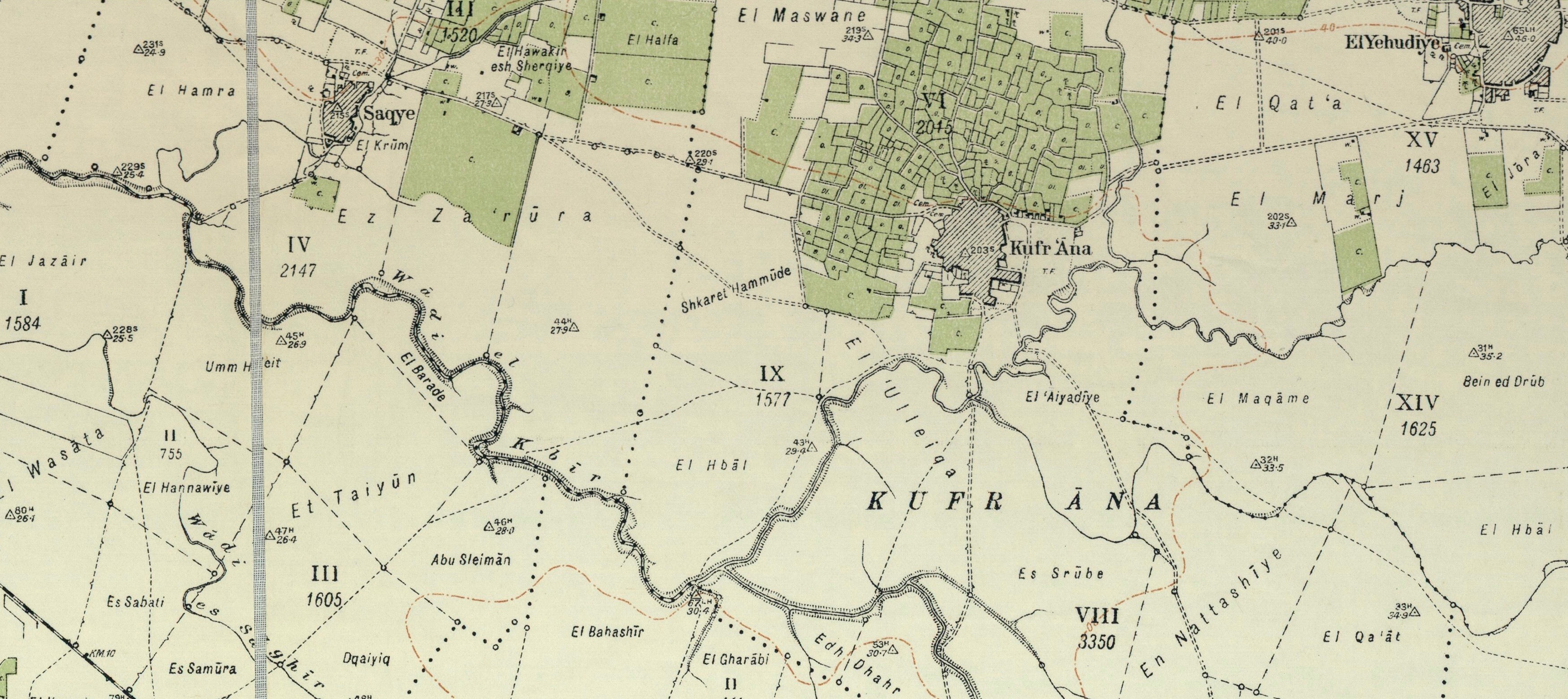
Saqiya 1929, 1:20,000

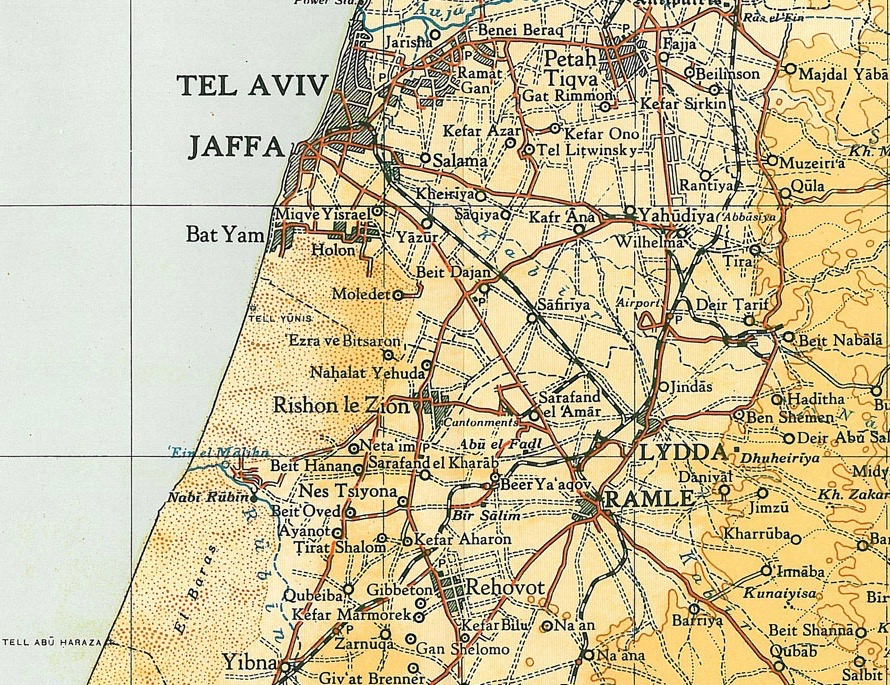
Saqiya 1945 1:250,000

=== 1948 war and aftermath ===
According to Israeli sources the village was attacked and occupied on 25 April 1948. But according to the Palestinians and a telegram sent to the Associated Press noted that it was a few days later on 27–28 April, along with the Khayriya and Kafr Ana villages. Whatever was the case, Saqiya was among the villages targeted in the process of Operation Hametz. The "History of Hagannah" mention that the occupation of Saqiya and the surrounding villages have been done (without fighting) without mentioning anything about the population number at that time.

However, the villagers tell a different story. This is Abu Mohamed from the village, describing what happened on 25 April 1948:

"Jews entered the village and started shooting women, men, and old people. They arrested girls, and we still don't know what happened to them. They came from the settlement that was near the village... They used Bren guns. Then armoured vehicles entered the centre of the village. Fourteen were killed that day... Two women could not run so they were killed in the village... The villagers ran together in the direction of al-Lid. After that families started to leave separately... We left everything in the village... We thought it would be a short trip and we would come back."

In 1950 Or Yehuda was established on the territory of the village for the resettlement of Jews from Iraq and North Africa. Ramat Pinqas was established in the year 1952, on land belonging to the neighboring village of Khayriya.

Palestinian historian Walid Khalidi, described the village remains in 1992: "No more than ten houses remain. Some are inhabited by Jewish families, one is used as a workshop for car repair, and others are deserted. One of the occupied houses has a large front door and a garret with a slanted roof extending along the short side. A second house is quite long and has a large number of windows of various sizes. A third is a two-storey house whose second floor is fronted by a facade decoreted with wide lancet arches. In addition to the houses, there are truncated walls, the mud-brick foundation of a destroyed building, and other debris on the site. There are also cactuses and sycamore, cypress, Christs-thorn, and palm trees. Part of the surrounding land is cultivated; the rest is covered by settlement buildings."

== See also ==
- Depopulated Palestinian locations in Israel

== Bibliography ==
- Barron, J.B., ed. (1923). Palestine: Report and General Abstracts of the Census of 1922. Government of Palestine.
- Conder, C.R.; Kitchener, H.H. (1882). The Survey of Western Palestine: Memoirs of the Topography, Orography, Hydrography, and Archaeology. Vol. 2. London: Committee of the Palestine Exploration Fund.
- Department of Statistics (1945). Village Statistics, April, 1945. Government of Palestine.
- Esber, R. (2008). Under the Cover of War, The Zionist Expulsions of the Palestinians. Arabicus Books & Media. ISBN 978-0981513171.
- Hadawi, S. (1970). Village Statistics of 1945: A Classification of Land and Area ownership in Palestine. Palestine Liberation Organization Research Center.
- Hartmann, M. (1883). "Die Ortschaftenliste des Liwa Jerusalem in dem türkischen Staatskalender für Syrien auf das Jahr 1288 der Flucht (1871)". Zeitschrift des Deutschen Palästina-Vereins. 6: 102–149.
- Hütteroth, W.-D.; Abdulfattah, K. (1977). Historical Geography of Palestine, Transjordan and Southern Syria in the Late 16th Century. Erlanger Geographische Arbeiten, Sonderband 5. Erlangen, Germany: Vorstand der Fränkischen Geographischen Gesellschaft. ISBN 3-920405-41-2.
- Khalidi, W. (1992). All That Remains: The Palestinian Villages Occupied and Depopulated by Israel in 1948. Washington D.C.: Institute for Palestine Studies. ISBN 0-88728-224-5.
- Mills, E., ed. (1932). Census of Palestine 1931. Population of Villages, Towns and Administrative Areas. Jerusalem: Government of Palestine.
- Morris, B. (2004). The Birth of the Palestinian Refugee Problem Revisited. Cambridge University Press. ISBN 0-521-00967-7.
- Palmer, E.H. (1881). The Survey of Western Palestine: Arabic and English Name Lists Collected During the Survey by Lieutenants Conder and Kitchener, R. E. Transliterated and Explained by E.H. Palmer. Committee of the Palestine Exploration Fund.
- Socin, A. (1879). "Alphabetisches Verzeichniss von Ortschaften des Paschalik Jerusalem". Zeitschrift des Deutschen Palästina-Vereins. 2: 135–163.
