= Or Yehuda =

Or Yehuda אור יהודה (Hebrew)
- City

Hebrew transcription(s)
  - ISO 259: ʔor Yhuda
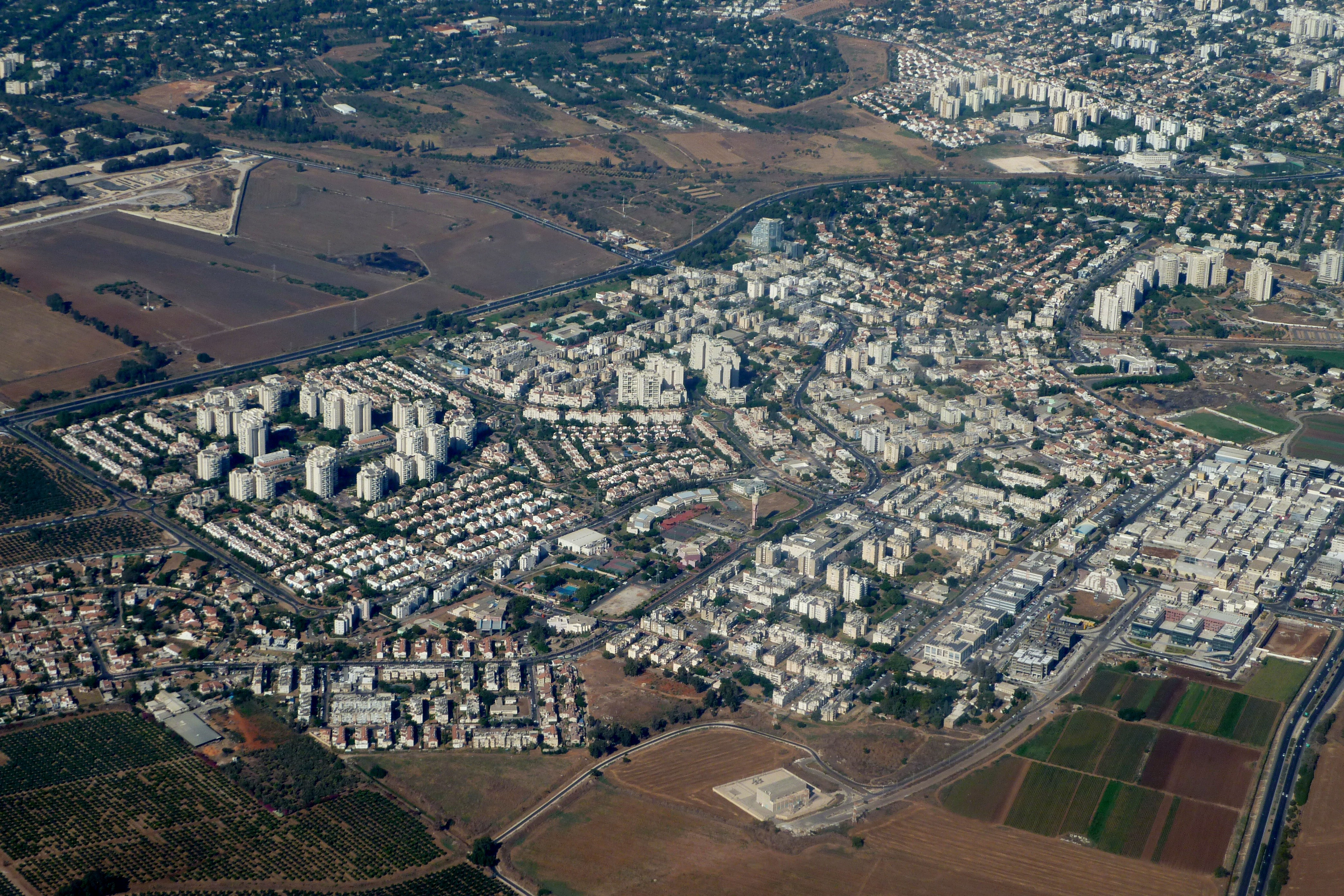
- View of Or Yehuda

- Flag Coat of arms

- Location within Central Israel Location within Israel
- Coordinates: 32°01′50″N 34°51′12″E
- Country: Israel
- District: Tel Aviv
- Natural Region: Ramat Gan
- Founded: 3500 BCE (Earliest settlement); 2000 BCE (Biblical city of Ono); 1955 (Israeli city)

Government
  - Type: Mayor–council
  - Body: Municipality of Or Yehuda
  - Mayor: Liat Shochat

Area
  - Total: 6,500 dunams (6.5 km^{2}; 2.5 sq mi)

Population (2024)
  - Total: 41,130
  - Density: 6,300/km^{2} (16,000/sq mi)

Ethnicity
  - Jews and others: 99.8%
  - Arabs: 0.2%
- Time zone: UTC+2 (IST)
  - Summer (DST): UTC+3 (IDT)
- Name meaning: Judah's Light
- Website: www.oryehuda.muni.il

Or Yehuda (Hebrew: אור יהודה, lit. 'Judah's Light') is a city in the Tel Aviv District of Israel. Located in the Gush Dan metropolitan area, in 2024 it had a population of 41,130.

== History ==
=== Prehistory ===
Human settlement back to the Chalcolithic has been found on the site.

=== Antiquity and Bible ===
Or Yehuda is located on the site of the biblical town of Ono. The name was used by Canaanites and then by Israelites as well (1 Chronicles 8:12), all throughout the First and Second Temple periods. Jewish classical writings mention the city as being formerly enclosed by a wall.

=== Ottoman period ===
The built-up area of two Muslim Arab villages, Kafr 'Ana in the east and Saqiya to the west, are located within the current Or Yehuda city limits. Both villages date back to at least the 16th century, when Suleiman the Magnificent's haseki sultan, Roxelana aka Hürrem Sultan, endowed them to her Jerusalem soup kitchen. During the 18th and 19th centuries, the area belonged to the nahiyeh (sub-district) of Lydda that encompassed the area of the present-day city of Modi'in-Maccabim-Re'ut in the south to the present-day city of El'ad in the north, and from the foothills in the east, through the Lod Valley to the outskirts of Jaffa in the west. This area was home to thousands of inhabitants in about 20 villages, who had at their disposal tens of thousands of hectares of prime agricultural land.

=== British Mandate ===
In the 1931 census of Palestine conducted by the British Mandate authorities, Kafr 'Ana had a population of 1,824 Muslims in 449 houses and Saqiya 663 Muslim inhabitants in 142 houses.

==== 1948 war ====
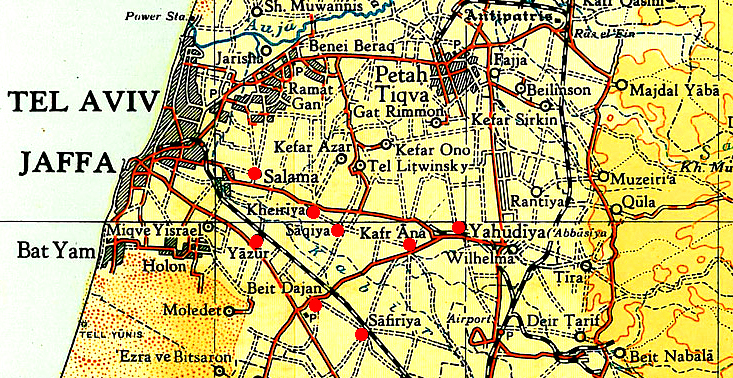
Villages captured during Operation Hametz

In the end of April 1948, the Haganah launched military operation Hametz, which aimed to conquer several villages inland from Jaffa to isolate it from the Arab hinterland. The fate awaiting the inhabitants was not made explicit, other than stating the inhabitants would be allowed to leave, but a general order envisaged 'cleansing the area' (tihur hashetah) and the villages of Kafr 'Ana and Saqiya were depopulated.

=== State of Israel ===
==== Temporary accommodation (1949-1955) ====
In 1949, immigrants from Libya and Turkey settled on the sites of the villages of Saqiya and Kafr 'Ana, which did not have water or sewage infrastructure.

In 1950–1953, the ma'abarot (provisional settlements for immigrants) Saqiya A, Saqiya B, Kafr 'Ana A, and Kafr 'Ana B were established on land near the former villages. These ma'abarot housed mainly immigrants from Iraq who arrived as part of Operation Ezra and Nehemiah. Ma'abarot at the time were treated by authorities as temporary accommodations until permanent resettlement could occur on-site or elsewhere. Attempts to induce neighboring Tel Aviv and Ramat Gan to extend their municipal borders to cover these ma'abarot failed, and the ma'abarot residents resisted relocation to development towns in the north and south. In 1952, the religious settlement of Ramat Pinkas (also known as Givat Hemed and Givat Mordechi) was established for some of the ma'abarot residents.

==== Or Yehuda (est. 1955) ====
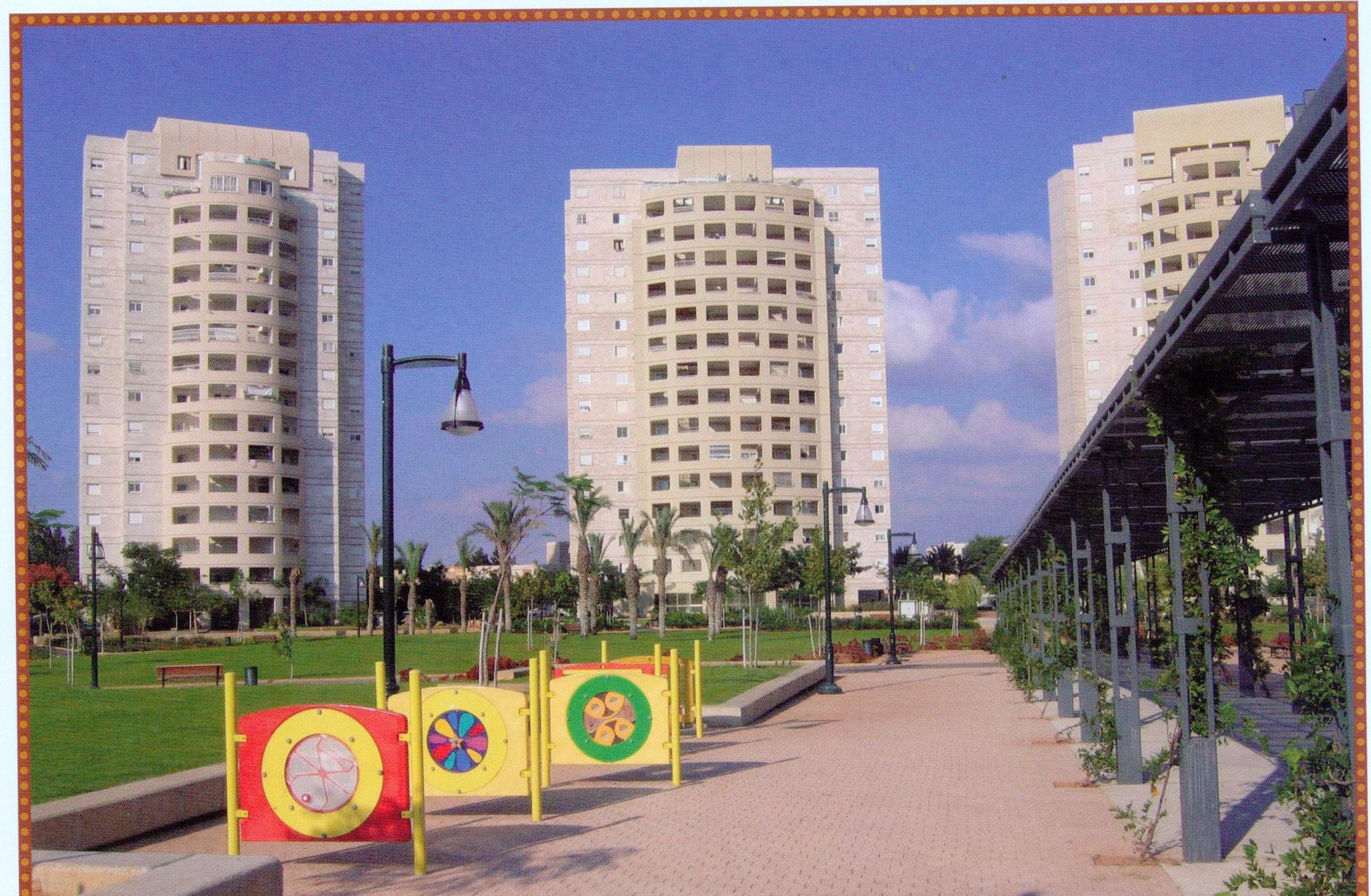
Or Yehuda residential towers

The modern town of Or Yehuda was officially established by the State of Israel in 1955 and was named after Judah Alkalai. In 1962 Or Yehuda was recognized as a municipal planning authority, which led to increased development. In 1988, Or Yehuda was declared a city, due to the increase in the number of residents.

In April 2001, Hamas suicide bombers blew up a car in Or Yehuda, injuring eight people.

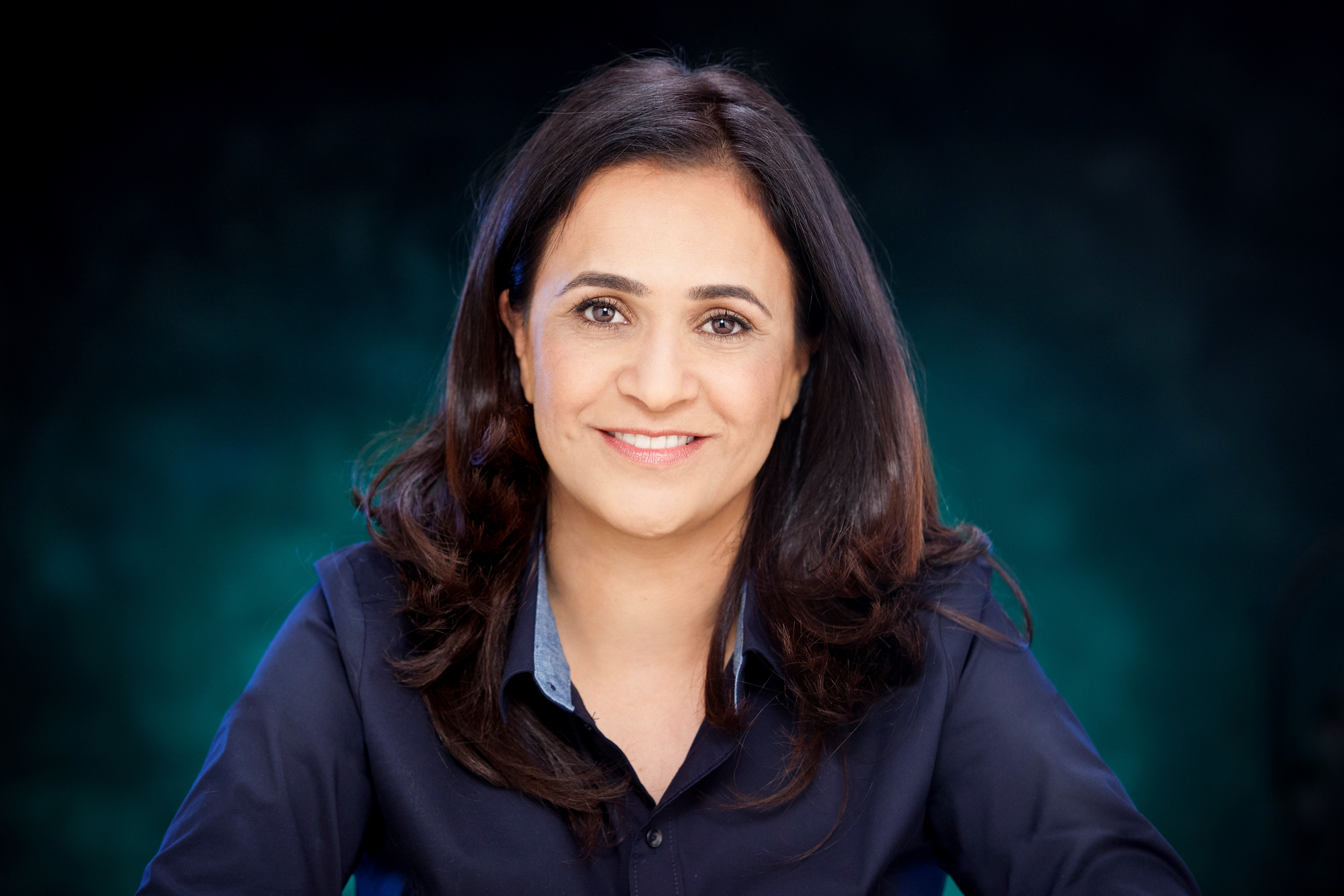
Liat Shohat, mayor since 2015

In 2008, the Ef'al Regional Council was liquidated, and lands belonging to the council south of route 461, including Ramat Pinkas, were annexed to Or Yehuda.

== Demographics ==
Historical population
Year	Pop.	±%
1972	14,800	—
1983	19,100	+29.1%
1995	23,200	+21.5%
2008	33,900	+46.1%
2022	36,850	+8.7%
2024	41,130	+11.6%

According to the CBS, in 2001 the ethnic makeup of the city was 100.0% Jewish. In 2001 there were 13,900 males and 14,000 females. The population of the city was spread out, with 34.6% 19 years of age or younger, 17.7% between 20 and 29, 20.5% between 30 and 44, 15.8% from 45 to 59, 3.1% from 60 to 64, and 8.2% 65 years of age or older. The population growth rate in 2001 was 3.4%.

== Economy ==
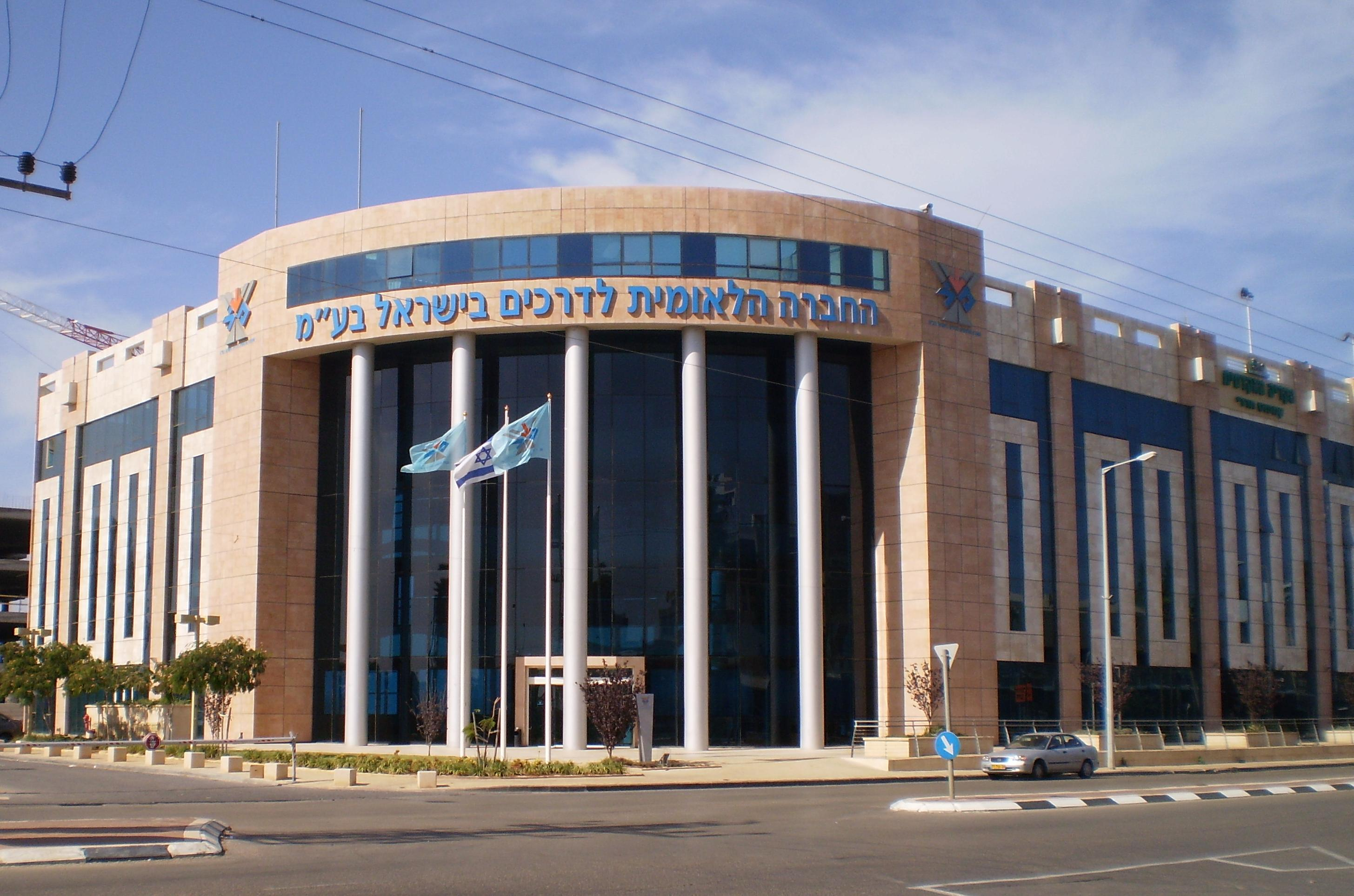
National Roads Company of Israel, Or Yehuda

Babylon Ltd., a developer of online translation programs that holds the Guinness World Record for the highest number of downloads of a language solution software, is based in Or Yehuda. The headquarters of the National Roads Company of Israel is located in Or Yehuda.

== Education and culture ==
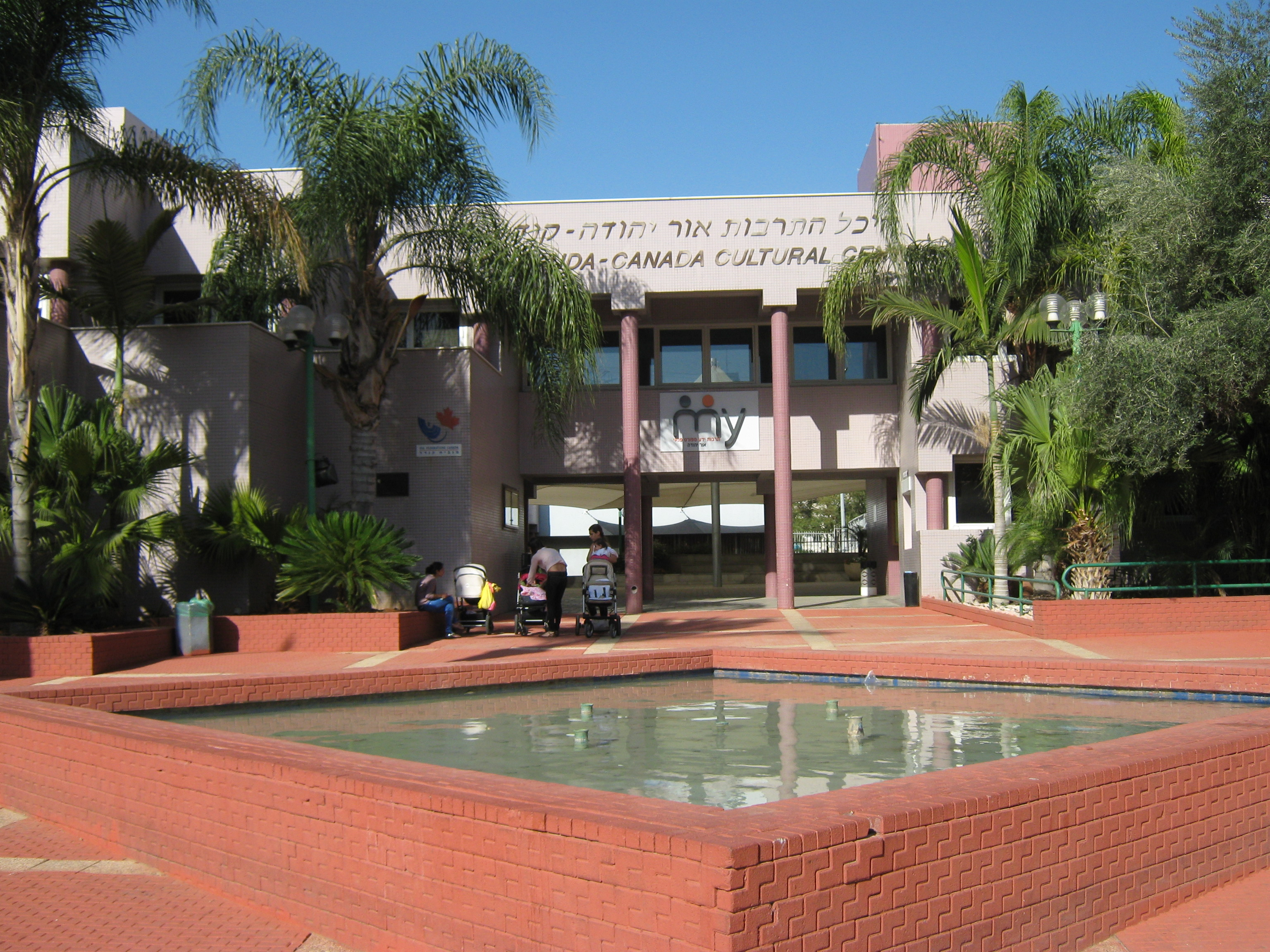
Or Yehuda cultural center

In 2000, Or Yehuda had 14 schools and a student enrollment of 5,147 students (10 elementary schools with 2,894 students, and 6 high schools with 2,253 students). 55.7% of 12th graders were entitled to a matriculation certificate in 2001.

In 1982, Or Yehuda was one of the first few cities to take part in the Program for Talented Youth in Mathematics, established by Professor Zvi Arad and Bernark Pinchuk, at Bar-Ilan University. Among the high-school students of Or Yehuda participating in this program was Boaz Tsaban, who proceeded to win national prizes for his achievements, and is now a professor of mathematics at Bar-Ilan University.

The Babylonian Jewry Heritage Center, a museum documenting the history of the Iraqi Jewish community, was established in Or Yehuda in 1988. The museum, located at Mordechai Ben-Porat Av No. 83, also includes a library (open to the public by appointment only).

== Sports ==
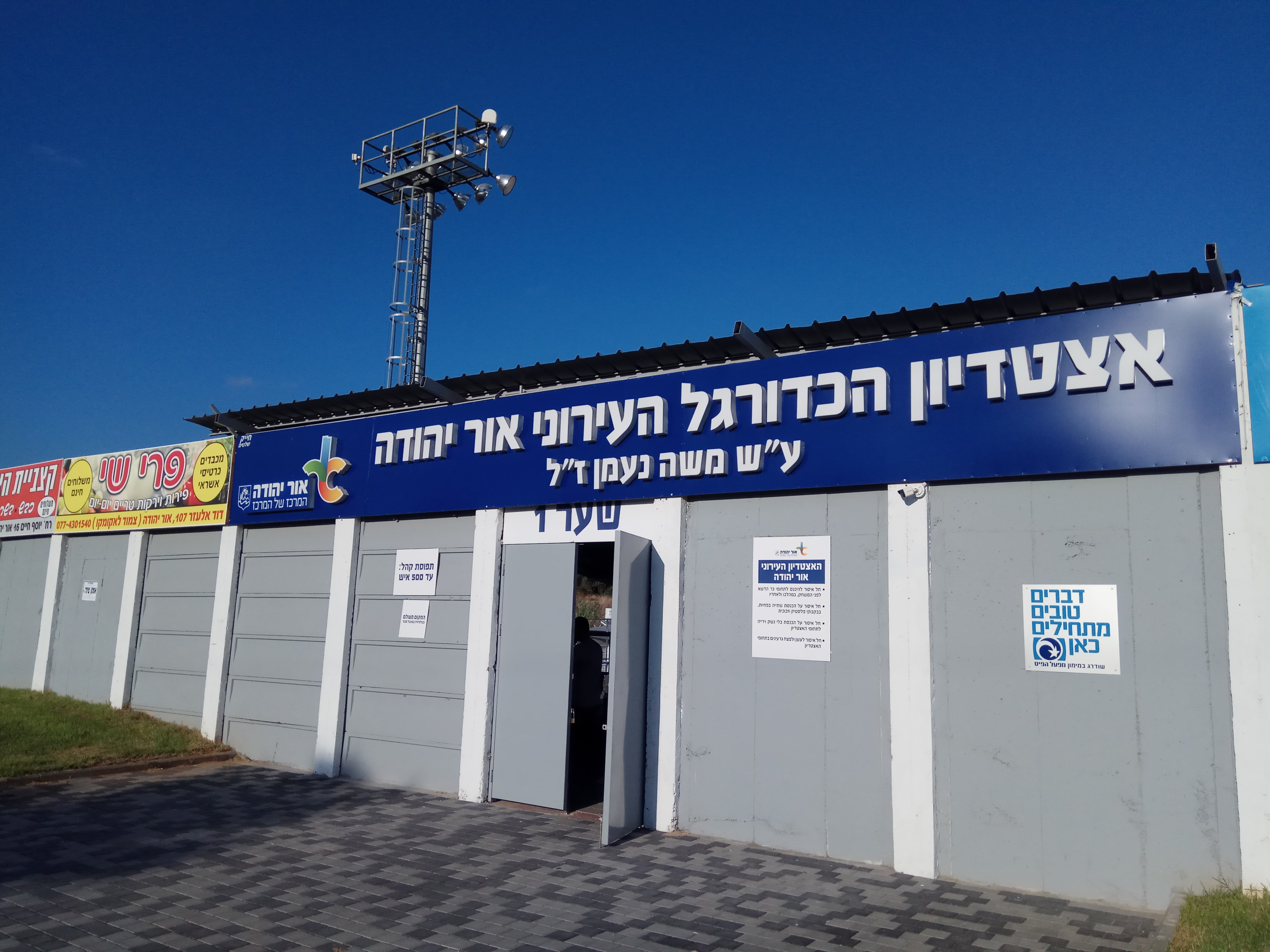
The municipal football stadium

Football team F.C. Ironi Or Yehuda currently plays in the Liga Alef South Division, the fourth Israeli division. On 5 April 2019, they lost 5–1 to Hapoel Ramat Yisrael F.C. in the Liga Bet, but their goalkeeper Isaak Hayik, 73 years old, broke the Guinness World Record for oldest player.

== Voting Patterns ==
In the 2022 election, 76 percent of voters in Or Yehuda voted for the parties of the right-wing coalition led by Benjamin Netanyahu, while 22 percent voted for the parties of the center-left coalition led by Yair Lapid and 0.1 percent voted for the Arab parties.

In the 2026 election, 70 percent of voters in Or Yehuda voted for the parties of the right-wing coalition led by Benjamin Netanyahu, while 25 percent voted for the parties of the center-left coalition led by Gadi Eisenkot and 0.1 percent voted for the Arab parties. An additional 3.9 percent voted for the Reservists, and 1.4 percent voted for Amcha Yisrael. Voter turnout increased 19 percent from the 2022 election.

== Notable people ==
- Elida Gera (1931-2017), US-Israeli film director, dancer, and choreographer
- Isaak Hayik (born 1945), football player
- David Mena (born 1953), lawyer and former Likud member of the Knesset

== Twin towns – sister cities ==
Or Yehuda is twinned with:

- Charlottenburg-Wilmersdorf, Berlin, Germany
- (United States) Milwaukee, USA – sister city of Or Yehuda since 1978

== See also ==
- Israel Goodovitch, chief architect of "The Growing House" ("Envelope System") in Or Yehuda, 1975–1978
- List of modern names for biblical place names
- Economy of Israel
- Or Yehuda Agriculture School
