= Beneberak =

Biblical city in the Levant

Coordinates: 32°2′12.03″N 34°49′39.61″E

Benebarak ("Sons of Barak") (Hebrew: בְּנֵי בְּרַק, Bnei Brak) was a biblical city mentioned in the Book of Joshua. According to the biblical account it was allocated to the Tribe of Dan. Its archaeological site is Tel Bnei Brak.

== History ==
The town of Beneberak (Banaibarka) is specifically named in the Aramaic stele (Oriental Institute Prism) among other historical records detailing Sennacherib's military exploits in the country, along with the towns of Beth-Dagon and Joppa, as places subdued by him.

In the Talmudic era, Beneberak became the seat of the court of Rabbi Akiva, and is identified as the site of his all-night seder in the Passover Haggadah.

Benebarak was also associated with agriculture, as evident from the Talmudic account of the sage Rami bar Yehezkel, who declared that he understood the meaning of the Torah's description of the Land of Israel as a "land flowing with milk and honey" after a scene he witnessed in Beneberak. He saw goats grazing beneath fig trees and the honey oozing from the very ripe figs merged with the milk dripping from the goats and formed a stream of milk and honey.

== Other places ==
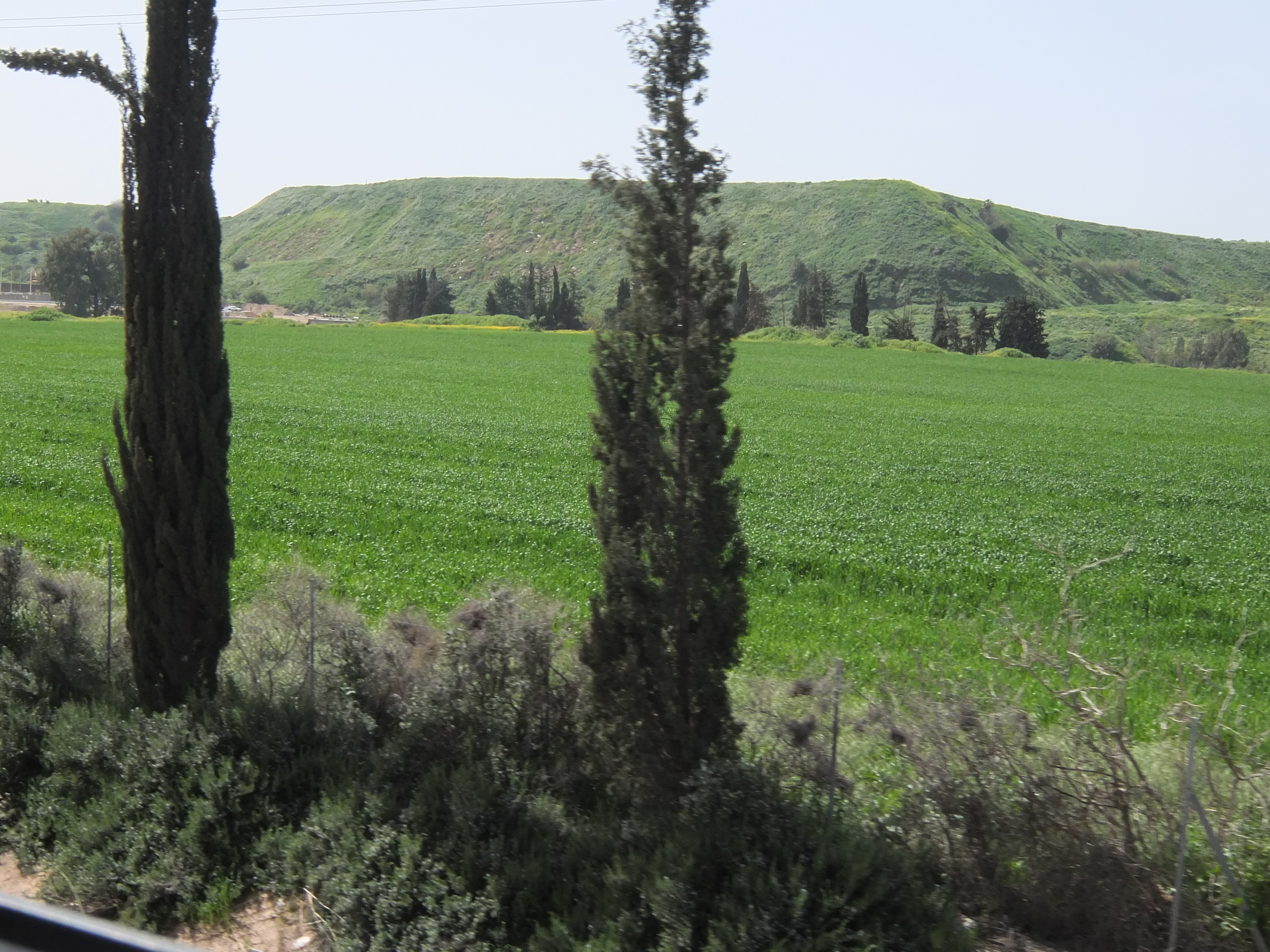
Landfill in Israel, where the old village of Beneberak (Bnei Brak) once stood

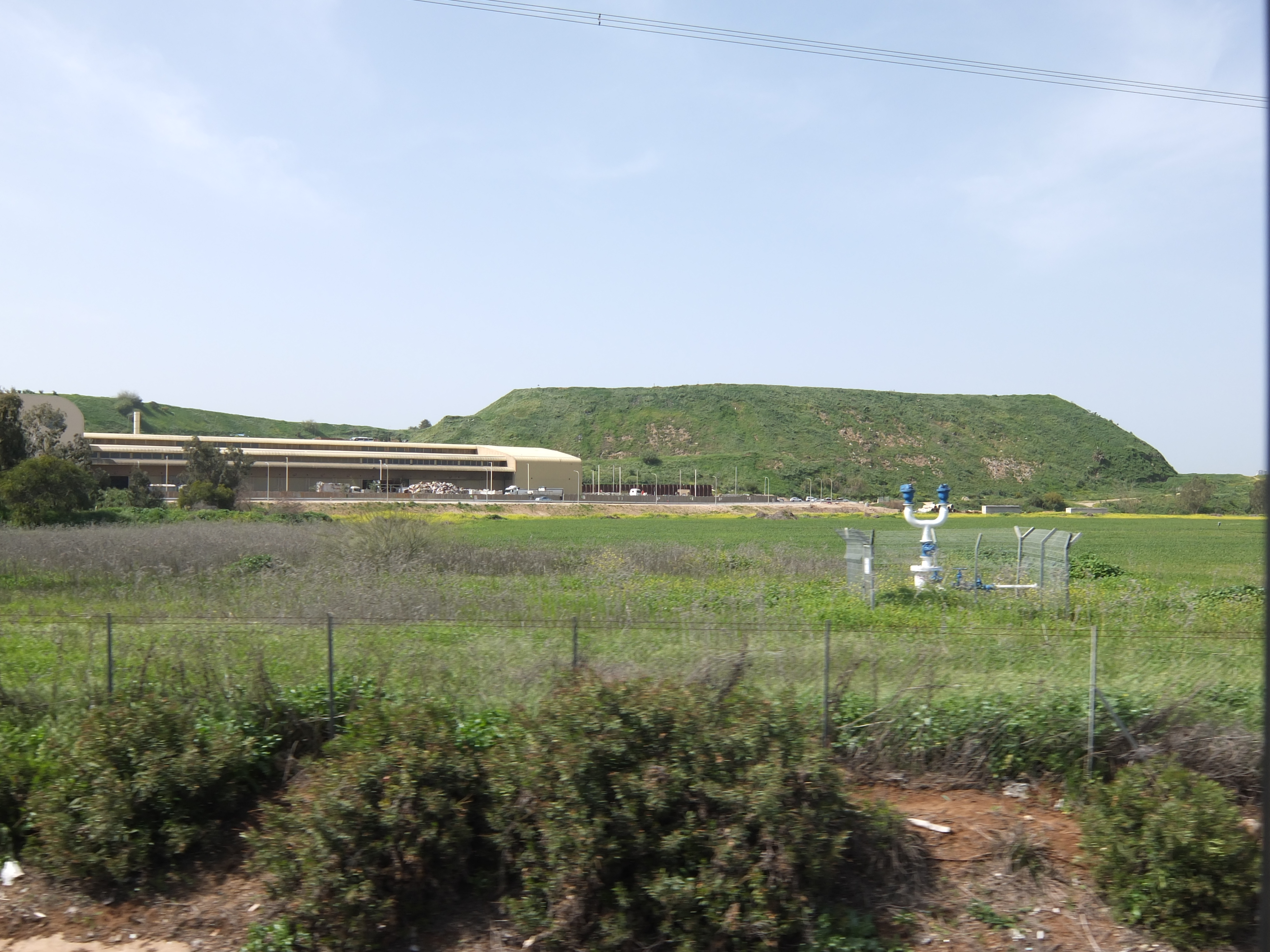
Landfill near the old village of Beneberak (Bnei Brak)

The Palestinian village of Ibn Ibraq ('Son of Ibraq/Barak') was located on the site of the biblical city and its name was seen as a continuation of the name of the ancient site. In 1924, the Jewish agricultural settlement of Bnei Brak, which was named for the ancient city, was established 4 kilometers (2.5 mi) to the north. Ibn Ibraq's Arab villagers subsequently renamed it al-Khayriyya to distinguish it from Bnei Brak. Al-Khayriyya was depopulated during a military assault as part of Operation Hametz during the 1948 Arab-Israeli War.

A large waste transfer station, known as Hiriya, was built at the ancient/modern site, now converted into the Ariel Sharon Park.
