= Ono, Benjamin =

Biblical town in Benjamin

Ono
- אונו (Hebrew)
- Kafr 'Ana
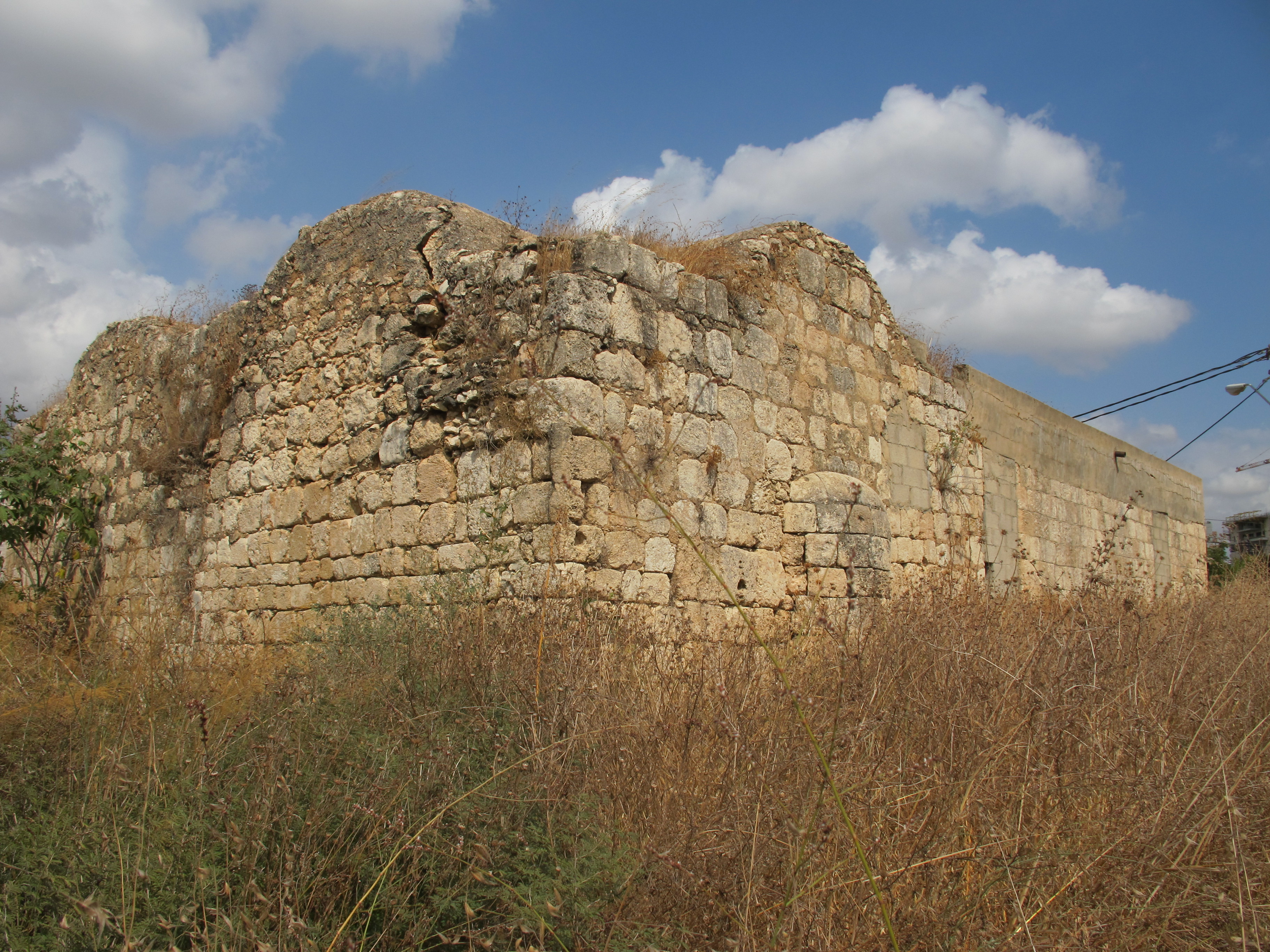
- Standing structure of mosque

- Location within Mandatory Palestine Location within Israel
- 32°01′38″N 34°52′05″E
- Periods: Chalcolithic period to present
- Cultures: Canaanite, Jewish, Greco-Roman, Byzantine, Islamic, Ottoman, Israeli
- Location: Israel
- Region: Sdot Dan

Site notes
- Excavation dates: 1998
- Archaeologists: A. Gorzalczany, R. Gophna, I. Taxel, and A. Feldstein
- Condition: Inhabited

Ono (Hebrew: אונו) was a biblical town of Benjamin in the "plain of Ono" (1 Chr. 8:12; Ezra 2:33). The modern Kiryat Ono is not to be confused with the biblical Ono.

== History ==
The biblical town of Ono (1 Chronicles 8:12; Nehemiah 6:2) has been identified by most scholars with the Palestinian village, Kafr 'Ana, whereon is now built Or Yehuda, or, more specifically, with the nearby ruin of Kafr Juna, as Kafr 'Ana actually represents a Byzantine-period expansion of a nearby and much older site –– Kafr Juna, believed to be the ancient Ono. The territory of Benjamin was known to stretch from a place around Jerusalem to the plains on the west. According to the Mishnah, the town of Ono was encompassed by a wall before the Israelite conquest of Canaan under Joshua.

Not succeeding in their attempts to deter Nehemiah from rebuilding the walls of Jerusalem, Sanballat and Tobiah resorted to stratagem, and pretending to wish a conference with him, they invited him to meet them at Ono. Four times they made the request, and every time Nehemiah refused to come. Their objective was to take him prisoner.

== Archaeology ==
In 2009, two separate archaeological excavations were conducted in Ono, one by Nissim Golding-Meir on behalf of the Hebrew Union College-Jewish Institute of Religion, Jerusalem, and the other by Jenny Marcus on behalf of the Israel Antiquities Authority (IAA).
