= Elida Gera =

Israeli film director, dancer and choreographer

Elida Gera (Hebrew: אלידע גרא; 1932 – May 10, 2017) was an Israeli film director, dancer and choreographer. She is the first Israeli female film director who released a feature film (Before Tomorrow, black and white, 1969). The second one is Michal Bat-Adam with her Moments released ten years later.

== Biography ==
Gera was born in New York City in 1931. She studied dance at Juilliard School, performed off-Broadway and later worked as choreographer. She became interested in cinema and studied directing and photography in Canada. There she married an Israeli artist and stage designer Zvi Gera and the two had three sons. In 1964 they emigrated to Israel and settled in Or Yehuda.

In 2013 her restored film Before Tomorrow was screened at the International Women's Film Festival In Rehovot.

She died in 2017 in Megadim.
