= Al-Khayriyya =

Al-Khayriyya الخيْريّة el-Kheiriyah, Kheiriya
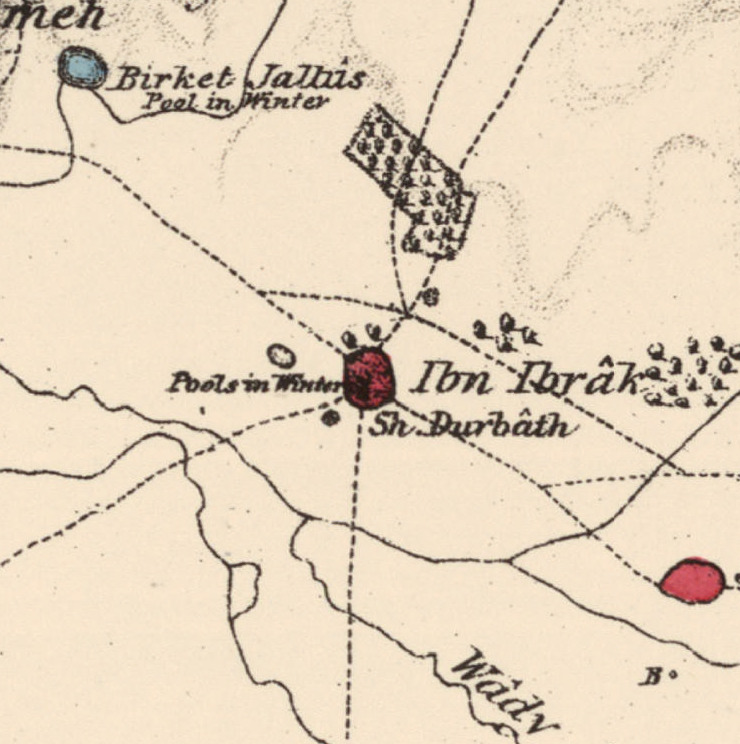
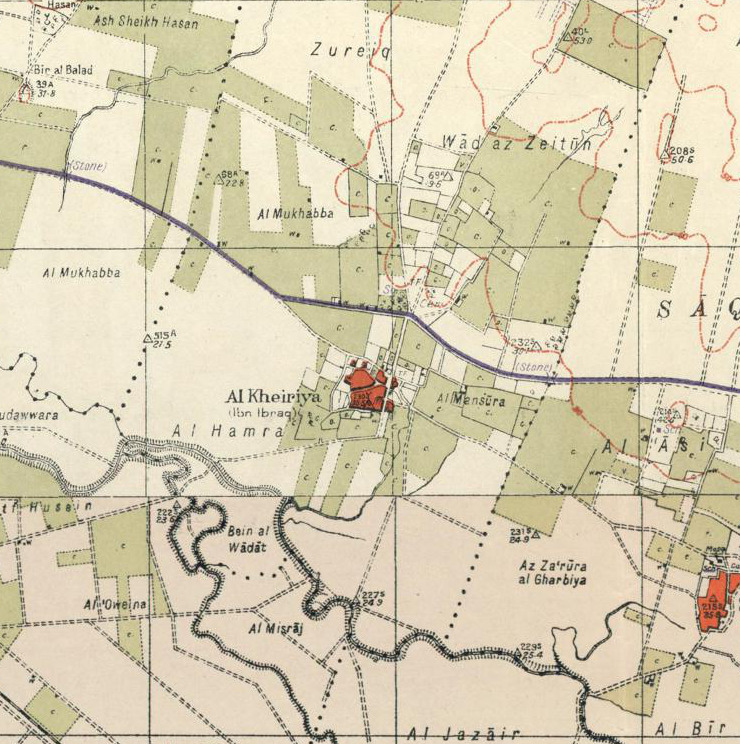
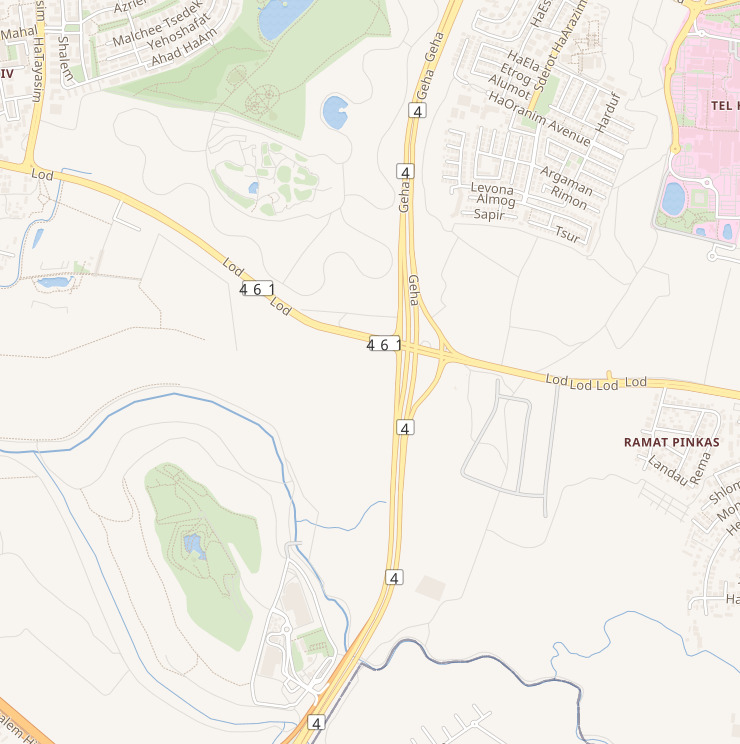
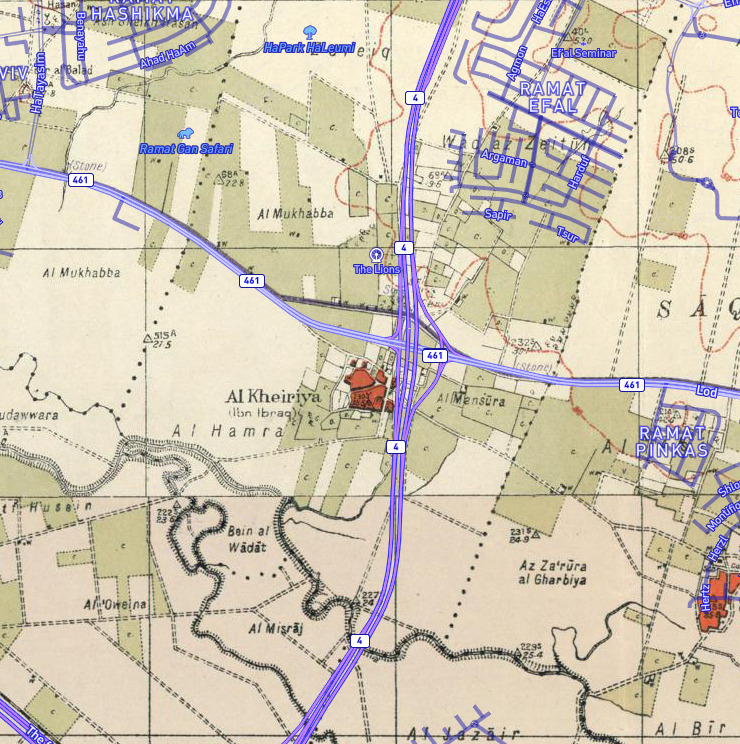
- 1870s map 1940s map modern map 1940s with modern overlay map A series of historical maps of the area around Al-Khayriyya (click the buttons)

- Location within Mandatory Palestine
- Coordinates: 32°2′14″N 34°49′41″E
- Palestine grid: 133/160
- Geopolitical entity: Mandatory Palestine
- Subdistrict: Jaffa
- Date of depopulation: 25 April 1948

Area
  - Total: 13,672 dunams (13.672 km^{2}; 5.279 sq mi)

Population (1945)
  - Total: 1,420
- Cause(s) of depopulation: Military assault by Yishuv forces
- Current Localities: Ramat Pinkas Ariel Sharon Park Ramat Gan National Park

Al-Khayriyya (Arabic: الخيْريّة), also Ibn Ibraq, was a Palestinian Arab village located 7.5 kilometers east of Jaffa. It became depopulated in April 1948 as a result of a military assault by the Alexandroni Brigade of the pre-state Israeli forces during the 1948 Palestine war. The village lands would later be used by Israel as the Hiriya landfill.

== History ==
At the time of Assyrian rule in Palestine, al-Khayriyya was known as Banai Berka and during Roman rule, it was known as by Beneberak. Late Roman and Byzantine ceramics have been found in the area. In 938/9 a sanctuary was constructed in Al-Khayriyya, on the orders of the Qadi of Damascus. During the Crusader era it was known as Bombrac, mentioned in 1191 in the Itinerarium Regis Ricardi of King Richard I of England.

=== Ottoman era ===
In 1517, the village was incorporated into the Ottoman Empire with the rest of Palestine, and in 1596 the village, called Hayriyya, appeared in the Ottoman tax registers as being in the nahiya of Ramla (liwa´ of Gaza), with a population of 28 Muslim households, an estimated 154 persons. The villagers paid a fixed tax rate of 25% on a number of crops, including wheat, barley, fruits and sesame, as well as on other types of property, such as goats, beehives and vineyards; a total of 4,000 akçe.

Later in the Ottoman period the village was called Ibn Ibraq, preserving the ancient name.

An Ottoman village list from about 1870 found that Jabrak had a population of 208, in 68 houses, though the population count included only men.

In 1882, the PEF's Survey of Western Palestine described the village, then named Ibn Ibrak, as "an ordinary mud village".

=== British Mandate era ===
At the time of the British Mandate for Palestine the villagers changed the name of the village to al-Khayriyya to distinguish it from the newly-established neighbouring Jewish town of Bnei Brak. The population was predominantly Muslim with twenty Christians. A school for boys was established in 1920, and it had a plot of 8 dunums of land attached to it for agricultural training. A school for girls was founded in 1945. By 1946, there were 183 boys and 69 girls in these schools.

In the 1922 census of Palestine conducted by the British Mandate authorities, Khairiyeh had a population of 546, 5 Christians and the rest Muslims. In the 1931 census the population of El Kheiriya had increased to 914, 5 Christians and the rest Muslims, in 212 houses.

The villagers worked primarily in agriculture and animal husbandry.

In the 1945 statistics the population of Al-Khayriyya was 1,420: 1,400 Muslims and 20 Christians, with 13,672 dunams of land. Of this, a total of 3,359 dunams of village land was used for citrus and bananas and 2,355 dunums for cereals, while 1,275 dunums were irrigated or used for orchards. Numerous artesian wells supplied them with irrigation water. 26 dunams were classified as built-up (urban) areas.

The Jewish settlement of Kfar Azar was established on what was traditionally village land in 1932.

=== 1948 War and State of Israel ===
According to the Palestine Post, in early 1948, the village residents repeatedly attacked the nearby Ef'al settlement. The newspaper also reported that on 16 February 1948, the Haganah blew up a two-story house that was used by snipers against Ef'al.

The village of Al-Khayriyya was depopulated in the weeks leading up to the 1948 Palestine war, during the Haganah's offensive Mivtza Hametz (Operation Hametz) 28–30 April 1948. This operation was held against a group of villages east of Jaffa, including Al-Khayriyya. According to the preparatory orders, the objective was to "opening the way [for Jewish forces] to Lydda". Though there was no explicit mention of the prospective treatment of the villagers, the order spoke of "cleansing the area" [tihur hashetah]. The final operational order stated: "Civilian inhabitants of places conquered would be permitted to leave after they are searched for weapons."

During 28–30 April, the Haganah took Al-Khayriyya without a fight, the HIS attributed the non-resistance of the inhabitants to prior Arab defeats, and later added that "it is clear that the inhabitants [...] would willingly return to their villages and accept Jewish protection."

The Alexandroni Brigade 32nd Battalion reported that they found and buried the bodies of four adult men and three women in the village, and briefly detained a handful of men, women and children. Two of the adult male villagers were charged with having killed a Haganah man, and they were then promptly executed.

Following the war, the area was incorporated into the State of Israel. In 1952 and 1969 the villages of Ramat Pinkas and Ramat Ef'al, respectively, were established on village land, north of the village site. Both are now part of the suburbs of Giv'atayim.

Palestinian historian Walid Khalidi described the village remains in 1992: "A handful of houses and one of the schools remain. One deserted house, surrounded by shrubs and wild vegetation, has simple architecture: a rectangular door, small side windows, and a flat roof. A two-storey house, identified as having belonged to Ahmad al-Tibi, is used as a store. It has rectangular doors and windows and a gabled roof. Cypress, fig, Christ's-thorn, and orange trees grow on the site. Part of the adjacent land is cultivated and the rest is occupied by buildings."

The village lands were later designated for a landfill known as Hiriya.

== Gallery ==
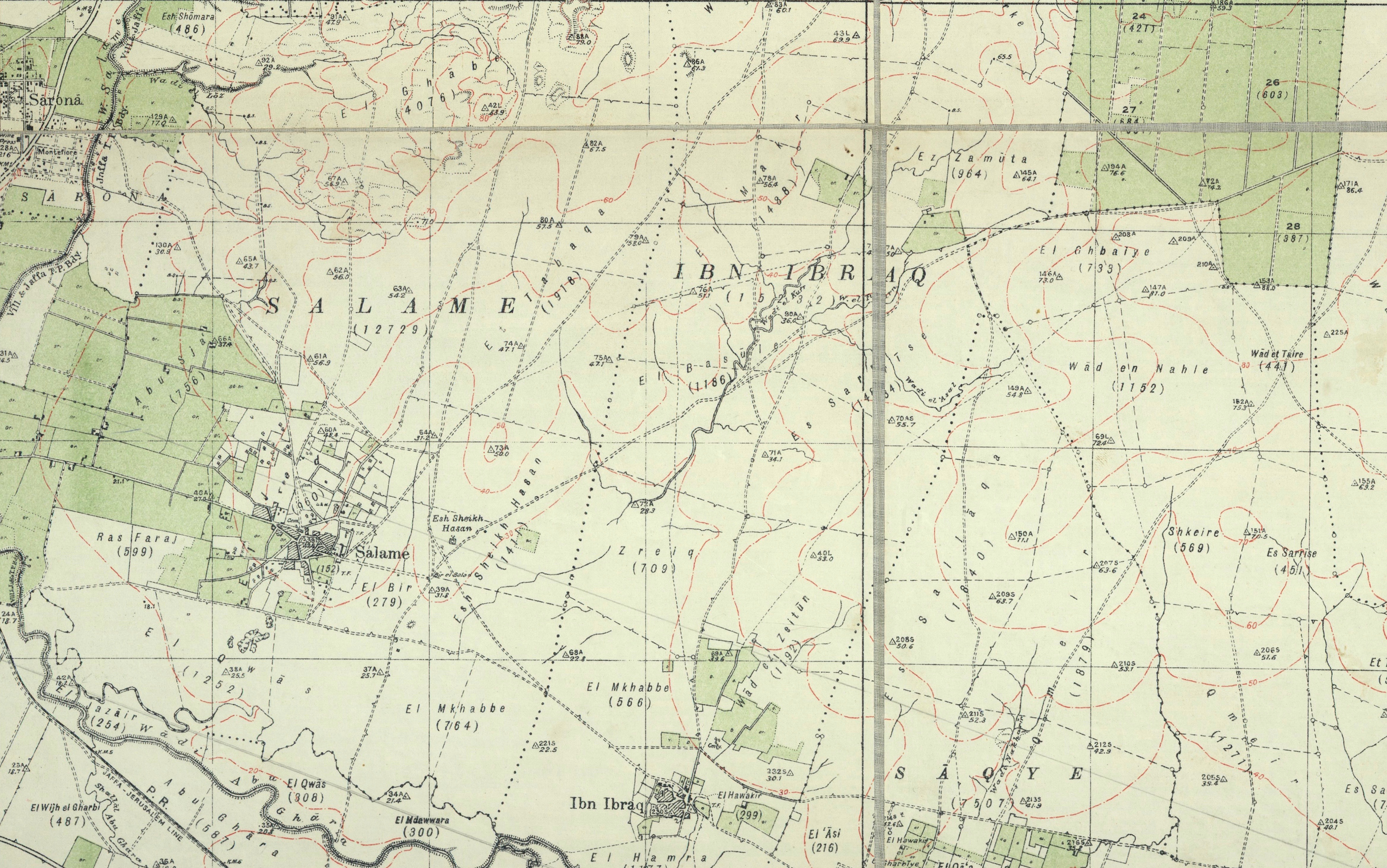
El Kheiriye 1928 (Ibn Ibraq), 1:20,000

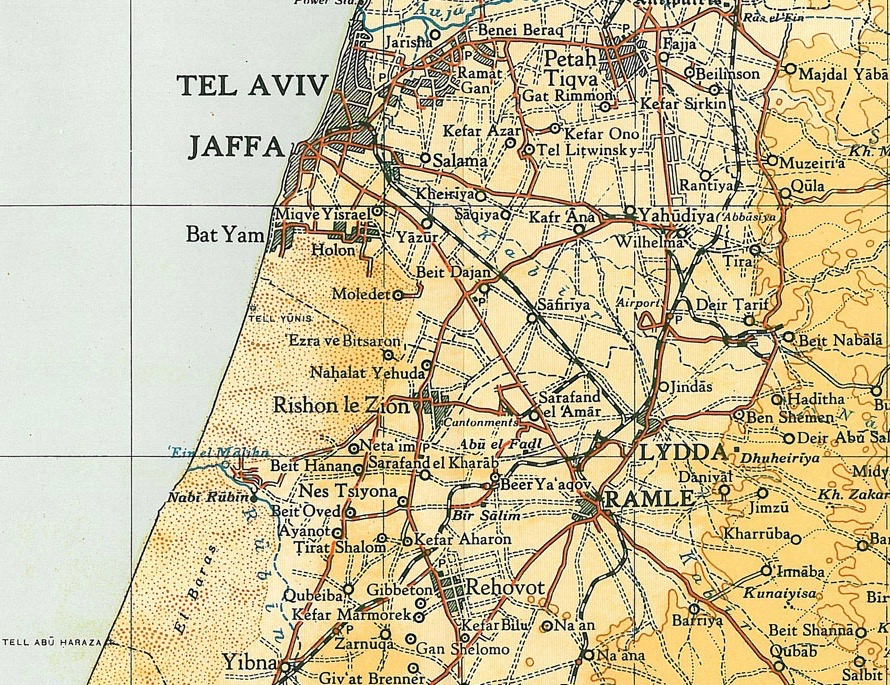
Al-Khayriyya (Kheiriya) 1945 1:250,000

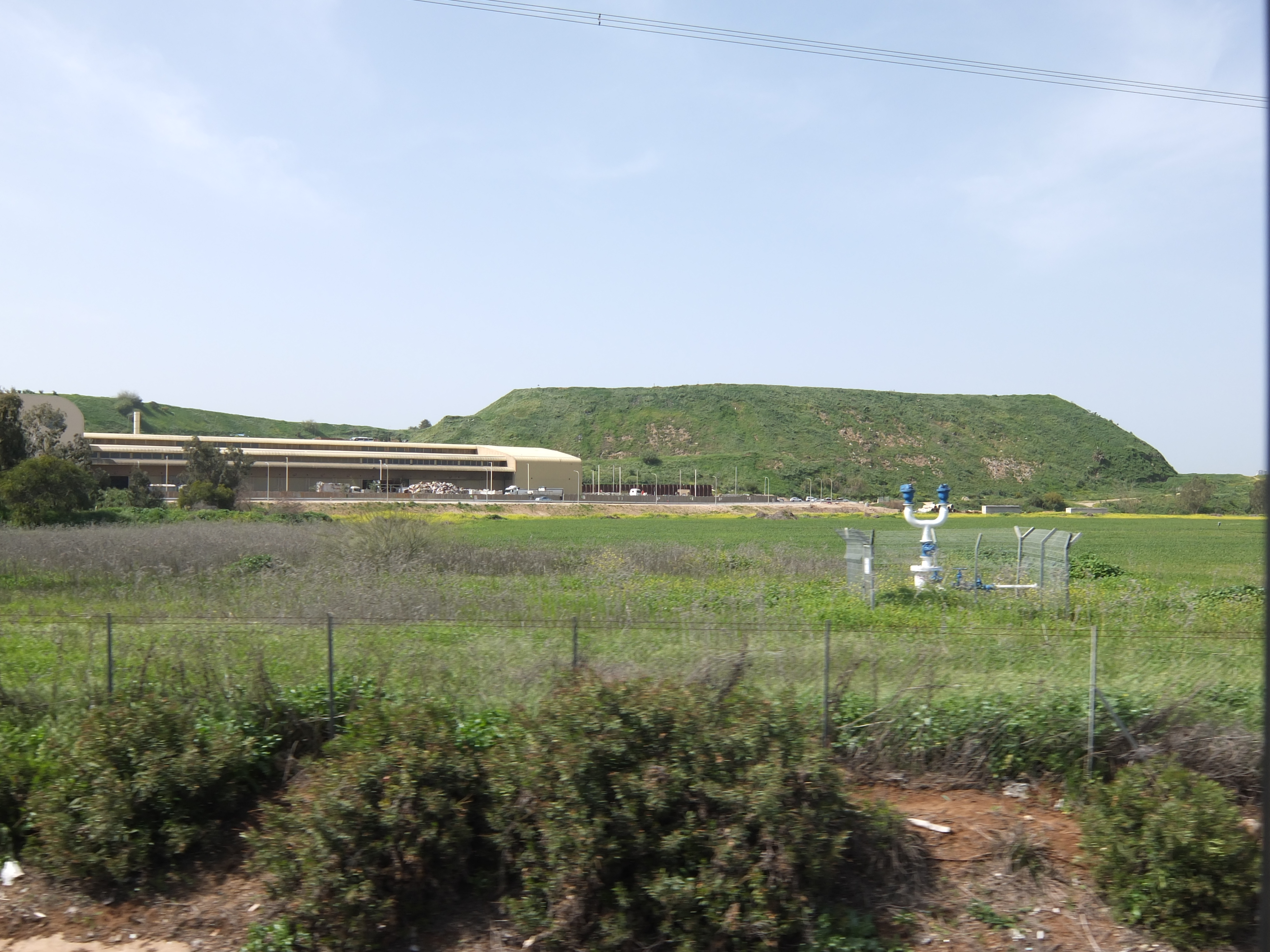
Landfill in Israel, where the old village of Al-Khayriyya once stood

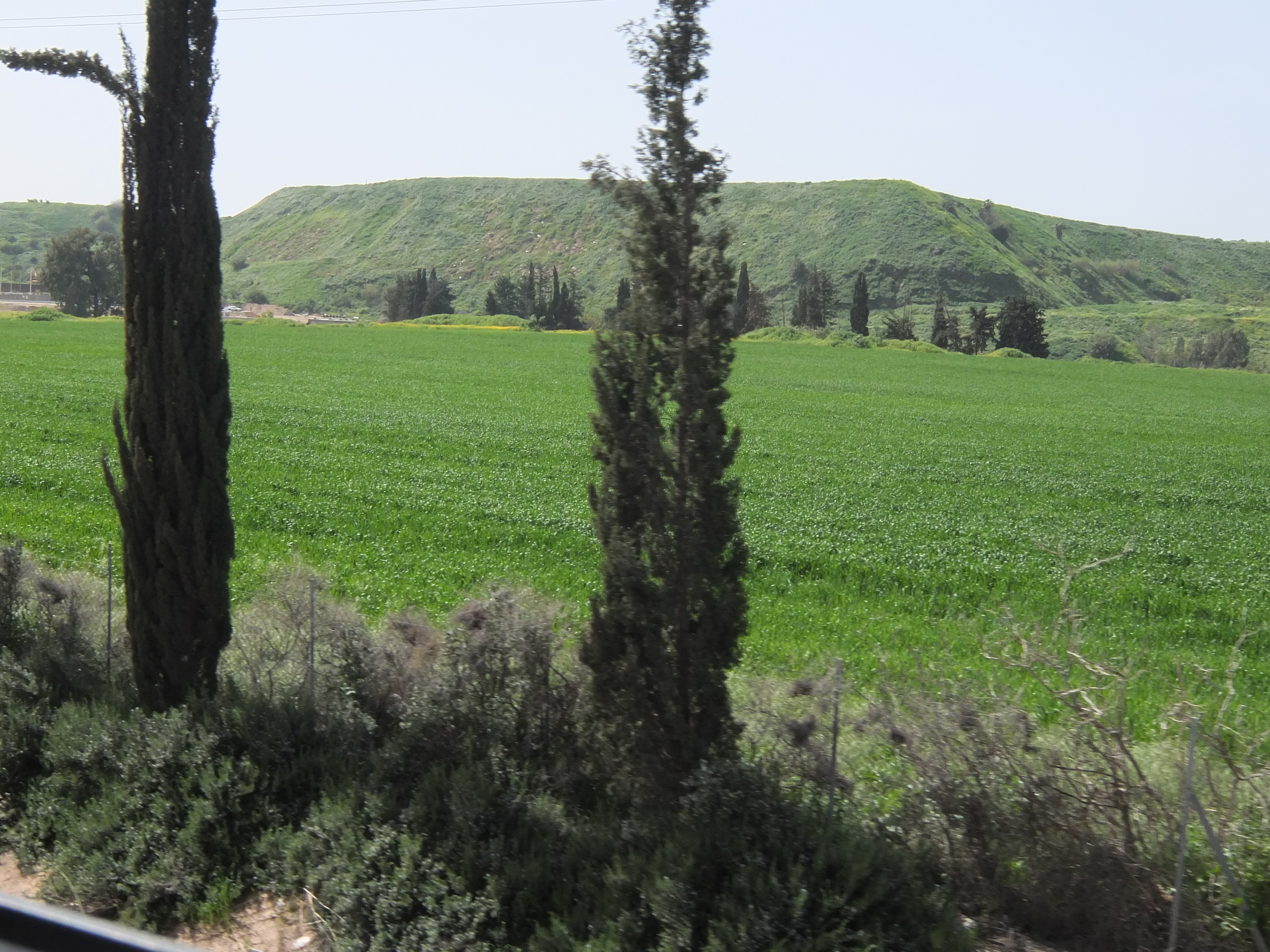
Site of old village (now a landfill)

== See also ==
- List of towns and villages depopulated during the 1947–1949 Palestine war

== Bibliography ==
- Barron, J.B., ed. (1923). Palestine: Report and General Abstracts of the Census of 1922. Government of Palestine.
- Cancik, Hubert, P. Schäfer and Hermann Lichtenberger (1996), Geschichte-Tradition-Reflexion: Festschrift Für Martin Hengel Zum 70. Geburtstag. Mohr Siebeck. ISBN 3-16-146675-6
- Conder, C.R. (1875). "Mediævel Topography of Palestine". Quarterly Statement - Palestine Exploration Fund. 7: 89–94.
- Conder, C.R.; Kitchener, H.H. (1882). The Survey of Western Palestine: Memoirs of the Topography, Orography, Hydrography, and Archaeology. Vol. 2. London: Committee of the Palestine Exploration Fund.
- Dauphin, C. (1998). La Palestine byzantine, Peuplement et Populations. BAR International Series 726 (in French). Vol. III : Catalogue. Oxford: Archeopress. ISBN 0-860549-05-4.
- Freedman, D.N.; Myers, Allen C. (2000). Eerdmans Dictionary of the Bible. Amsterdam University Press. ISBN 978-90-5356-503-2.
- Government of Palestine, Department of Statistics (1945). Village Statistics, April, 1945.
- Hadawi, S. (1970). Village Statistics of 1945: A Classification of Land and Area ownership in Palestine. Palestine Liberation Organization Research Center. Archived from the original on 2018-12-08.
- Hartmann, M. (1883). "Die Ortschaftenliste des Liwa Jerusalem in dem türkischen Staatskalender für Syrien auf das Jahr 1288 der Flucht (1871)". Zeitschrift des Deutschen Palästina-Vereins. 6: 102–149.
- Hütteroth, W.-D.; Abdulfattah, K. (1977). Historical Geography of Palestine, Transjordan and Southern Syria in the Late 16th Century. Erlanger Geographische Arbeiten, Sonderband 5. Erlangen, Germany: Vorstand der Fränkischen Geographischen Gesellschaft. ISBN 3-920405-41-2.
- Khalidi, W. (1992). All That Remains: The Palestinian Villages Occupied and Depopulated by Israel in 1948. Washington D.C.: Institute for Palestine Studies. ISBN 0-88728-224-5.
- Mills, E., ed. (1932). Census of Palestine 1931. Population of Villages, Towns and Administrative Areas. Jerusalem: Government of Palestine.
- Morris, B. (2004). The Birth of the Palestinian Refugee Problem Revisited. Cambridge University Press. ISBN 0-521-00967-7.
- Palmer, E.H. (1881). The Survey of Western Palestine: Arabic and English Name Lists Collected During the Survey by Lieutenants Conder and Kitchener, R. E. Transliterated and Explained by E.H. Palmer. Committee of the Palestine Exploration Fund.
- Sharon, M. (2013). Corpus Inscriptionum Arabicarum Palaestinae, H-I. Vol. 5. BRILL. ISBN 978-90-04-25097-0.
- Socin, A. (1879). "Alphabetisches Verzeichniss von Ortschaften des Paschalik Jerusalem". Zeitschrift des Deutschen Palästina-Vereins. 2: 135–163.
