= Hermann Lichtenberger (theologian) =

German theologian

- Born: 15 May 1943; Vrbas
- Education: University of Tübingen, Marburg University
- Occupation: Theologian
- Employer: University of Tübingen

Hermann Lichtenberger is a German protestant theologian who is considered one of the better-known German New Testament scholars. His research interests are: New Testament in its Jewish and pagan context; Dead Sea Scrolls, Apocrypha and Pseudepigrapha.

== Life ==
Lichtenberger was born on May 25, 1943 in Neu-Werbass, Batschka, then Hungary, and is the son of Theodor and Marianne Lichtenberger. Lichtenberger has been married since June 18, 1968 and has two children.

=== Education ===
From 1964 to 1970, Lichtenberger studied Protestant theology and Semitic languages at the University of Erlangen and the University of Heidelberg. From 1966 to 1970 he worked as a student assistant at the Qumran Research Center in Heidelberg, from 1970 to 1973 he was a research assistant there. From 1973 to 1977 he held the same position at the Qumran Research Center in Marburg. He was awarded his doctorate in Marburg in 1974 with a thesis on studies on the image of man in texts of the Qumran community entitled Studien zum Menschenbild in Texten der Qumrangemeinde. From 1977 to 1986, he was research assistant to the New Testament scholar Martin Hengel and deputy director at the Institute for Ancient Judaism and Hellenistic Religious History at the Eberhard Karls University of Tübingen. He completed his habilitation at the University of Tübingen in 1986 under the title Studien zur paulinischen Anthropologie in Römer 7.

=== Teaching ===
From 1986 to 1988, he held a deputy position and taught Biblical Theology in Bayreuth. From 1988 to 1993, he was Professor of Jewish Studies and New Testament at the Westfälische Wilhelms-Universität in Münster and Director of the Institutum Judaicum Delitzschianum. From 1993 to the winter semester 2011/2012, he was Professor of New Testament and Ancient Judaism at the Protestant Theological Faculty of the University of Tübingen and Director of the Institute for Ancient Judaism and Hellenistic Religious History. He was editor of the Hebrew text, the English translation and commentary of the Hodayot (German: Loblieder) from Qumran Caves 1 and 4; and he collaborated on GRK 354: The Bible - Its Development and Reception (German: Die Bibel - Entwicklung und Wirkung).

== Festschrift ==
- Ulrike Mittmann-Richert, ed. (2003). Der Mensch vor Gott. Forschungen zum Menschenbild in Bibel, antikem Judentum und Koran; Festschrift für Hermann Lichtenberger zum 60. Geburtstag. Neukirchener Verlag, Neukirchen-Vluyn. ISBN 3-7887-2000-X.
- Festschrift für Walter Klaiber zum 65. Geburtstag, emk Studien 7, Stuttgart. 2005. pp. 9–14.

== Works ==
=== Theses ===
- Lichtenberger, Hermann (1974). Studien zum Menschenbild in Texten der Qumrangemeinde (PhD Thesis. Marburg).
- Lichtenberger, Hermann (2004). Das Ich Adams und das Ich der Menschheit: Studien zum Menschenbild in Römer 7. Wissenschaftliche Untersuchungen zum Neuen Testament, ISSN 0512-1604. Mohr Siebeck. ISBN 9783161482762.

=== Books ===
- Lichtenberger, Hermann (2013). Die Apokalypse. Kohlhammer Verlag. ISBN 9783170287976.

== Sources ==
- Schnackertz, Hermann Josef; Brugger, René (2011). Radikalität: religiöse, politische und künstlerische Radikalismen in Geschichte und Gegenwart. Königshausen & Neumann. ISBN 9783826046360.
- Pilger, Tanja; Witte, Markus, eds. (2012). Mazel tov: Interdisziplinäre Beiträge zum Verhältnis von Christentum und Judentum. Festschrift anlässlich des 50. Geburtstages des Instituts Kirche und Judentum. Studien zu Kirche und Israel. Vol. 1. Evangelische Verlagsanstalt. ISBN 9783374036691.
- Ring, Hermann Ha; Metz, Johann Baptist (1993). Reincarnation Or Resurrection?. SCM Press. ISBN 9780883448731.
- "Hermann Lichtenberger".
- Evangelisch-Theologische Fakultät. "Prof. Dr. Hermann Lichtenberger".
- "Professor Dr. Hermann Lichtenberger". Deutsche Forschungsgemeinschaft.
- "Hermann Lichtenberger. Das Ich Adams und das Ich der Menschheit". Mohr Siebeck.
