= Operation Hametz =

Zionist paramilitary operation in the 1948 Palestine war

- Part of the Plan Dalet, the Civil War in Mandatory Palestine, and the Jewish insurgency in Mandatory Palestine
Date	25–30 April 1948
Location	Jaffa and surrounding area, Mandatory Palestine
Result	Yishuv victory; British intervention temporarily halts offensive towards Jaffa; Failed British attempt to retake Manshiya
Territorial changes	Jewish conquest of Saqiya, Kafr 'Ana, Al-Khayriyya, Yazur, Bayt Dajan, Al-Safiriyya, Al-'Abbasiyya and Manshiya

Belligerents
(Israel) Yishuv; Irgun; Haganah	Arab Liberation Army	United Kingdom

Commanders and leaders
Menachem Begin; Amichai Paglin	Unknown	Gordon MacMillan

Casualties and losses
Irgun: 42 killed, ~400 wounded	Unknown	1 killed Several tanks destroyed

Operation Hametz (Hebrew: מבצע חמץ, Mivtza Hametz; 25–30 April 1948) was an operation to conquer Jaffa and towns around it conducted by the Irgun and the Haganah shortly before the termination of the British Mandate for Palestine, in the civil war phase of the 1948 Palestine war. The operation which led to the first direct battle between the British and the Irgun, was seen as a great victory for the latter, and enabled the Irgun to take credit for the complete conquest of Jaffa that happened on May 13. While the Haganah had no prior warning of the attack, some historians have argued that the operation constituted part of their Plan Dalet.

The battle was the first and only time that the British became heavily involved in fighting between the Jews and the Arabs during the 1948 Palestine war.

== Background ==
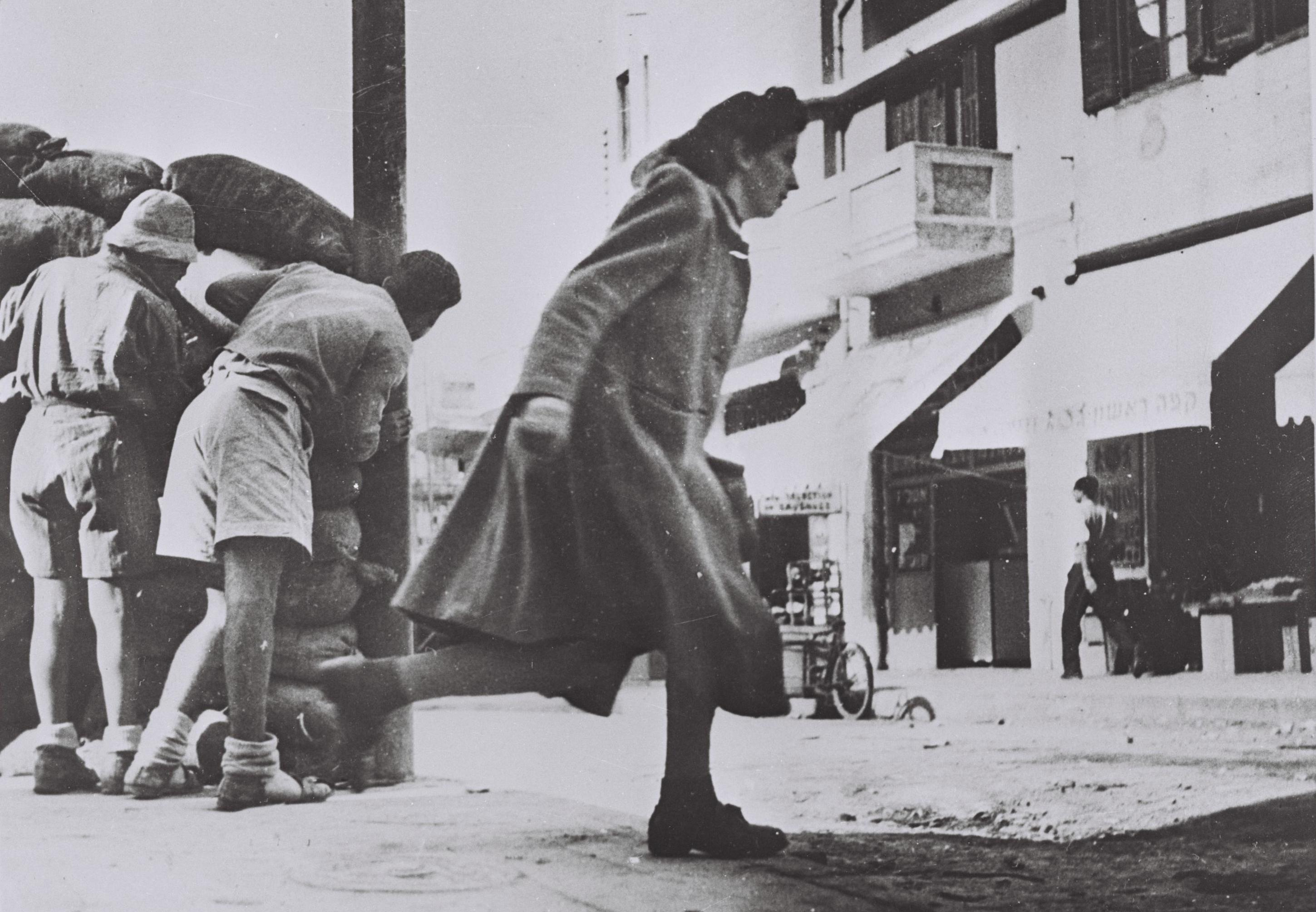
Tel Aviv residents taking cover at the Carmel market from Arab snipers shooting from the Hassan Bek Mosque of Jaffa (February 1948)

Following the 29 November 1947 United Nations resolution to partition Palestine into Jewish and Arab states, a civil war erupted between the Arab and Jewish communities of Palestine. With the start of the war, an Arab mob attacked Tel Aviv from Jaffa, burning and looting while pushing toward Allenby Street. The Haganah and Irgun repelled the attack. Sniper fire was exchanged by both Jewish and Arab fighters between Jaffa and Tel Aviv. Up to the start of the operation Arab sniper fire from Jaffa into Tel Aviv inflicted approximately 1,000 casualties. During this time, 30,000 people left Jaffa, leaving a population of between 50,000 and 60,000. The British Mandate for Palestine was to terminate on 15 May 1948.

== The operation ==
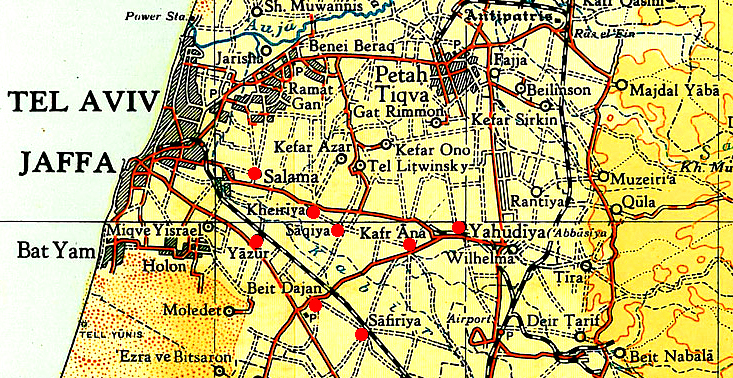
Villages captured during Operation Hametz

On the morning of 25 April 1948 the Jewish paramilitary group Irgun launched a full-scale attack on Jaffa from Tel Aviv. The Irgun troops were commanded by Amichai Paglin. Israeli historians maintain that the Haganah (another Jewish paramilitary group from which the Irgun had split off) had no prior warning of the attack but soon after its start the Haganah and the Irgun came to an agreement whereby the Irgun troops would be under the command of local Haganah commanders. The operation involved attacks from the north by the Alexandroni Brigade and by the Givati Brigade from the south. They met little or no resistance. The Irgun captured the neighborhood of Manshiya. The Kiryati Brigade failed in its assault on the southern Jaffa suburb of Tel al-Rish.

According to LeBor on the attack on Jaffa:

Amichai Paglin, known as Gidi, commanded the attack. Paglin had masterminded the bombing of the British military headquarters in Jerusalem's King David Hotel, when 91 people were killed, including 15 Jews. His instructions to his troops were unequivocal—they were "to prevent constant military traffic in the city, to break the spirit of the enemy troops, to cause chaos among the civilian population in order to create a mass flight."

The Irgun offensive opened with a barrage by two mortars, which was to continue throughout the fighting. The mortar barrage lowered morale and caused civilians to flee but did not immediately break the defenses. When the Irgun fighters advanced into Jaffa's Manshiya neighborhood they were pinned down by fierce resistance from Arab militiamen. The Arabs had constructed pillboxes at strategic locations, fired from cover, and were equipped with machine guns. The Irgun fighters eventually managed to capture some houses in room-to-room fighting but did not succeed in advancing far. With the assault bogged down, Irgun commander Menachem Begin began considering an end to offensive operations and only holding what had already been captured, but Paglin persuaded Begin to give him twenty-four hours. Paglin decided to force a corridor to Jaffa's shore by blowing a passage through buildings and constructing sandbag barriers through the streets while using heavy covering fire and explosives. Irgun fighters then began blasting a route towards the sea, advancing gradually. In some instances buildings were blown up to collapse on Arab pillboxes. At times Irgun fighters had to build sandbag walls while lying on their backs under fire and lifting one bag at a time. After around twenty-four hours of work under heavy fire, the Irgun fighters spotted the sea. They then ran out and assaulted an Arab position. The Arabs, realizing what had happened, retreated. With the Manshiya neighborhood cut off, Irgun fighters began clearing out pockets of resistance. Arab militiamen at the Hassan Bek Mosque staged a fierce last stand but it eventually fell. The Irgun secured Manshiya, took the Jaffa railway station, and strengthened their hold on Jerusalem Boulevard. The Irgun mortars that had been shelling Jaffa in support of the assault switched to providing fire support for a faltering Haganah attack.

The offensive alarmed the British. Jewish forces had just captured the Arab areas of Haifa, and as a result, the British government feared for its position in the Middle East, worrying that the Arabs would develop greater antagonism against the British. The British Army was concerned that increased Arab hostility would endanger British troops - British forces were by then evacuating Palestine, and as they used routes that passed through Arab-populated territory, it was feared that withdrawing units could be attacked. British Foreign Secretary Ernest Bevin, upon hearing the news of the start of the offensive, ordered that Jewish forces be prevented from capturing Jaffa, or, if they did capture it, that they be immediately driven out. Within hours of the start of the assault on Jaffa, William Fuller, the British district commissioner for Lydda, asked Israel Rokach, the mayor of Tel Aviv, to call off the attack. Throughout the following two days, Fuller continued asking Rokach to have the attack called off, warning that the British Army would intervene. The British rejected Arab demands to allow Arab Legion units to enter Palestine to defend Jaffa. However, they rushed four battalions of infantry, armor, and naval commandos to Palestine. These reinforcements were meant to free up units already in Palestine to deploy to Jaffa. The British authorities, through Rokach, issued an ultimatum demanding that Irgun forces cease fire and immediately withdraw from Manshiya, threatening to bomb Tel Aviv, and warning that they would "save Jaffa for the Arabs at all costs, especially in light of the fact that the Jews had conquered Haifa". The Irgun rejected the demands. On the same day, the British began a show of force to deter the Jewish assault. Infantry and armor entered Jaffa, with British deploying a total of 4,500 troops in the town. Royal Navy destroyers cruised up and down the Palestinian coast, and Royal Air Force warplanes overflew southern Tel Aviv and Jaffa.

Though most British action was merely demonstrative, they did take limited action. A four-plane formation of Spitfires attacked a Haganah position in Bat Yam. British forces shelled and strafed Irgun positions in Manshiya and sent in armored columns. However, the Irgun resisted. An Irgun bazooka team disabled a British tank and Irgun fighters blew up buildings that collapsed into the streets as the armor advanced. Irgun men also climbed onto the tanks and tossed live dynamite sticks into them. During the fighting an Irgun Bren gun carrier was destroyed by a British tank. Facing heavy resistance, British forces withdrew. One British tank commander and about 20 Irgun fighters were killed in the fighting between the British and Irgun.

Following the battle, the British sent an ultimatum to David Ben-Gurion, threatening to bomb Tel Aviv if he did not rein in the Irgun. As a response, the Irgun threatened to use its mortars to shell the American–German Colony in Jaffa, and declared that it was up to the British whether their departure from Palestine - already in its finishing stage - would be peaceful or bloody.

News of the British setback compounded the panic that the Irgun mortar barrage had caused. Arab civilians began fleeing to the waterfront en masse to evacuate on boats. Amid the flight of the civilian population civil order collapsed, with shootouts among people who had previous disputes, looting, and fires.

On 29 April, British commanders met with Ben-Gurion's son Amos and Jaffa mayor Yousef Haikal. An agreement was worked out, under which Operation Hametz would be stopped and the Haganah would not attack Jaffa until the end of the Mandate. The British dropped the demand for a complete withdrawal of Jewish forces from Manshiya, and only demanded control of the police station and road access to it. Rather than responding to the British demands, the Irgun blew up the police station as well as several houses, using the debris to block the very road that the British had demanded access to. Afterwards, the Irgun command declared that it was ready to hand over its positions in Manshiya to the Haganah.

On 30 April, the fighting finally came to an end. Jaffa would eventually fall on 13 May, when Haganah forces entered the city.

== Aftermath ==
By 30 April there were about 15,000 to 25,000 people left in Jaffa. The Haganah had complete control of all access into and out of the town, with the exception of a British Army 'presence' at Yazur. They were allowing people to leave the town but subject to searches for weapons. The British Army was escorting civilians to Lydda and al-Ramle. David Ben-Gurion recorded in his diary that when he visited Salama on the evening of 30 April all he found was 'only one old blind woman.' Most of the villages were systematically levelled in the following weeks.

The operation was the largest in the history of the Irgun. Because the Irgun had captured and held the Manshiya neighborhood on its own, it was able to claim much of the credit for the conquest of Jaffa.

== Arab communities captured during Operation Hametz ==
Name	Date	Defending forces	Brigade	Population
Saqiya	25 April 1948	'without a fight'	Alexandroni Brigade	1,100
Kafr 'Ana	29 April 1948	n/a	Alexandroni Brigade	3,020 inc. 220 Jews
al-Khayriyya	29 April 1948	n/a	Alexandroni Brigade	1,420
Salama, Jaffa	29 April 1948	n/a	Alexandroni Brigade; Kiryati & Giv'ati Brigades	6,730
Yazur	30 April 1948	Arab Liberation Army withdrew 28 April	Giv'ati Brigade	4,030
Bayt Dajan	n/a	n/a	Alexandroni Brigade	3,840
Al-Safiriyya	n/a	n/a	Alexandroni Brigade	3,070
Al-'Abbasiyya	4 May 1948 recaptured 11 June finally taken during Operation Dani	n/a	Irgun	5,650 inc. 150 Jews

== See also ==
- Depopulated Palestinian locations in Israel

== Bibliography ==
- Walid Khalidi, All That Remains, ISBN 0-88728-224-5. Uses 1945 census for population figures.
- Benny Morris, The Birth of the Palestinian refugee problem, 1947–1949, ISBN 0-521-33028-9.
