= Rishon LeZion Natural Region =

Coordinates: 31°57′34″N 34°48′06″E

- Natural Region
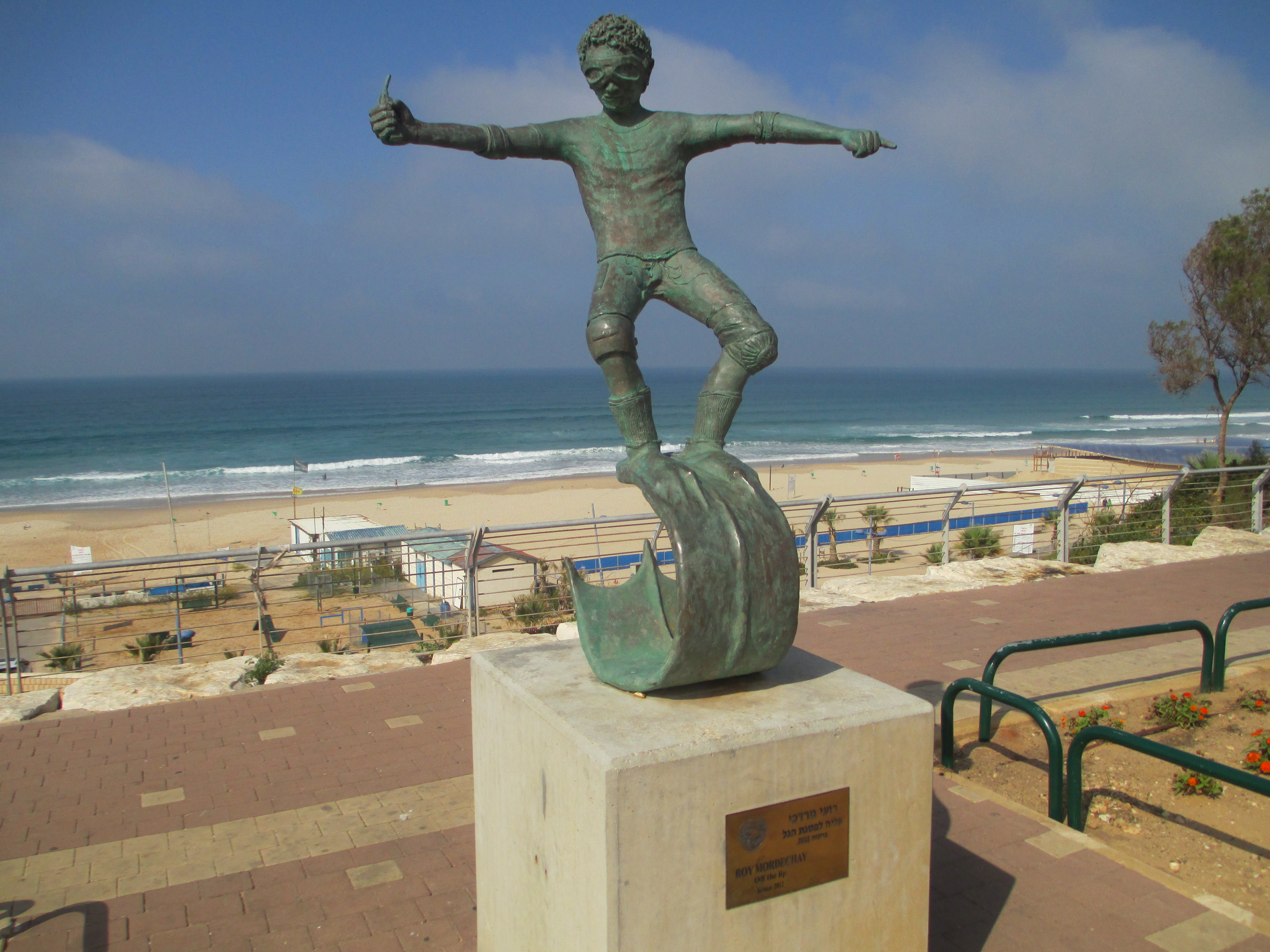
- Sculpture on the beach in Rishon LeZion, the largest city of the Rishon LeZion Natural Region
- Country: Israel
- District: Central
- Subdistrict: Rehovot
- Largest City: Rishon LeZion

Area
  - Total: 117 km^{2} (45 sq mi)

Population (2024)
  - Total: 312,680

Ethnicity
  - Jews and others: 97.6%
  - Arabs: 0.2%

The Rishon LeZion Natural Region or Rishon LeZiyyon Natural Region is a natural region in the Rehovot Subdistrict, in the Central District of Israel. Rishon LeZion is the largest city in the natural region.

== Geography ==
Districts, Subdistricts and Natural Regions of the State of Israel, 2018

The natural region consists of a suburban area on the Israeli coastal plain, between Tel Aviv and Ashdod. It is surrounded by Holon to the north, Be'er Ya'akov to the east and Rehovot and Yavne to the south. It has an area of 117 km^{2}. The largest city in the natural region is Rishon LeZion, which contains 83 percent of the natural region's population. The other major city in the natural region is Ness Ziona. The natural region is coextensive with the Gan Raveh Regional Council.

== Demographics ==
The vast majority of the residents of the Rishon LeZion Natural Region are Jewish. There are no Arab towns in the natural region.

Historical population
Year	Pop.	±%
1972	67,700	—
1983	119,900	+77.1%
1995	188,100	+56.9%
2008	267,550	+42.2%
2022	306,008	+14.4%
2024	312,680	+2.2%

== Administrative local authorities ==
Cities	Local Councils	Villages
Ness Ziona; Rishon LeZion	[None]	Gan Raveh: Ayanot; Beit Hanan; Beit Oved; Gan Sorek; Ge'alya; Irus; Kfar HaNagid; Neta'im; Palmachim

== Voting Patterns ==
In the 2022 election, 52 percent of voters in the natural region voted for the parties of the center-left coalition led by Yair Lapid, while 45 percent voted for the parties of the right-wing coalition led by Benjamin Netanyahu and 0.1 percent voted for the Arab parties.

In the 2026 election, 54 percent of voters in the natural region voted for the parties of the center-left coalition led by Gadi Eisenkot, while 39 percent voted for the parties of the right-wing coalition led by Benjamin Netanyahu and 0.1 percent voted for the Arab parties. An additional 4.5 percent voted for the Reservists, and 1.7 percent voted for Amcha Yisrael. Voter turnout increased 14 percent from the 2022 election.
