= Ada Maimon =

Israeli politician (1893–1973)

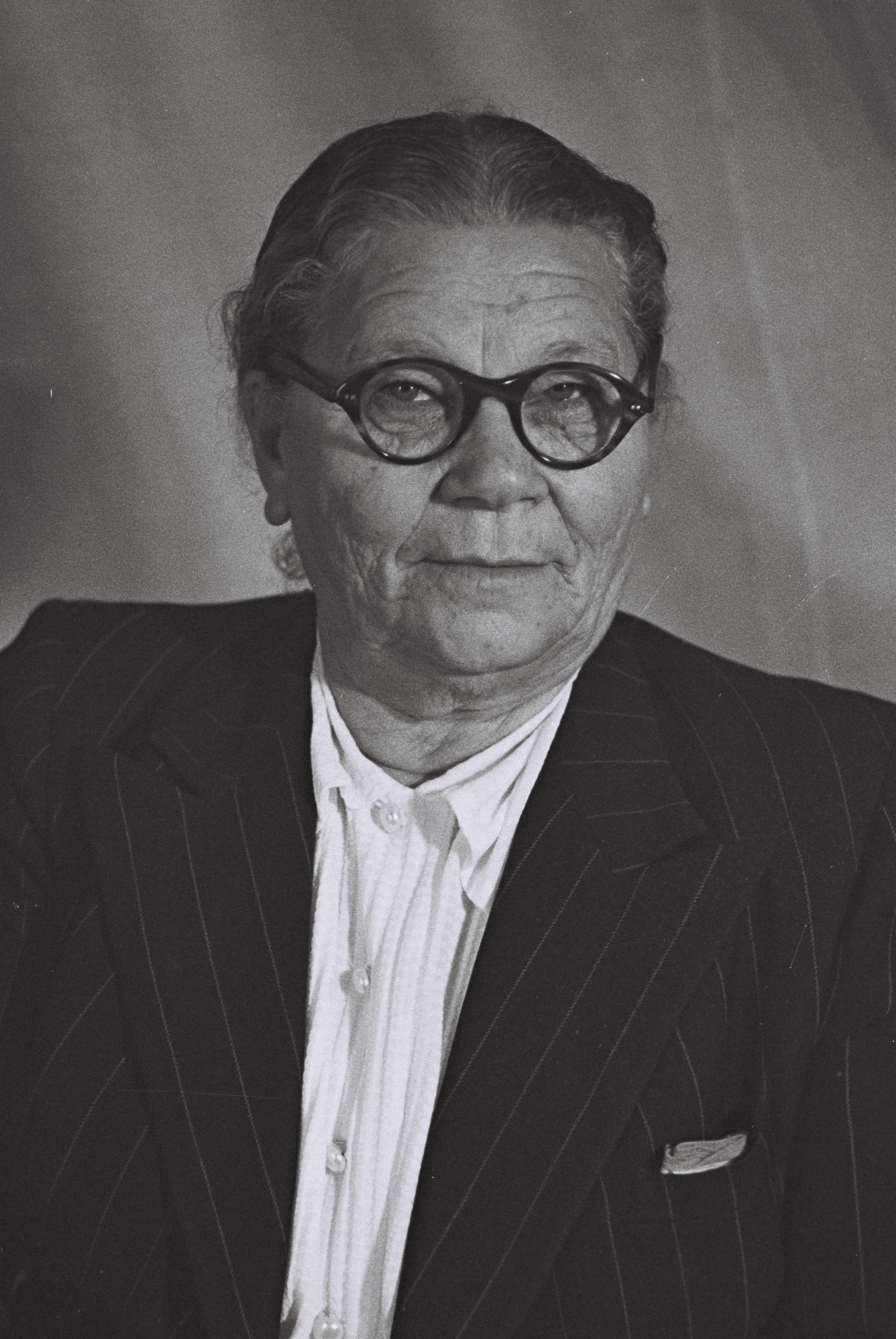
- Maimon in 1951

Faction represented in the Knesset
- 1949–1955: Mapai

Personal details
- Born: 8 October 1893 Mărculești, Russian Empire
- Died: 10 October 1973 (aged 80) Israel
- Relations: Yehuda Leib Maimon (Brother)

Ada Maimon (Hebrew: עדה מימון; 8 October 1893 – 10 October 1973) was an Israeli politician who served as a member of the Knesset for Mapai between 1949 and 1955.

== Biography ==
Born Ada Fishman in Mărculești in Bessarabia Governorate, Russian Empire (now in Moldova), Maimon was one of nine children born to Avraham Elimelekh and Babeh Golda Fishman. She emigrated to Ottoman-controlled Palestine in 1912, and was followed by her older brother, Yehuda the following year. She worked as a teacher, and opened a Hebrew school for girls in Safed. Having joined a youth movement associated with Hapoel Hatzair, she became a member of the Hapoel Hatzair central committee in 1913, remaining on it until 1920.

A participant in its founding convention, she also served on the executive committee of the Histadrut trade union. In 1921 she was amongst the founders of the Women's Workers Movement, and was its secretary until 1930. In that year she established the Ayanot study centre in Ness Ziona.

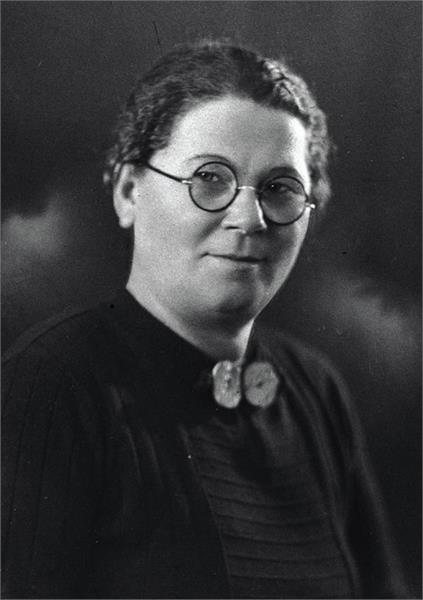
Ada Fishman 1940

Between 1946 and 1947 she served as head of the Histadrut's aliyah department, travelling to displaced persons camps in Germany and Cyprus. In addition, she was a member of the Women's International Zionist Organization's leadership.

Having served as a member of the Assembly of Representatives during the Mandate era, Maimon was elected to the first Knesset on the Mapai list in 1949. She and her brother Yehuda changed their surname to Maimon that year. She was re-elected in 1951, but lost her seat in the 1955 elections. She died on 10 October 1973.

Yehuda was amongst the signatories of the Israeli Israeli Declaration of Independence; he also served as Minister of Religion and War Victims and was a member of the Knesset for the United Religious Front between 1949 and 1951.
