= Settlement of the Thousand =

Zionist plans to colonize Palestine

The Settlement of the Thousand (Hebrew: התיישבות האלף, Hityashvut HaElef) refers to two separate Zionist plans to settle Jewish families on farms in Mandate Palestine. The first started in September 1926, the second in 1932. The aim of both plans was to settle 1,000 families on agricultural lots.

== 1932 scheme ==
The 1932 plan was a response to the 1929 Palestine riots, and aimed to establish small agricultural settlements around the larger Jewish towns and moshavot and help defend them against Arab rioters. The first takers of the deal generally received a modest home and around 15 dunams of land. Although only 437 families were settled in the end, it resulted in the creation of several moshavim, including Avihayil, Beit Oved, Gibton, Givat Hen, Kfar Bilu, Kfar Hess and Neta'im.

== See also ==
- Tower and stockade
