= Gan Raveh Regional Council =

Coordinates: 31°55′N 34°46′E

Gan Raveh גן רווה
- Regional council (from 1952)
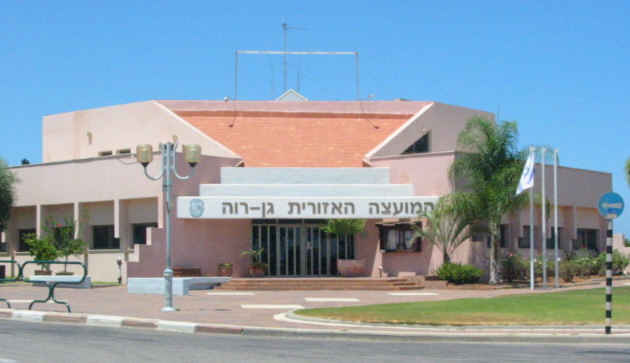
- Interactive map of Gan Raveh
- Country: Israel
- District: Central
- Subdistrict: Rehovot
- Natural region: Rishon LeZion

Government
  - Head of Municipality: Mira Ben Ari

Area
  - Total: 42,000 dunams (42 km^{2}; 16 sq mi)

Population (2024)
  - Total: 6,137
  - Density: 150/km^{2} (380/sq mi)
- Website: Official website

Gan Raveh Regional Council (Hebrew: מועצה אזורית גן רווה, Mo'atza Ezorit Gan Raveh) is a regional council in the Central Coastal Plain region of the Central District of Israel. The council's area of jurisdiction extends to nine settlements: a kibbutz, six moshavim, a community settlement and a youth village. In 2024 the total population was 6,137. The council serves Ayanot, Beit Hanan, Beit Oved, Ge'alya, Gan Sorek, Irus, Kfar HaNagid, Neta'im, and Palmachim. 'Gan Raveh' means well-watered garden and these are words in a biblical verse of Isaiah, which are reproduced on the signs of some of the council's villages, including Ayanot.

The head of the local council is Mira Ben Ari. The council's headquarters are located in the youth village of Ayanot.

== Demographics ==
Historical population
Year	Pop.	±%
1972	1,700	—
1983	2,400	+41.2%
1995	2,700	+12.5%
2008	4,650	+72.2%
2022	5,975	+28.5%
2024	6,137	+2.7%

== Voting Patterns ==
In the 2022 election, 78 percent of voters in the regional council voted for the parties of the center-left coalition led by Yair Lapid, while 22 percent voted for the parties of the right-wing coalition led by Benjamin Netanyahu and 0.2 percent voted for the Arab parties.

In the 2026 election, 75 percent of voters in the regional council voted for the parties of the center-left coalition led by Gadi Eisenkot, while 19 percent voted for the parties of the right-wing coalition led by Benjamin Netanyahu and 0.3 percent voted for the Arab parties. An additional 4.1 percent voted for the Reservists, and 1.2 percent voted for Amcha Yisrael. Voter turnout increased 17 percent from the 2022 election.
