= Gan Sorek =

Moshav in central Israel

Gan Sorek: גַּן שׂוֹרֵק (Hebrew)
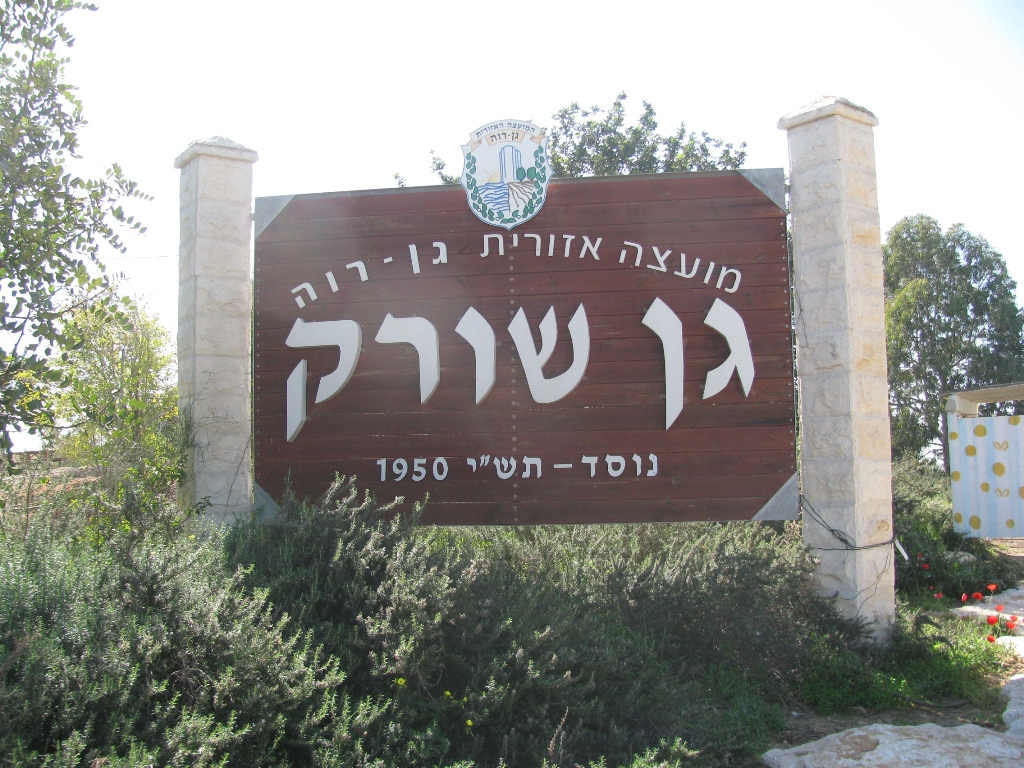

- Location within Central Israel
- Coordinates: 31°56′39″N 34°45′36″E
- Country: Israel
- District: Central
- Subdistrict: Rehovot
- Council: Gan Raveh
- Affiliation: Moshavim Movement
- Founded: 1950
- Founder: Polish and Romanian Jews
- Population (2024): 322

Gan Sorek (Hebrew: גַּן שׂוֹרֵק, lit. 'Sorek Garden') is a moshav in central Israel. Located in the coastal plain, approximately four kilometres southwest of Rishon LeZion and covering 700 dunams, it falls under the jurisdiction of Gan Raveh Regional Council. In 2024 it had a population of 322.

== History ==
The moshav was founded in 1950 by Jewish immigrants from Poland and Romania on land near the depopulated Palestinian village of Nabi Rubin, and was named after the nearby Nahal Sorek.

== Archaeology ==
=== Gan Sorek North ===
Several archaeological sites were discovered around the moshav. One of them, "Gan Sorek North", was a Hellenistic-era village of more than 30 dunams, reaching its largest extent in the early 2nd century BCE. As many as seventeen buildings (including houses and stores) were excavated, most of them laid out around a central courtyard. A cemetery was discovered south of the houses, and an industrial zone to their east and northeast.

Finds include imported tableware, amphorae, glass beads, and 420 Hellenistic coins of various types and mints. The many Rhodian amphorae show that residents drank imported wine. A large group of coins from Side in Pamphylia (in southern Anatolia) could indicate that the inhabitants were settlers from abroad.

Based on the findings, archaeologist Uzi 'Ad suggests that the village was a military colony, likely a katoikia settled by the families of Greek or Anatolian veterans (or both). The site was abandoned in the mid-2nd century BCE, possibly due to the expansion of Judea into the coastal area under the Jewish Hasmonean rulers Jonathan and Simon.

=== Gan Sorek South ===
Another site, "Gan Sorek South" was a single large Hellenistic-era farmstead on a hilltop about 400 meters southwest of "Gan Sorek North". Coins indicate it was founded during the last third of the 3rd century BCE and inhabited through the first half of the 2nd century BCE. The main house, built mainly of mudbrick, had three or four wings of rooms and halls around a central courtyard. Clay ovens, grinding stones were found inside the house. A pottery kiln, a storehouse and hearths were found to its east. Five winepresses were found to the west, south and east of the house. Their combined capacity is estimated at about 80,000 liters per season.
