= Ge'alya =

Moshav in central Israel

Ge'alya: גְּאַלְיָה (Hebrew)
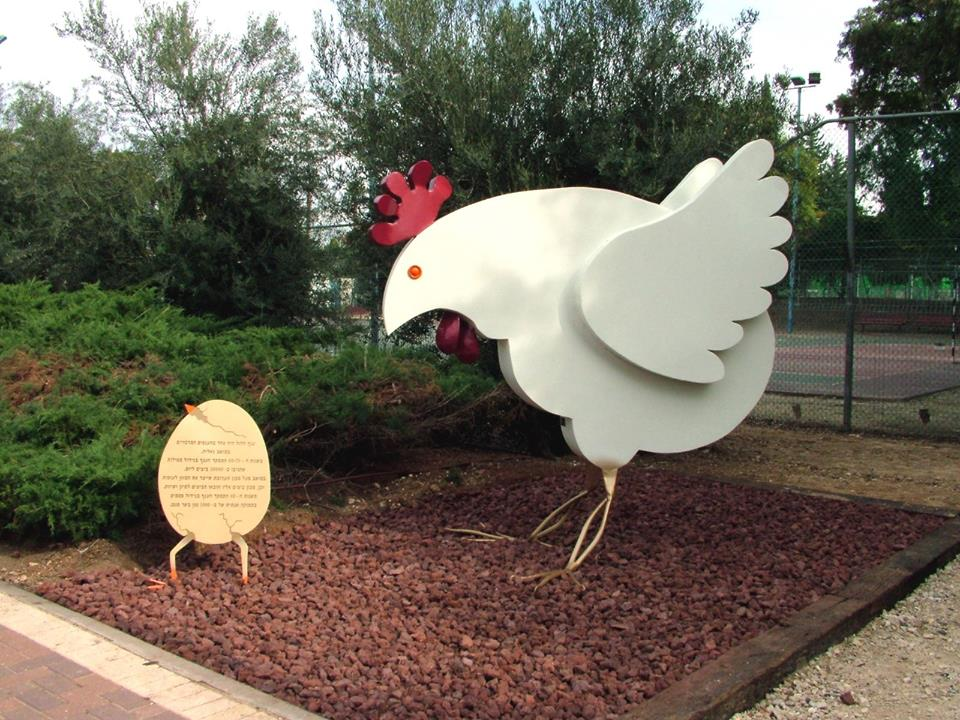

- Location within Central Israel
- Coordinates: 31°53′6″N 34°45′58″E
- Country: Israel
- District: Central
- Subdistrict: Rehovot
- Council: Gan Raveh
- Affiliation: Moshavim Movement
- Founded: 1948
- Founder: Bulgarian Jews
- Population (2024): 1,094
- Website: www.gealya.co.il

Ge'alya, sometimes written Galia (Hebrew: גְּאַלְיָה), is a moshav in central Israel. Located in the coastal plain and covering 2,000 dunams, it falls under the jurisdiction of Gan Raveh Regional Council. In 2024 it had a population of 1,094.

== History ==
The moshav was founded in 1948 by immigrants from Bulgaria.

It is located south of the ancient site of Tel Shalaf, where Iron Age artifacts have been found. Tel Shalaf, is identified by some but not all scholars with the city of Eltekeh. Eltekeh appeared in Sennacherib's Annals as the site of a battle between the Assyrians and Egyptians in 701 BCE, and in the Bible as a Levitical city within the first Dan tribal area (Joshua 19:44 and Joshua 21:23).
