= Beit Hanan =

Moshav in central Israel

Beit Hanan: בֵּית חָנָן (Hebrew); بيت حنان (Arabic)
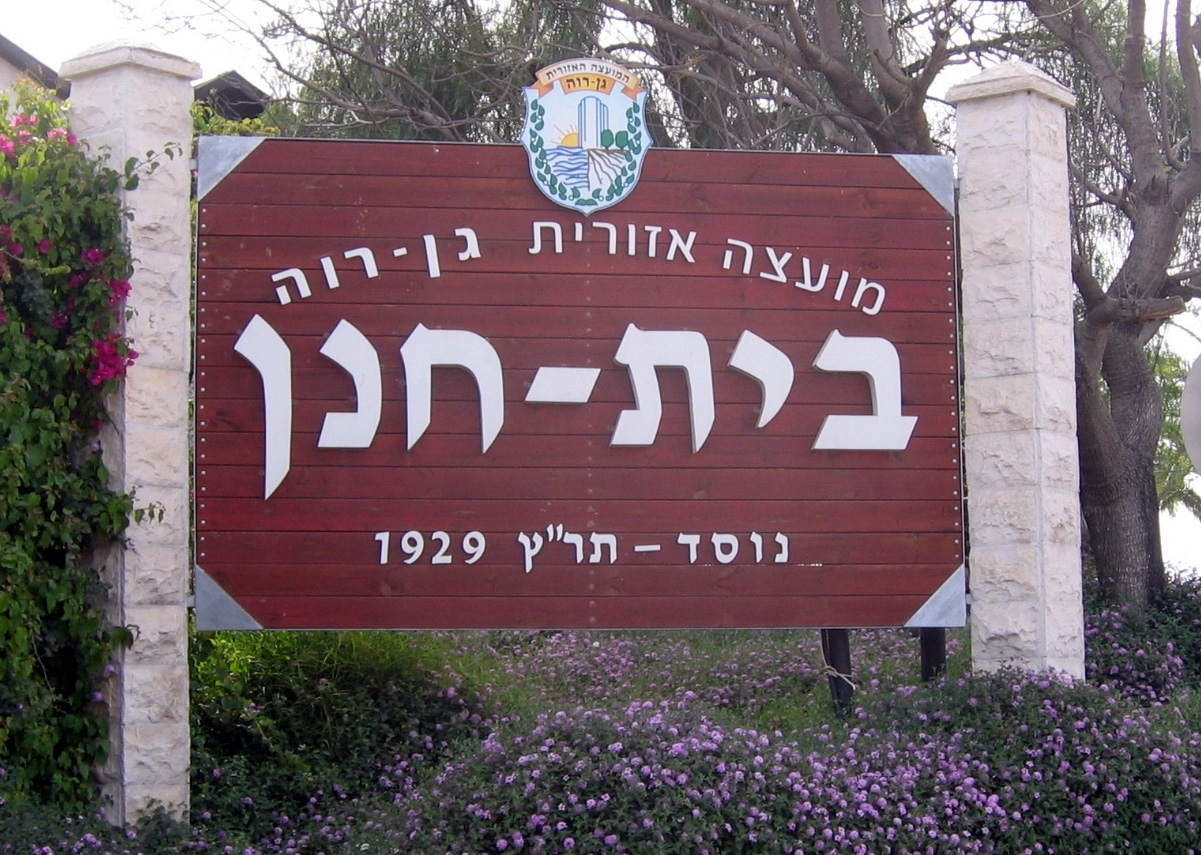

- Location within Central Israel Location within Israel
- Coordinates: 31°56′4″N 34°46′22″E
- Country: Israel
- District: Central
- Subdistrict: Rehovot
- Council: Gan Raveh
- Affiliation: Moshavim Movement
- Founded: 1929
- Founder: Bulgarian Jews
- Population (2024): 632

Beit Hanan (Hebrew: בֵּית חָנָן) is a moshav in central Israel. Located around two kilometers west of Ness Ziona, it falls under the jurisdiction of Gan Raveh Regional Council. In 2024 its population was 632.

== History ==
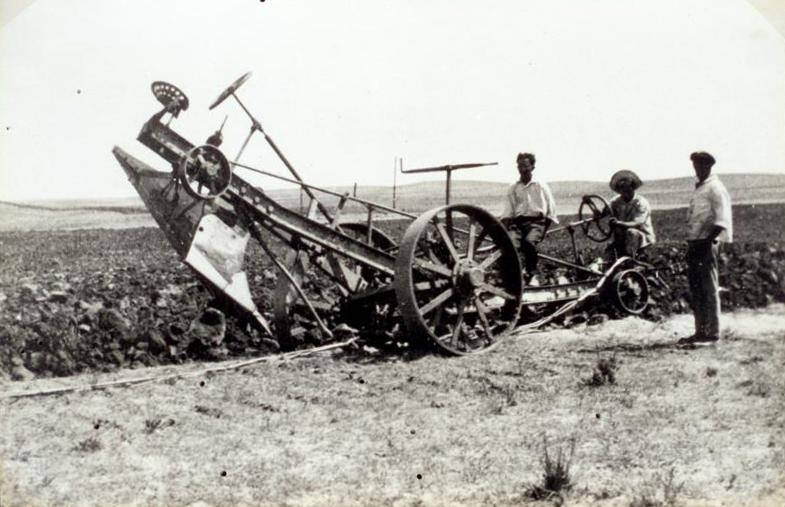
Bit Hanan, 1929

Beit Hanan founded during the Hanukkah holiday of 1929 by Jewish immigrants from Bulgaria, Beit Hanan was the first Jewish agricultural community to be established after the 1929 Palestine riots. The name is taken from the Bible, specifically (1 Kings 4:9). According to a census conducted in 1931 by the British Mandate authorities, Beit Hanan had a population of 178 inhabitants, in 50 houses.

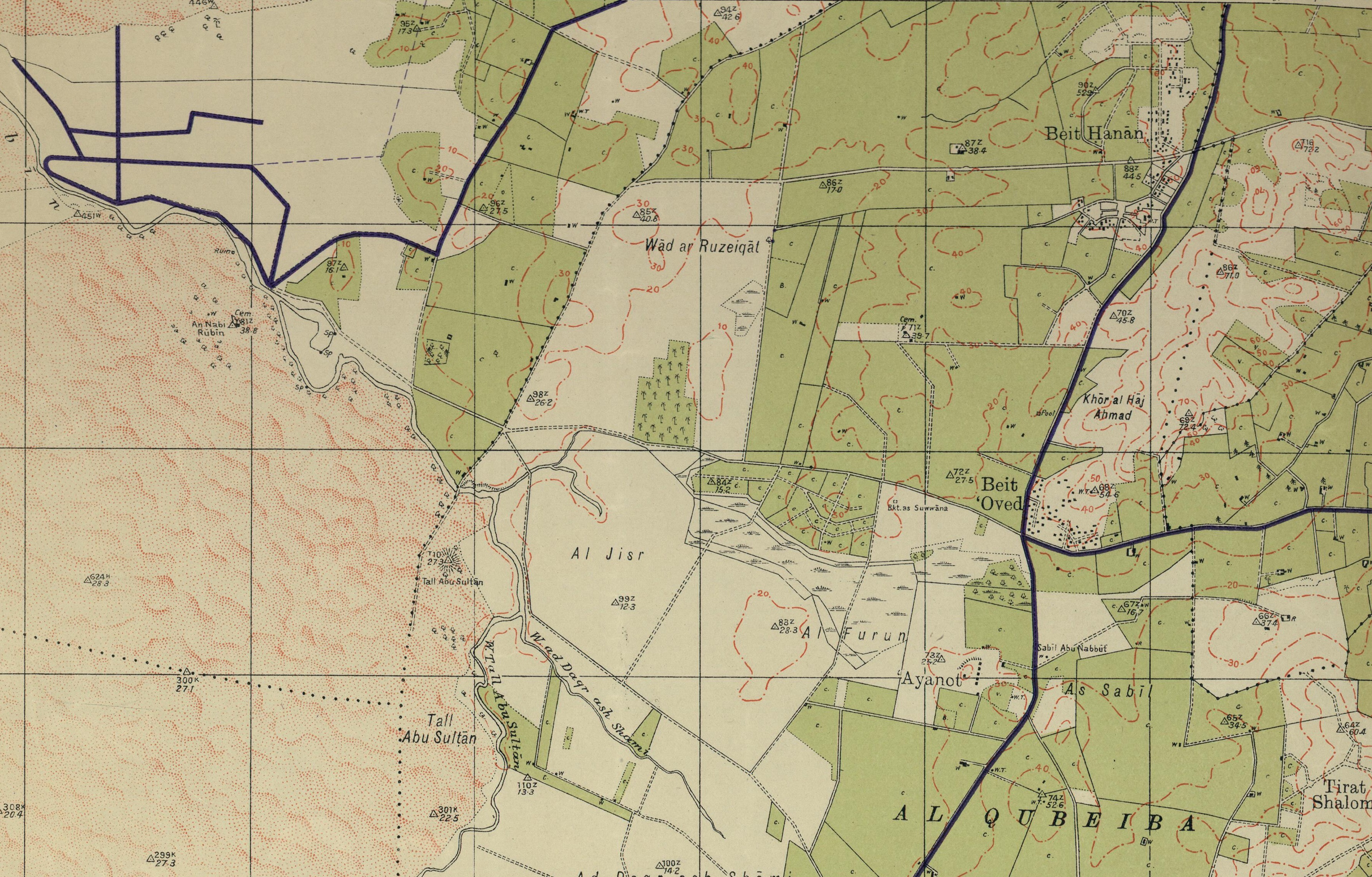
Beit Hanan 1941 1:20,000

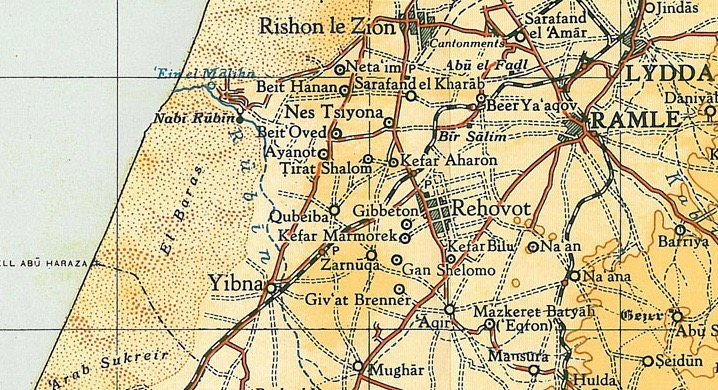
Beit Hanan 1945 1:250,000

In 2007, Beit Hanan had 750 acres (3.0 km^{2}) of farmland. The main economic branches are eggs, orchards (pecan, citrus, avocado, mango, anona and olives) and greenhouses (flowers, vegetables and seedlings). The moshav also has banquet facilities on the grounds of a historic home.

A Greek-inscribed mosaic floor was discovered within the boundaries of the moshav. A rare species of red iris grows west of the moshav, in a wild flower reserve stretching over 8 acres (32,000 m^{2}).

== Gallery ==
=== Beginning ===
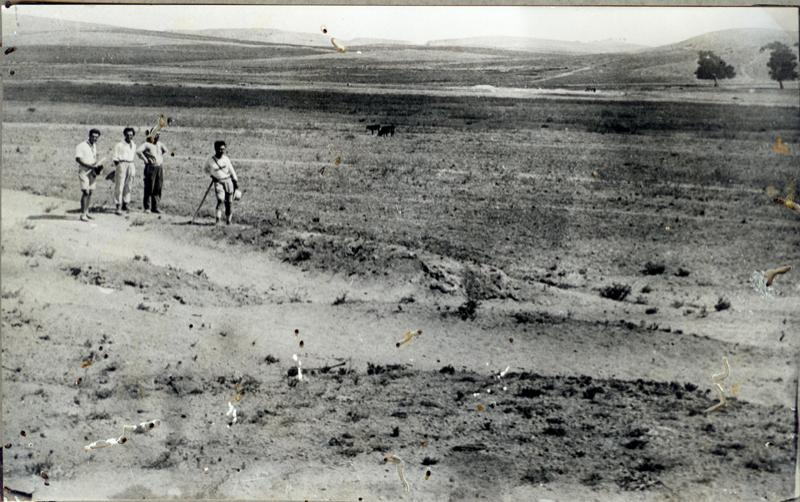
Surveying Kubeiba land intended for settling Beit Hanan, 1928

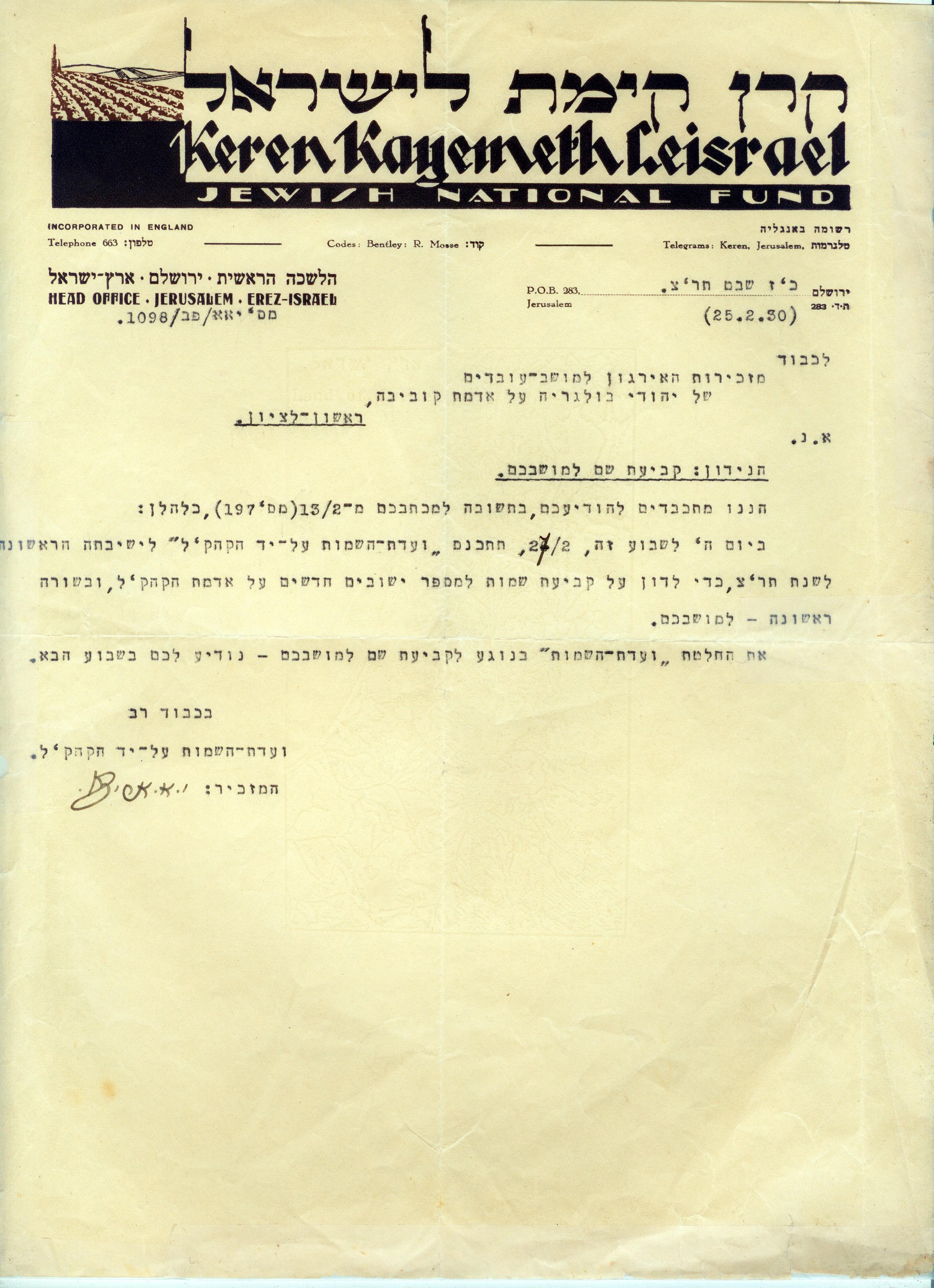
A document dealing with the name of Beit Hanan Yishuv, 25 February 1930

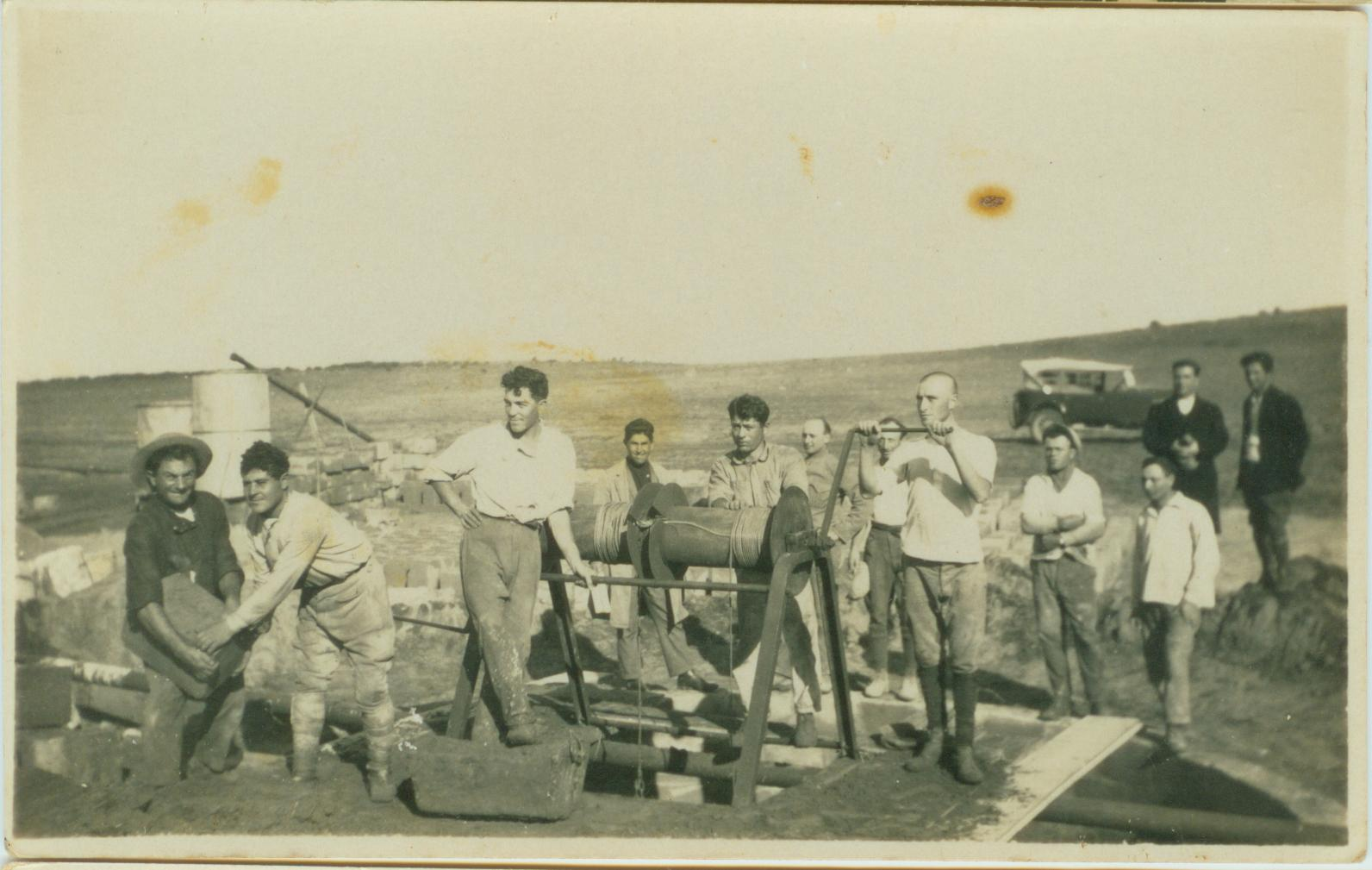
Drilling of the first well, 1929-30

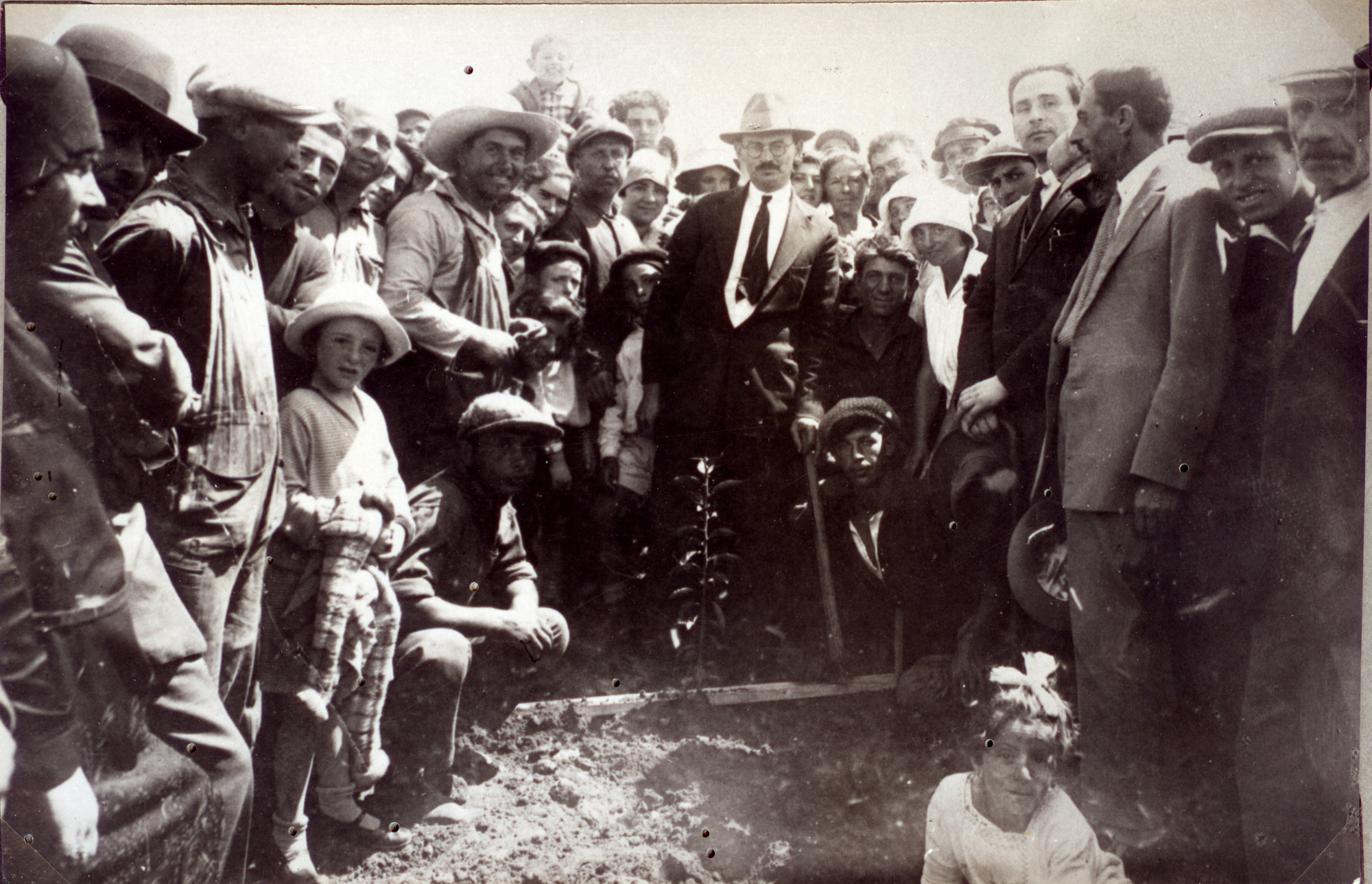
Planting the first orchard, 1929-30

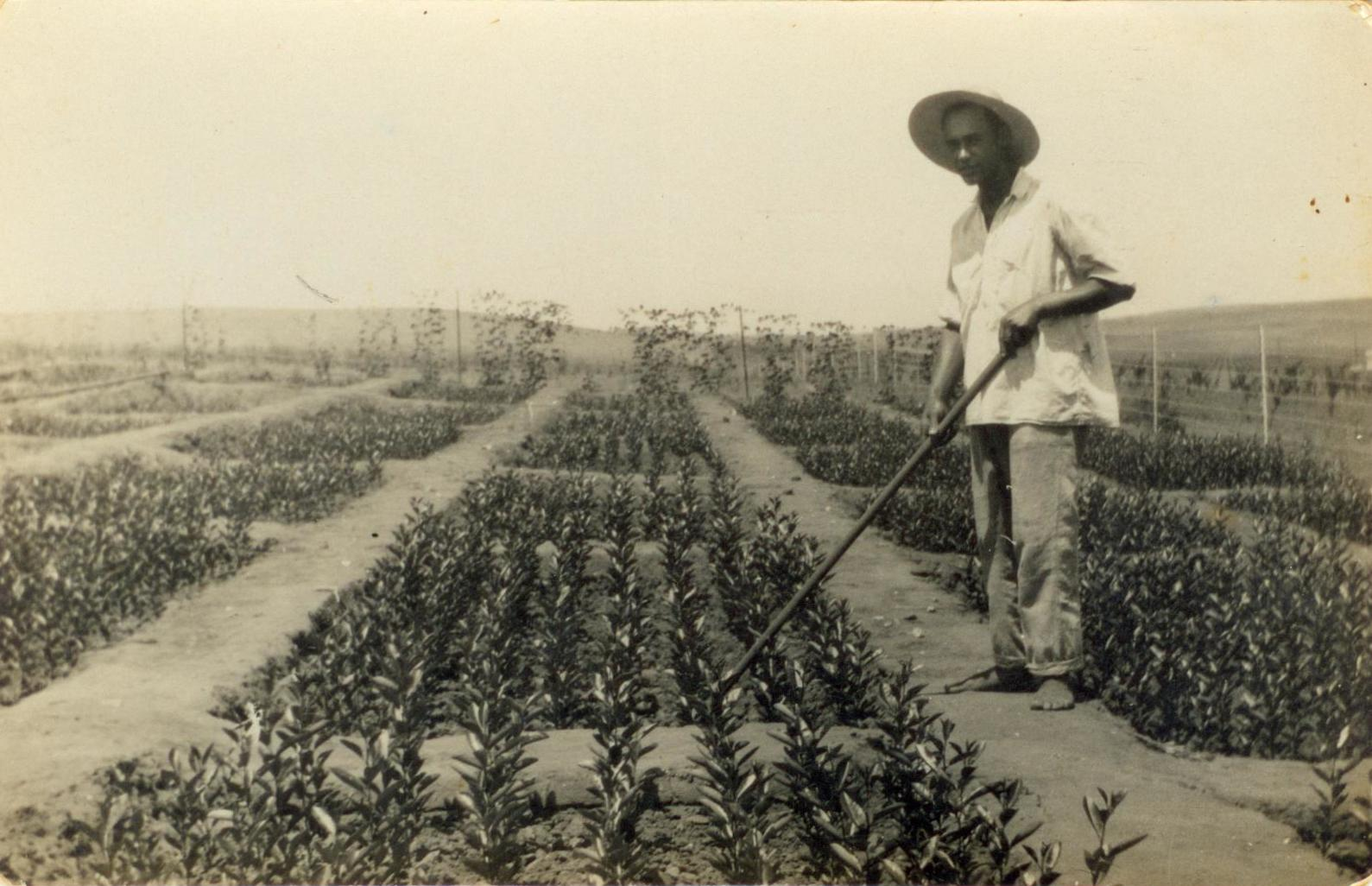
Early 1930s first citrus nursery

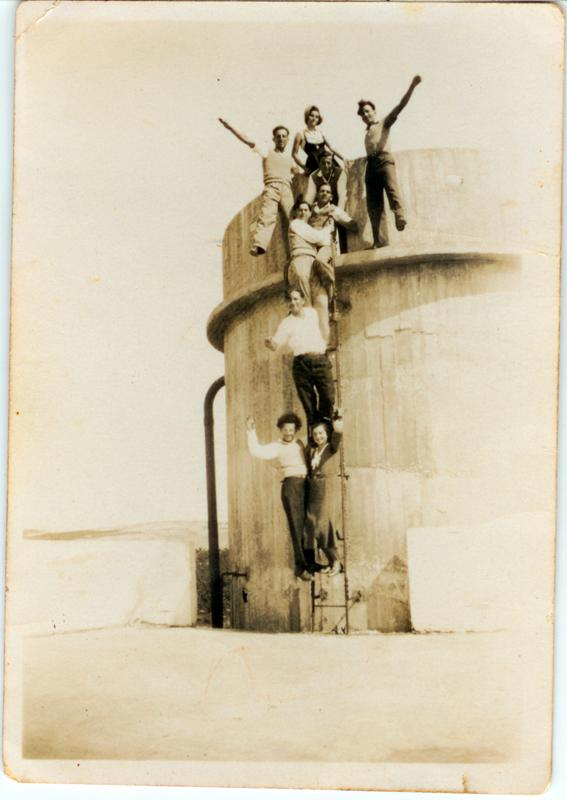
Water tower ladder of the Beit Hanan school, 1935

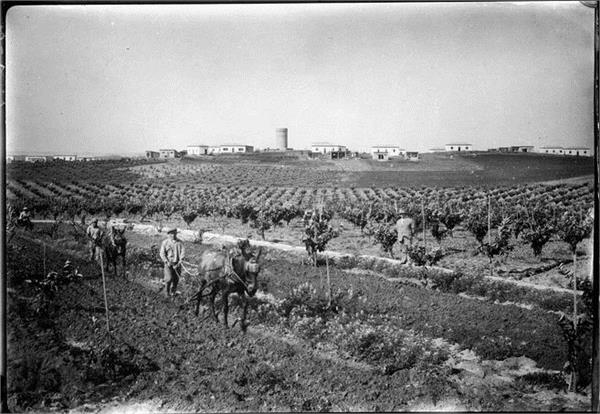
Beit Hanan 1935

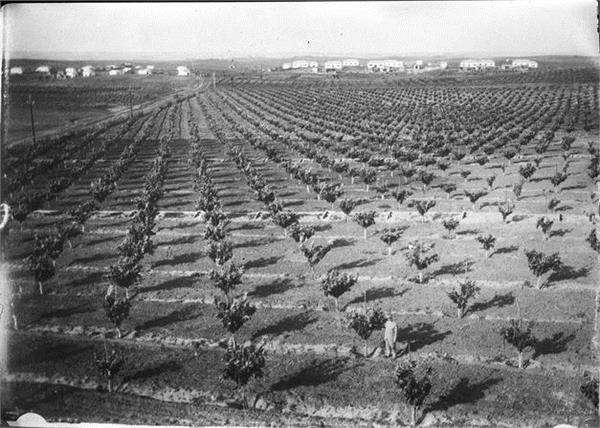
Orchards, 1934

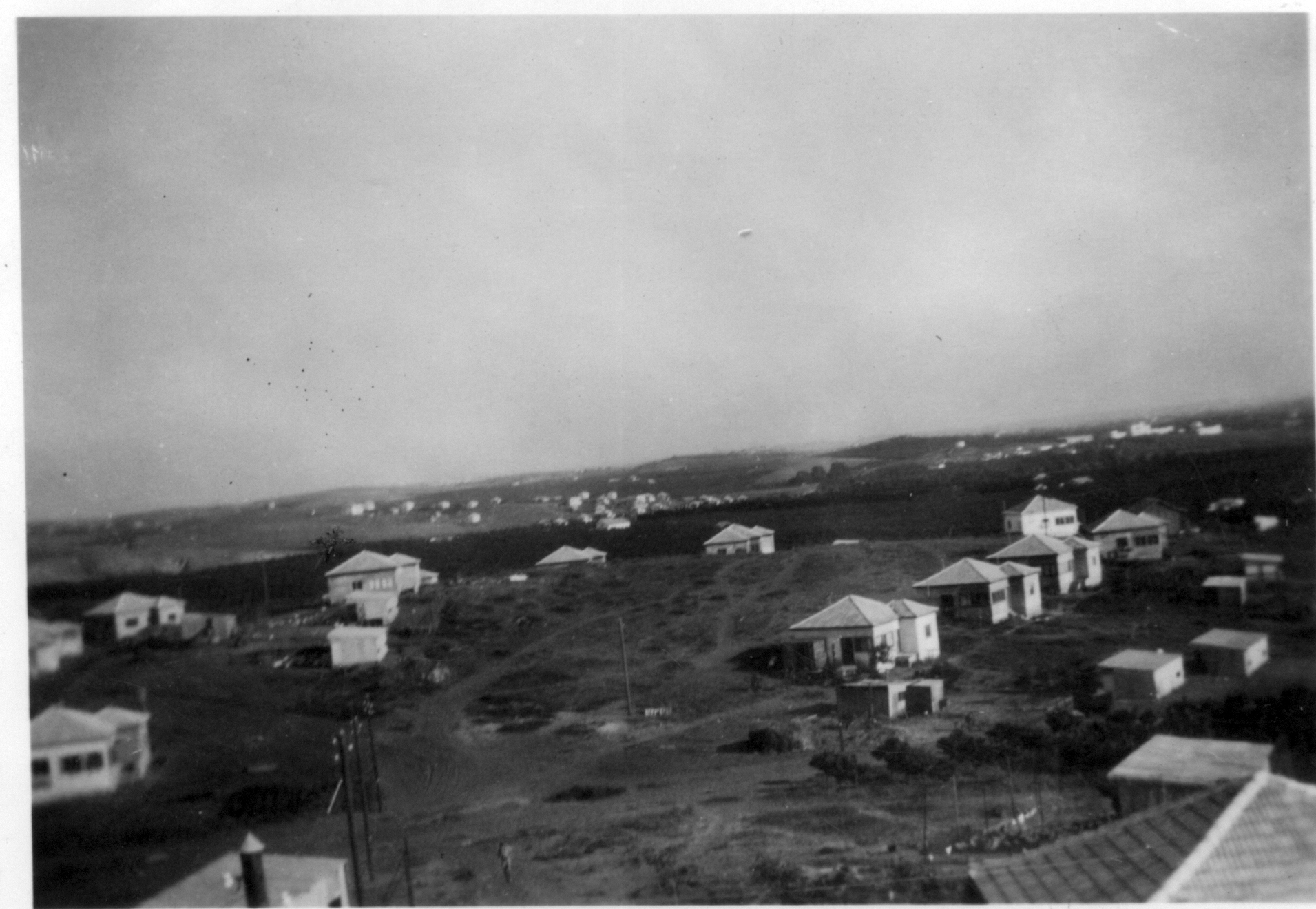
Settlement Hill in Beit Hanan, 1934-36

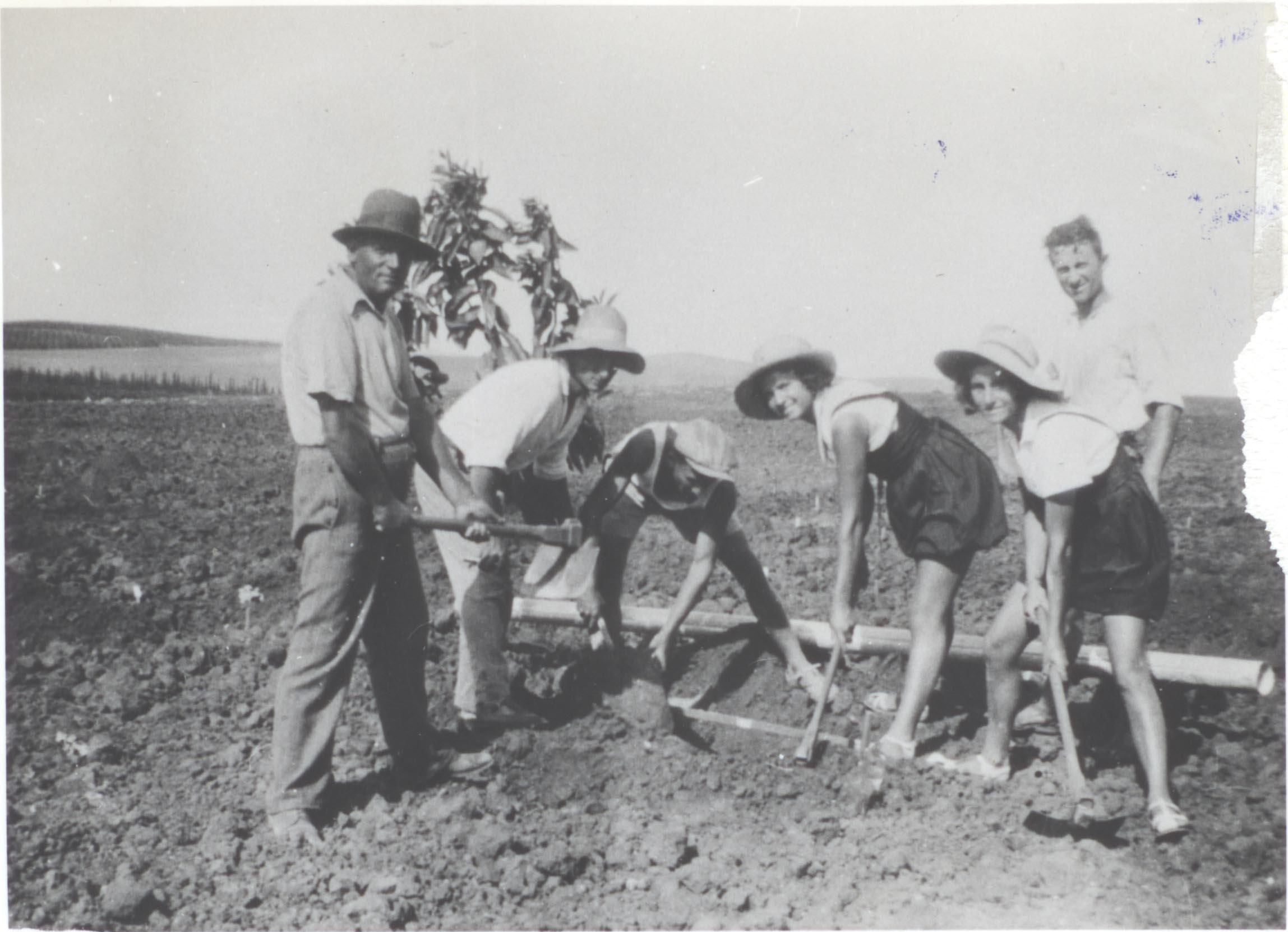
Planting the first orange grove of the family farm under the direction of Papa Avraham Menda, 1935-36

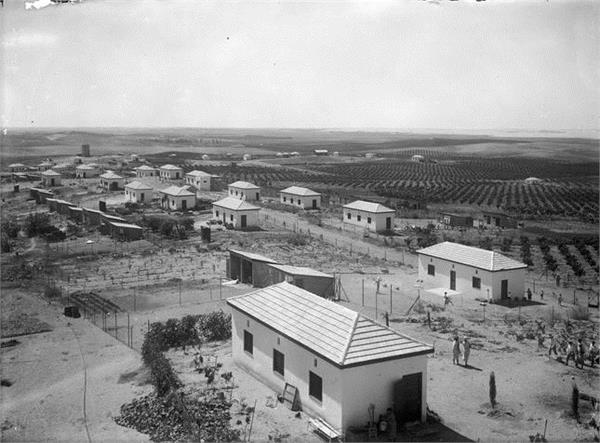
Panorama, 1935

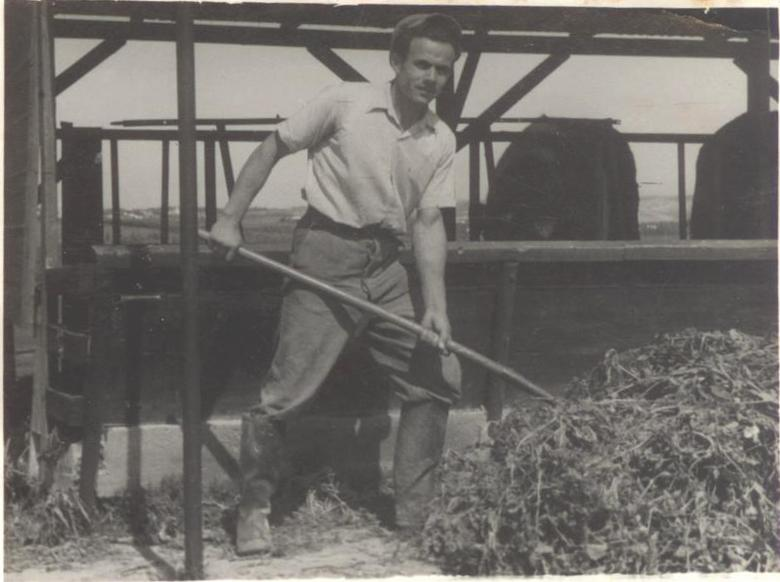
Isaac Menda working at the cowshed, 1935

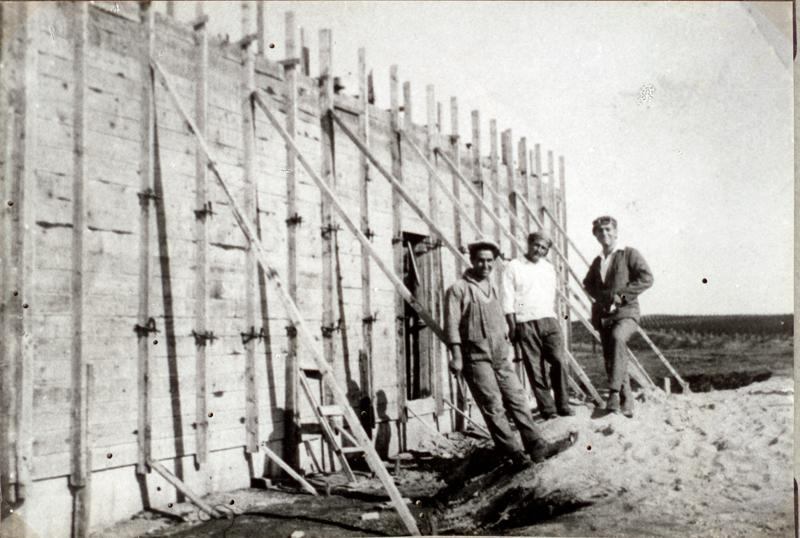
Construction of the first permanent homes, 1935

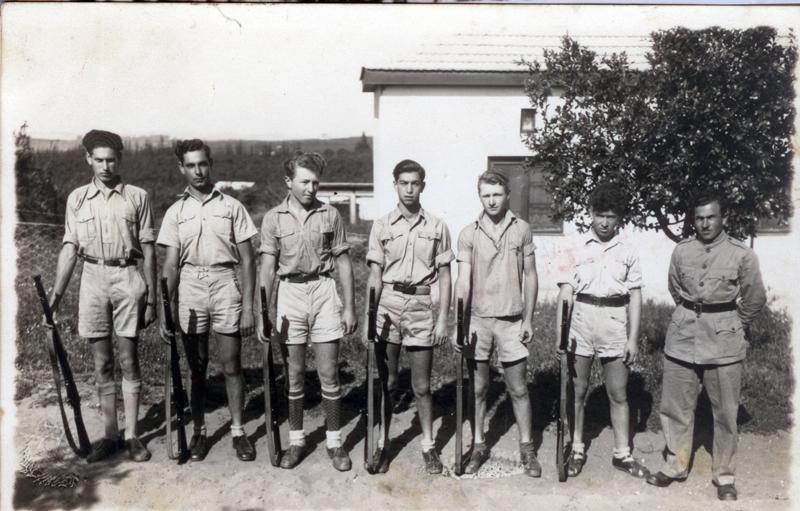
A Gadna group (paramilitary youth brigades) in training, 1940-45

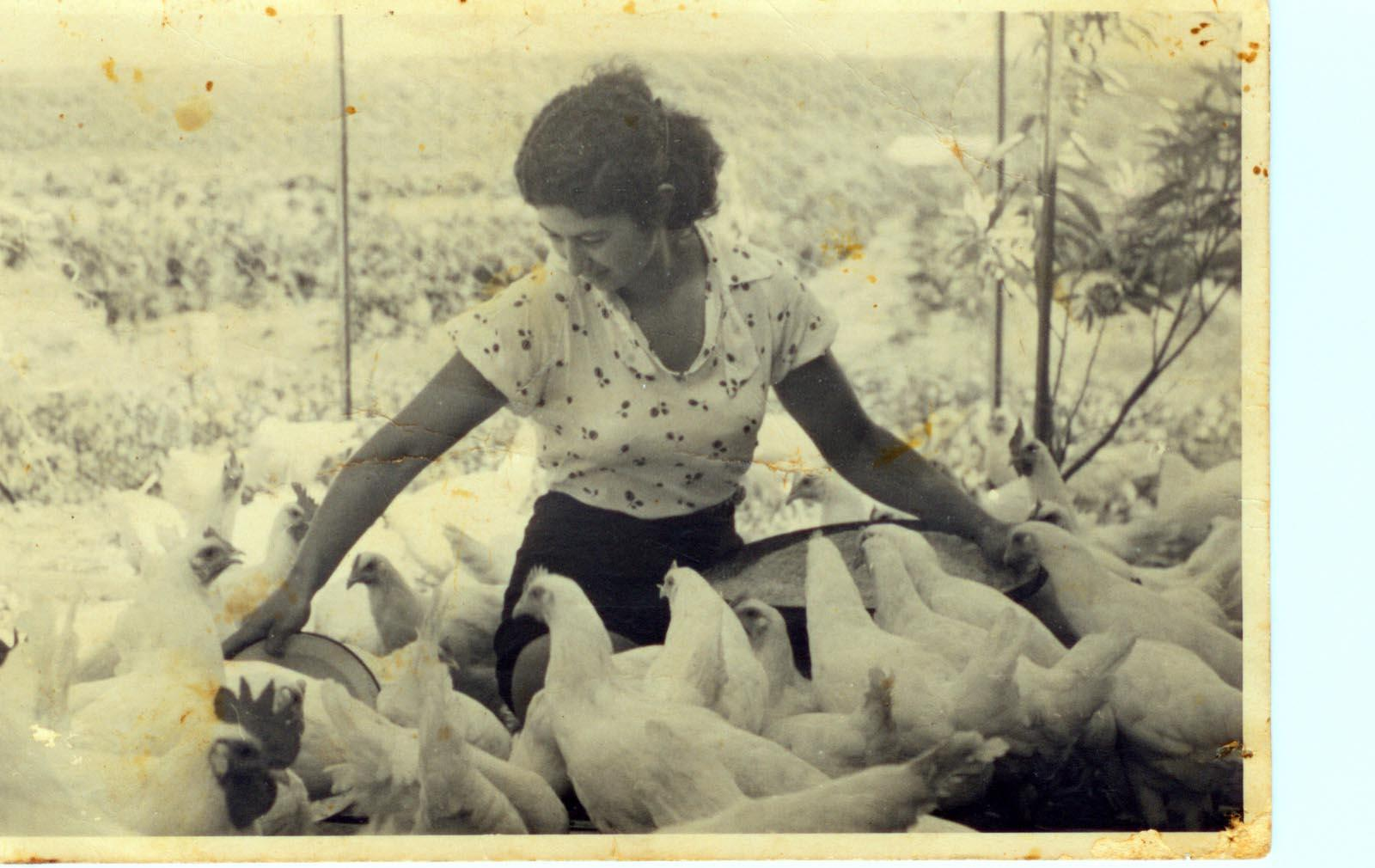
Germain Manda in the family laying coop in the 1940s

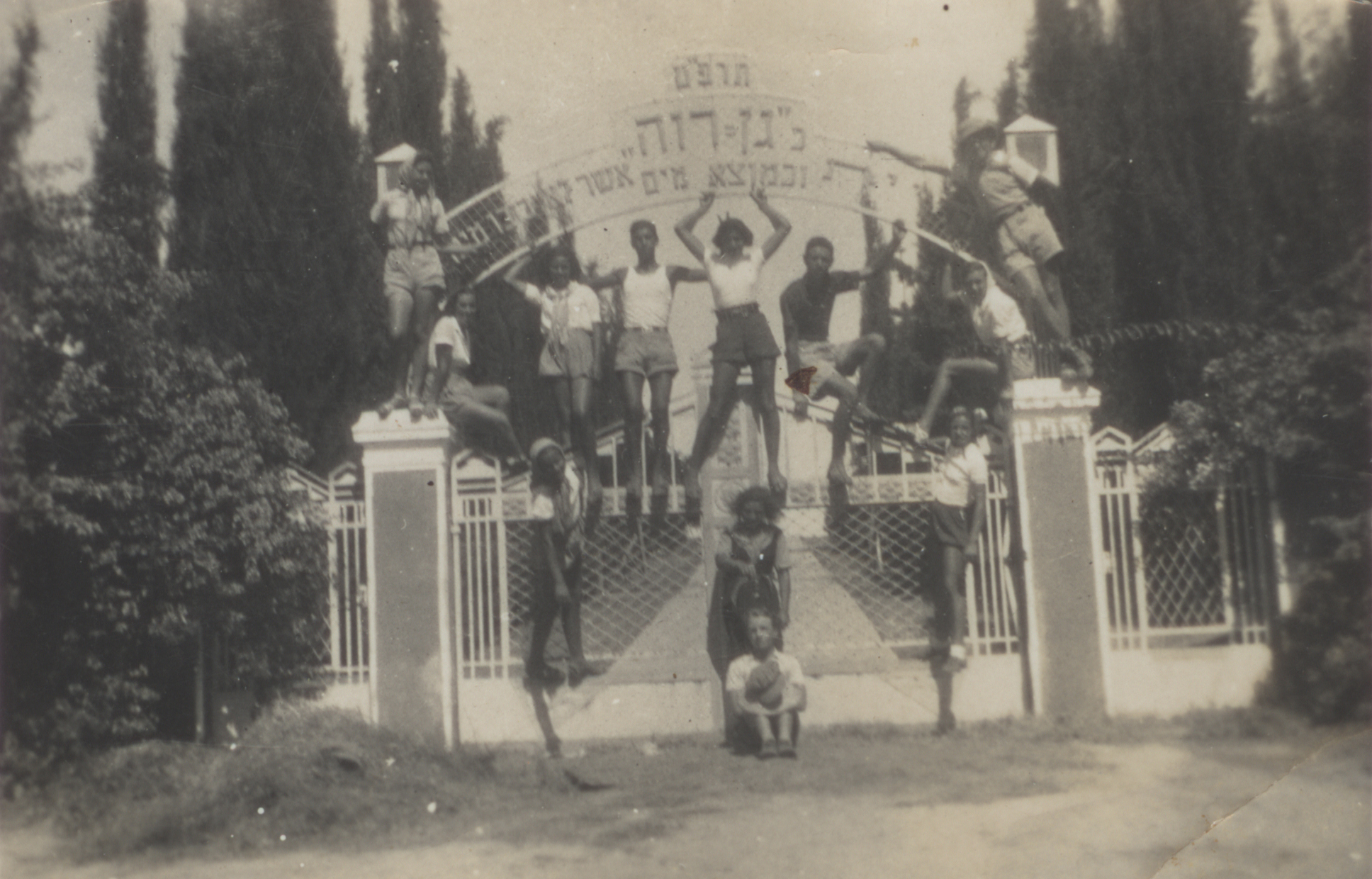
Beit-Hanan youth group at Gan Rave gate, 1940-43

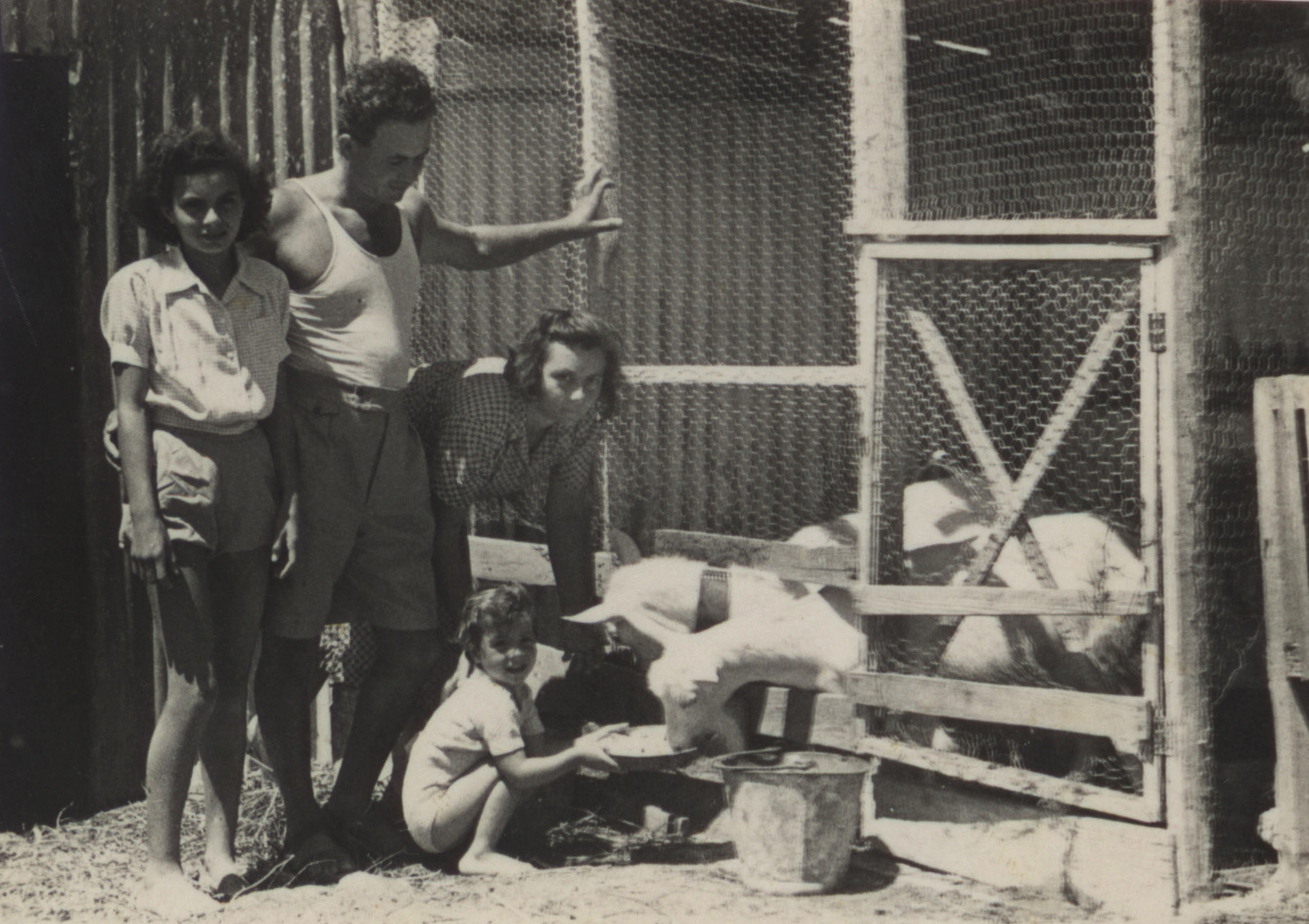
Family goat shed, 1946

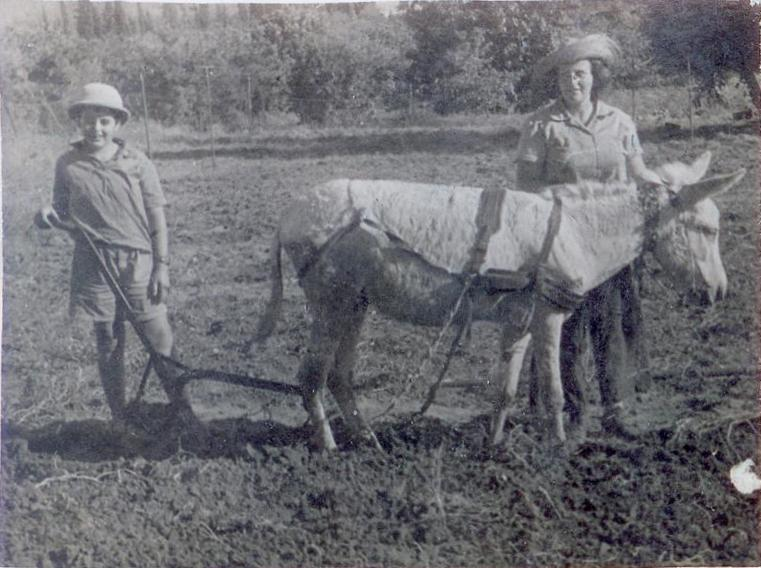
Using donkey for plowing, 1947

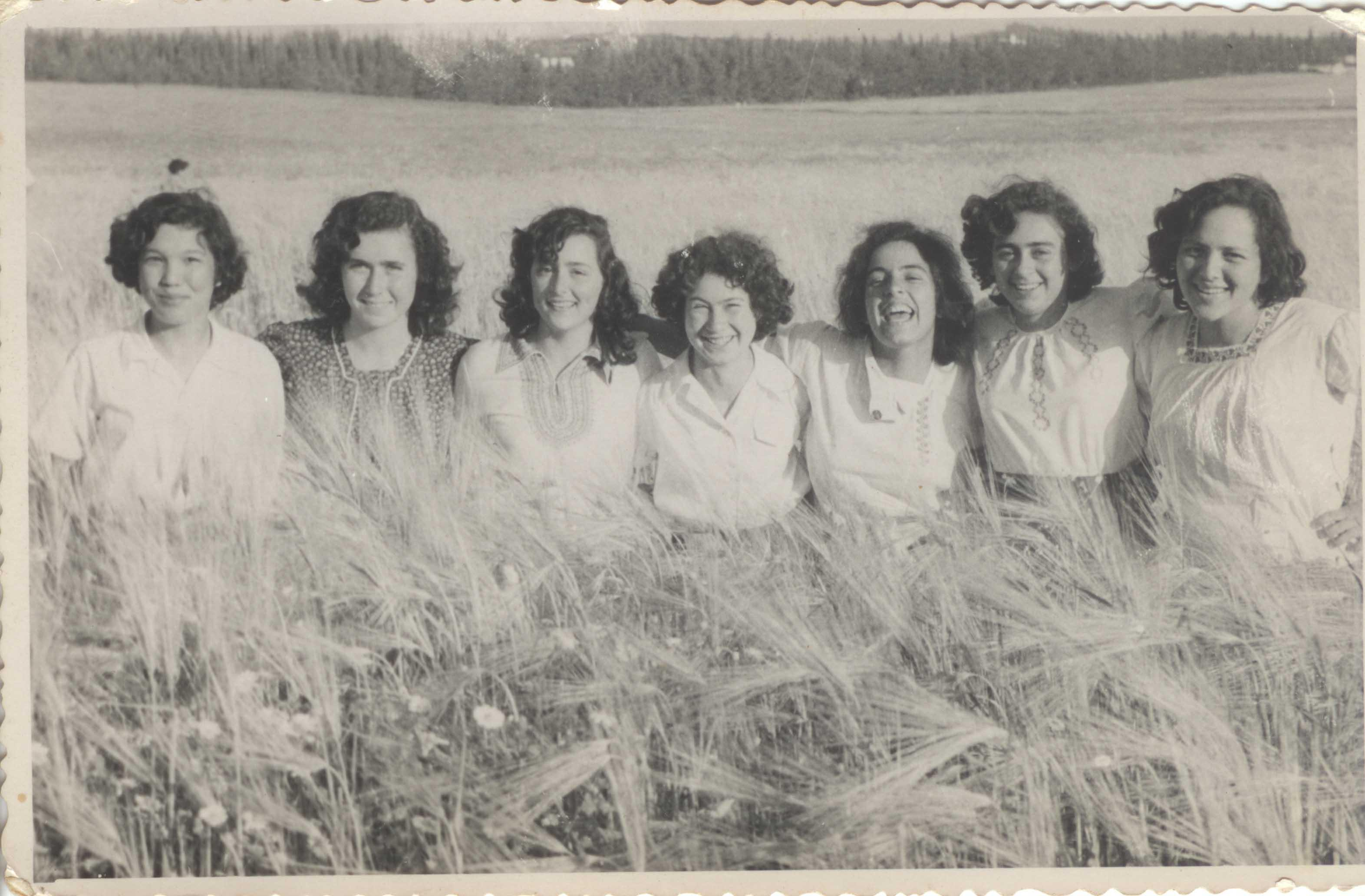
Beit Hanan girls during first harvest celebrations, 1951-52

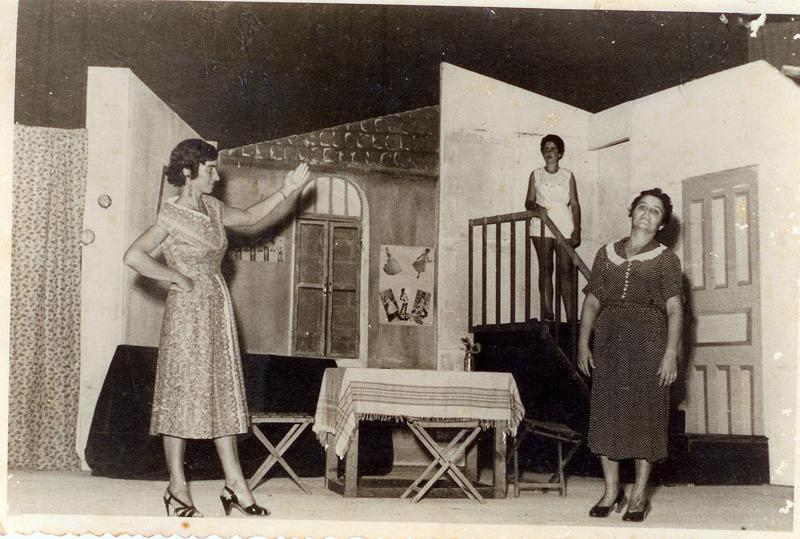
Beit Hanan drama group, 1952

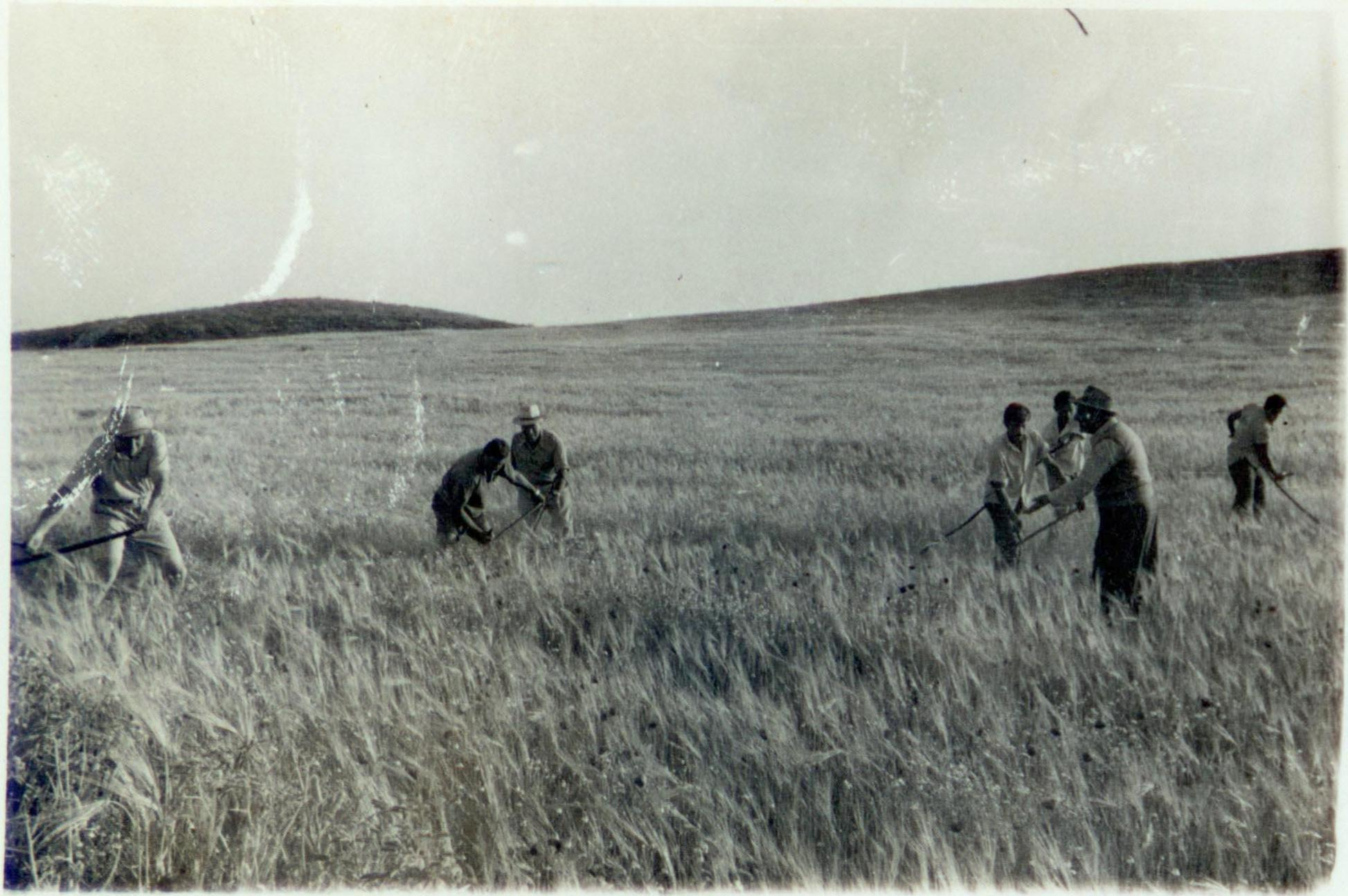
Harvest competition during the first harvest celebrations in the early 1950s

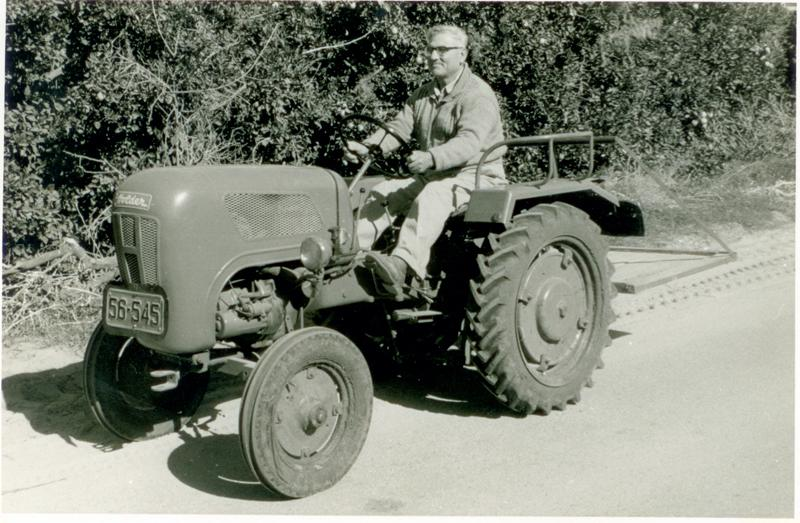
Sami Shmuel Mayer on his Holder tractor, 1957-58

=== Now ===
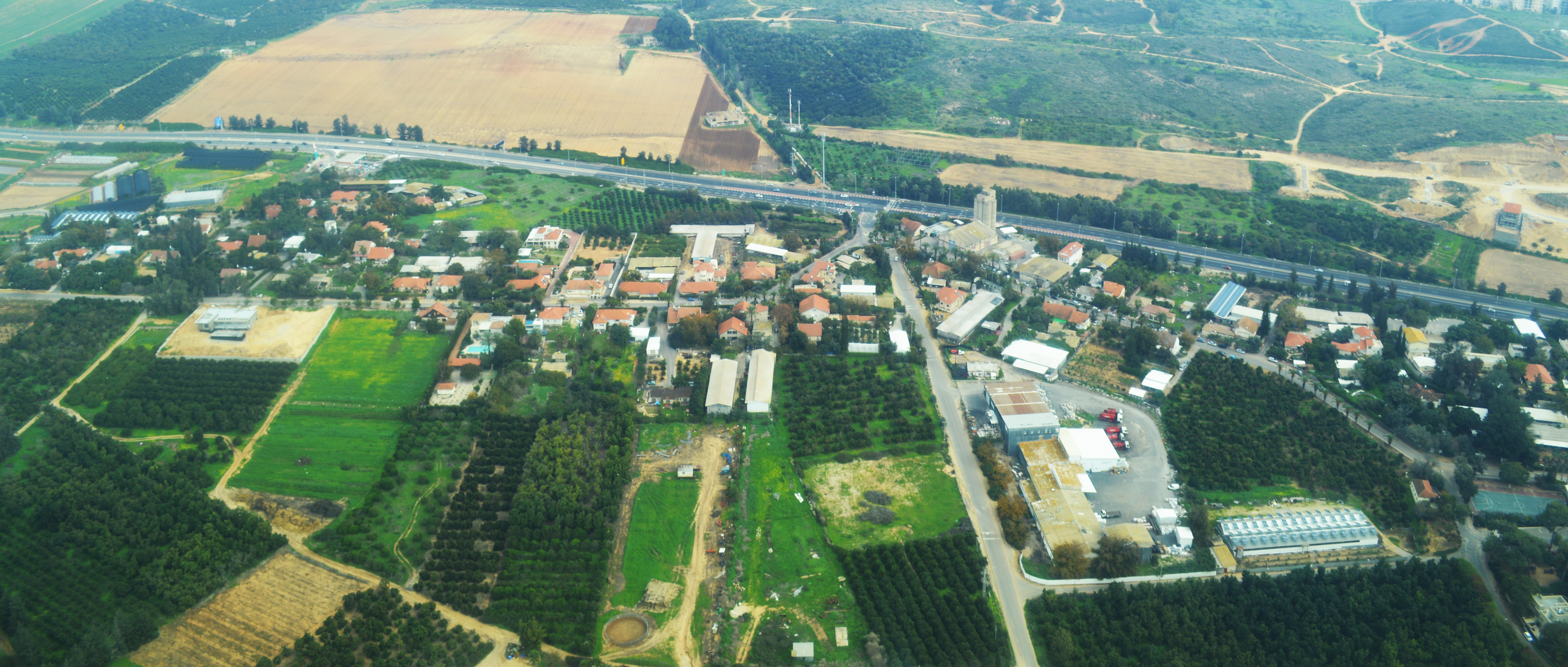
Aerial View, 2012

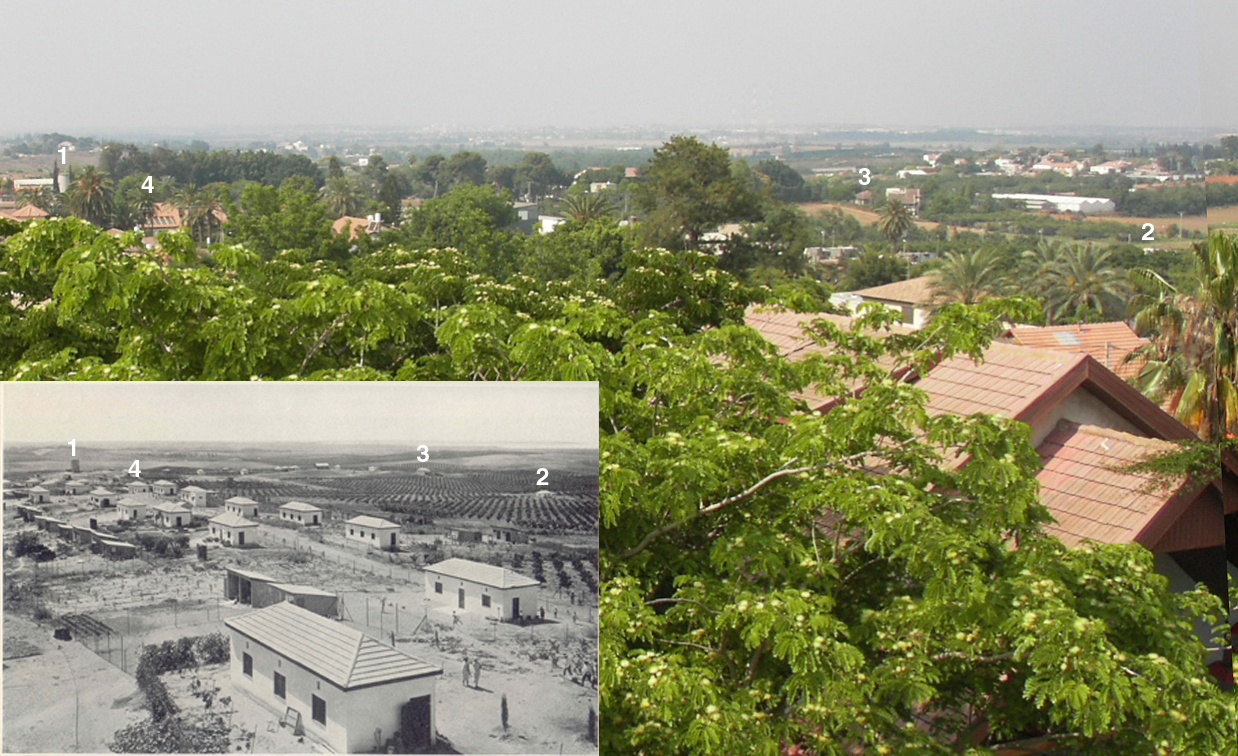
Beit-Hanan then (1933) and now (2007)

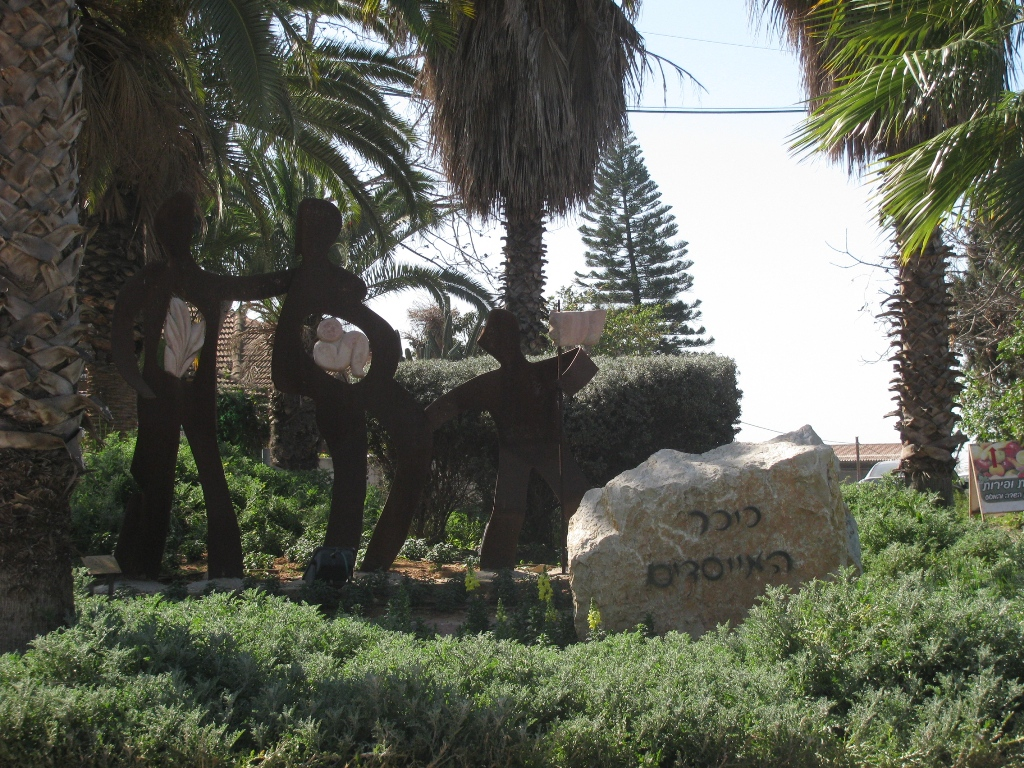
Founders Memorial at the entrance to Moshav

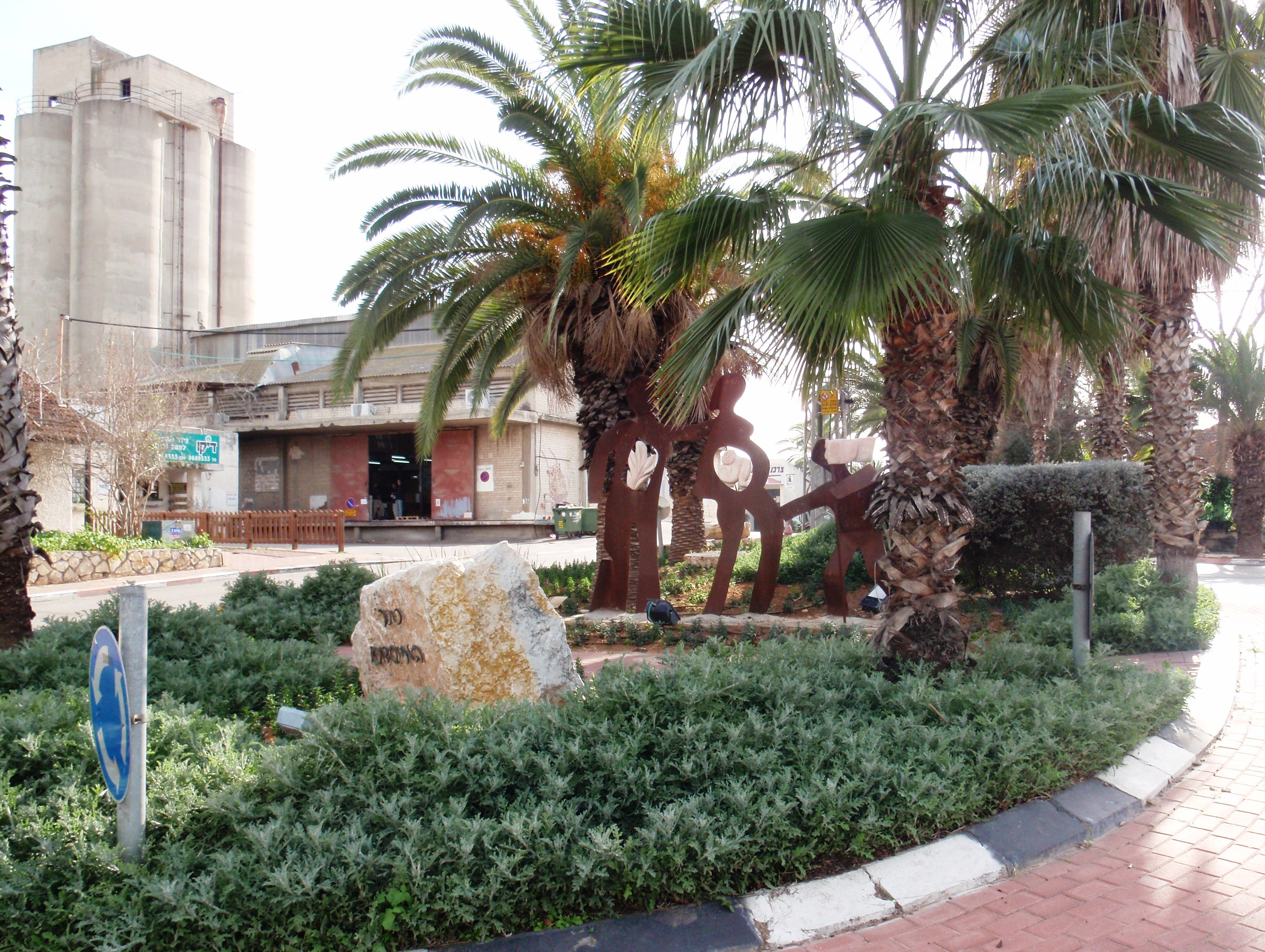
Founders Square
