= Ayanot =

Youth village in central Israel

Ayanot: עֲיָנוֹת (Hebrew)
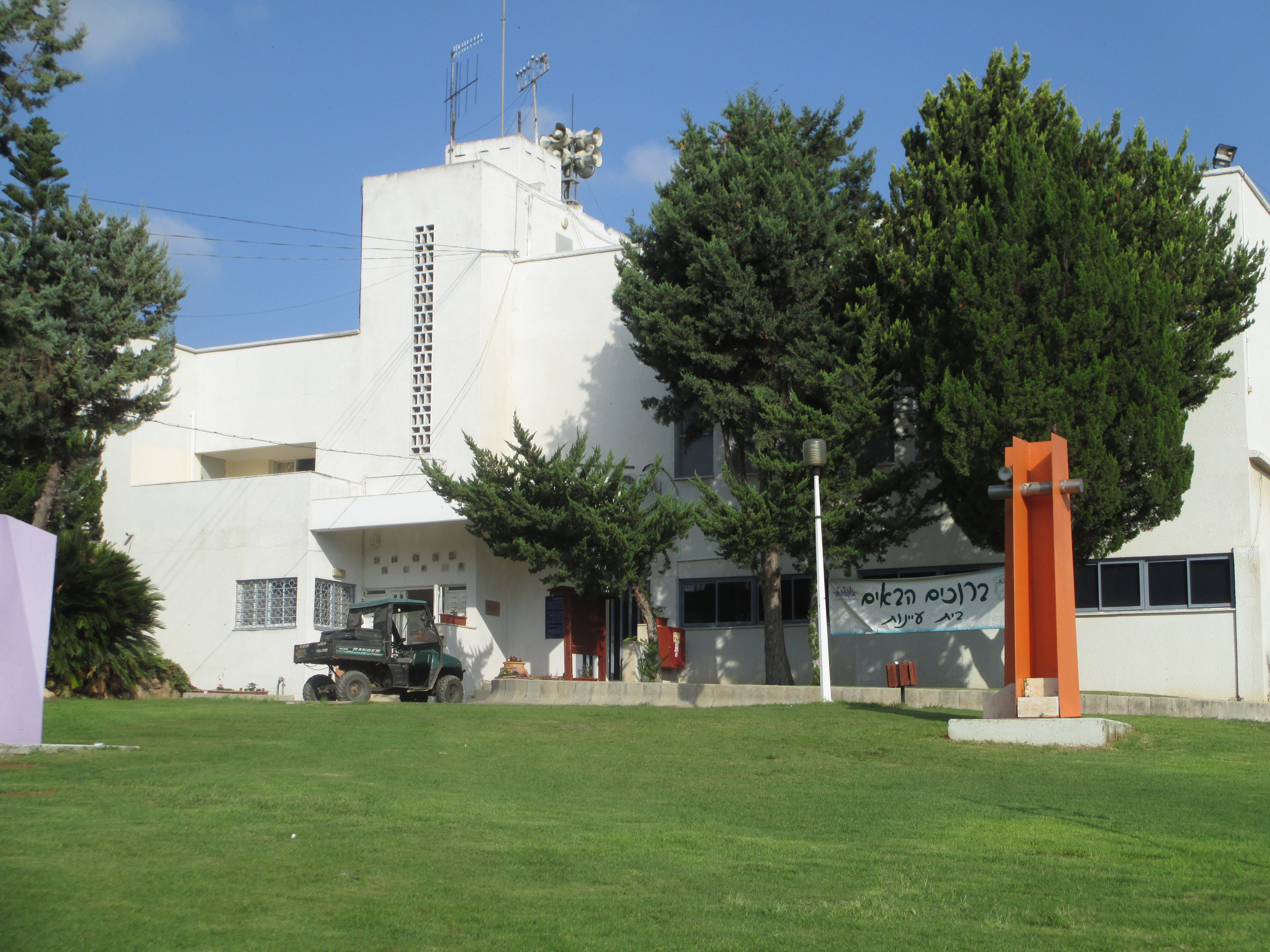
- Etymology: Springs
- Location within Central Israel Location within Israel
- Coordinates: 31°54′57″N 34°46′5″E
- Country: Israel
- District: Central
- Subdistrict: Rehovot
- Council: Gan Raveh
- Founded: 30 March 1930–12 January 1932
- Founder: Ada Maimon
- Population (2024): 121
- Website: ayanot.org.il

Ayanot (Hebrew: עֲיָנוֹת, lit. 'Fountains') is a youth village in central Israel. Located near Ness Ziona, it falls under the jurisdiction of Gan Raveh Regional Council. In 2024 it had a population of 121.

== Etymology ==
The village was named after the numerous springs in the area, though other sources claim it is taken from Deuteronomy 8:7; "For the LORD thy God bringeth thee into a good land, a land of brooks of water, of fountains and depths, springing forth in valleys and hills." The Jewish National Fund wrote in 1949 that the name is derived from the Arabic.

== History ==
The foundation of the village began with the purchase of 140 acres (0.57 km^{2}) of land by Ada Maimon as a girl's training farm in 1926. The village was established on 30 March 1930, though no-one lived on the site until Maimon, ten girls and a guard moved in on 12 January 1932; until then they had lived in nearby Ness Ziona.

During World War II, the village became an agricultural school and took in young Holocaust survivors who had succeeded in immigrating. Today it is home to a boarding school for 180 pupils. A few years ago, the agricultural school opened a miniature horse farm and one of its horses was a runner-up in the 2008 world championship for miniature horses.

In 2010, the village celebrated its 80th anniversary.

== Gallery ==
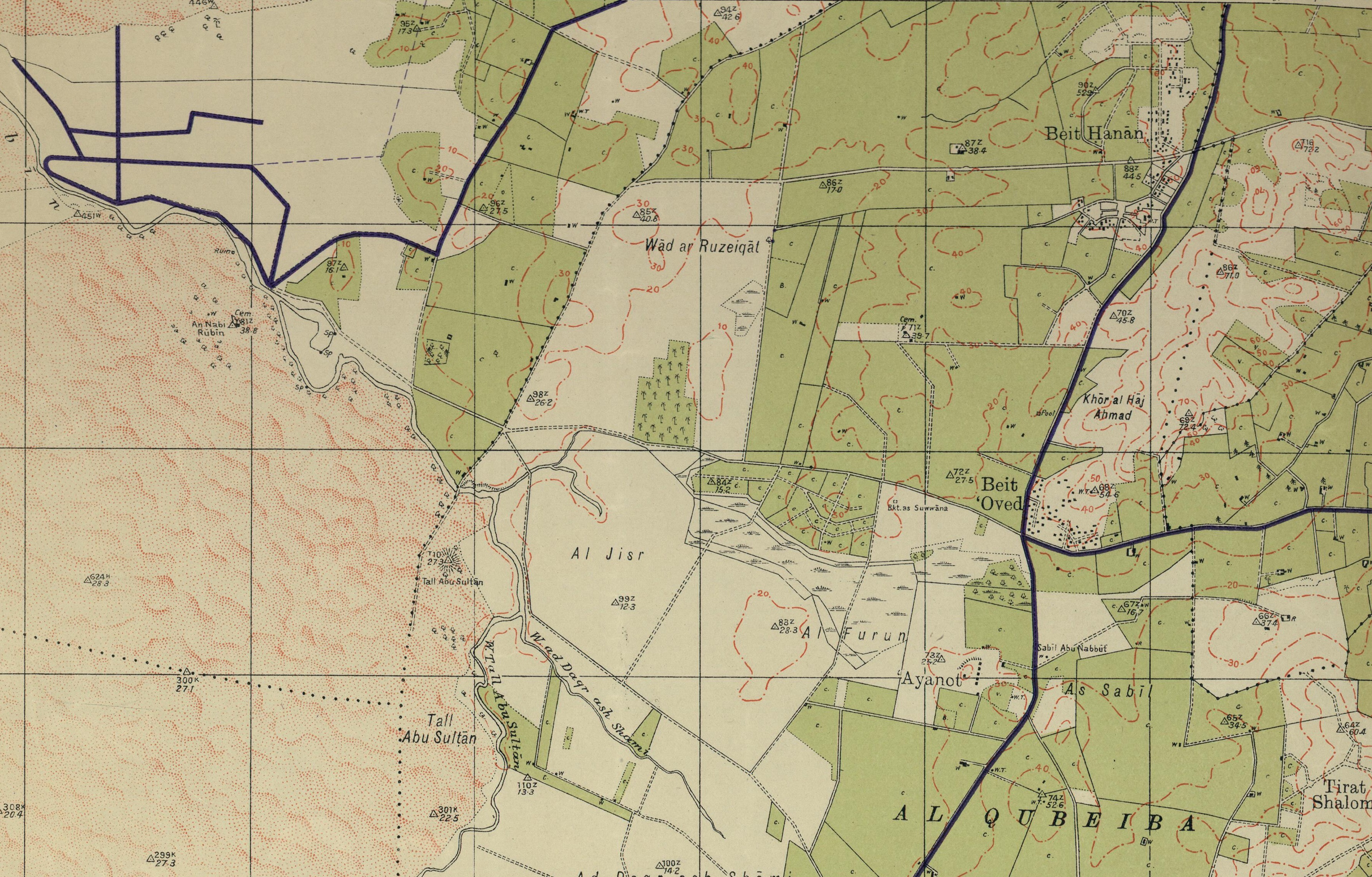
Ayanot 1941 1:20,000

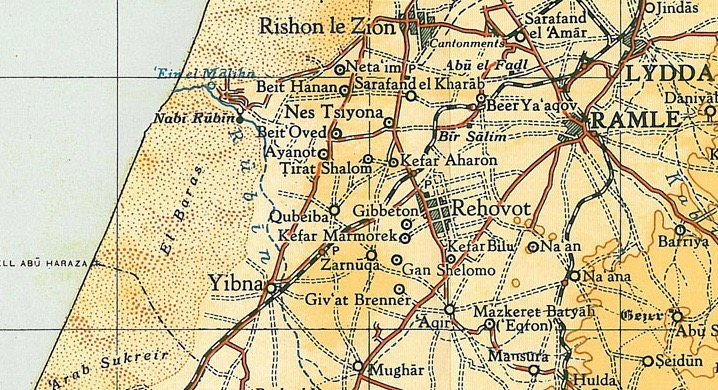
Ayanot1945 1:250,000

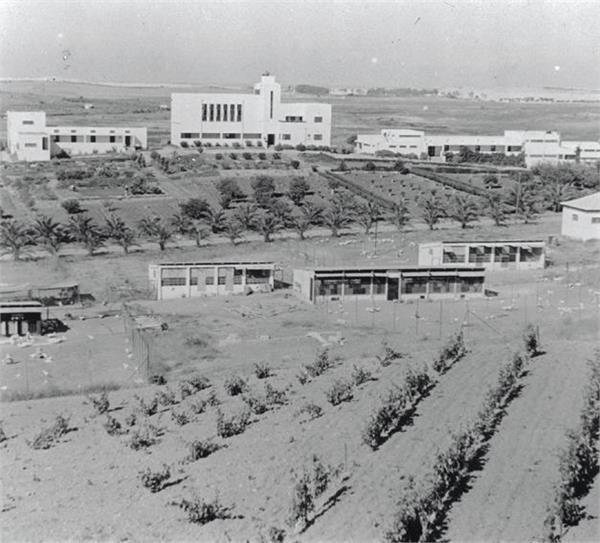
Ayanot 1930

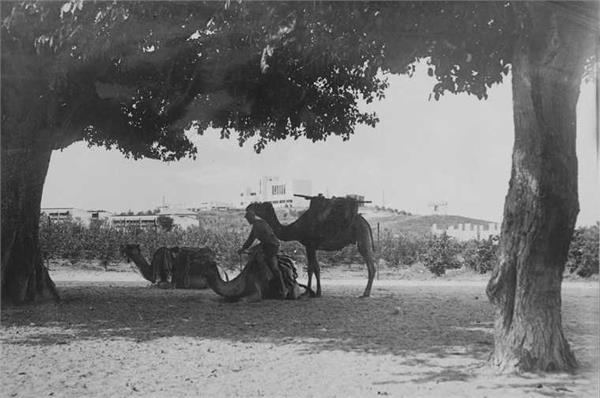
Ayanot 1934

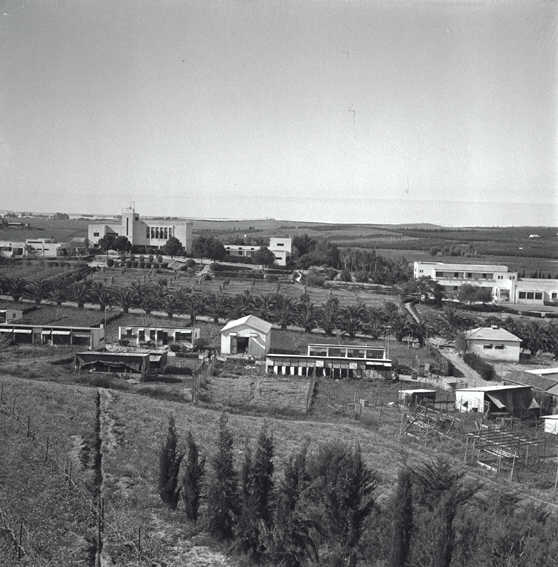
Ayanot 1945

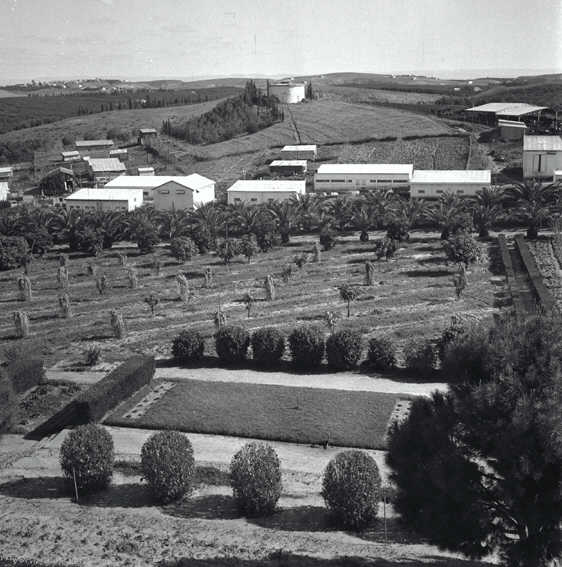
Worker's farm 1945

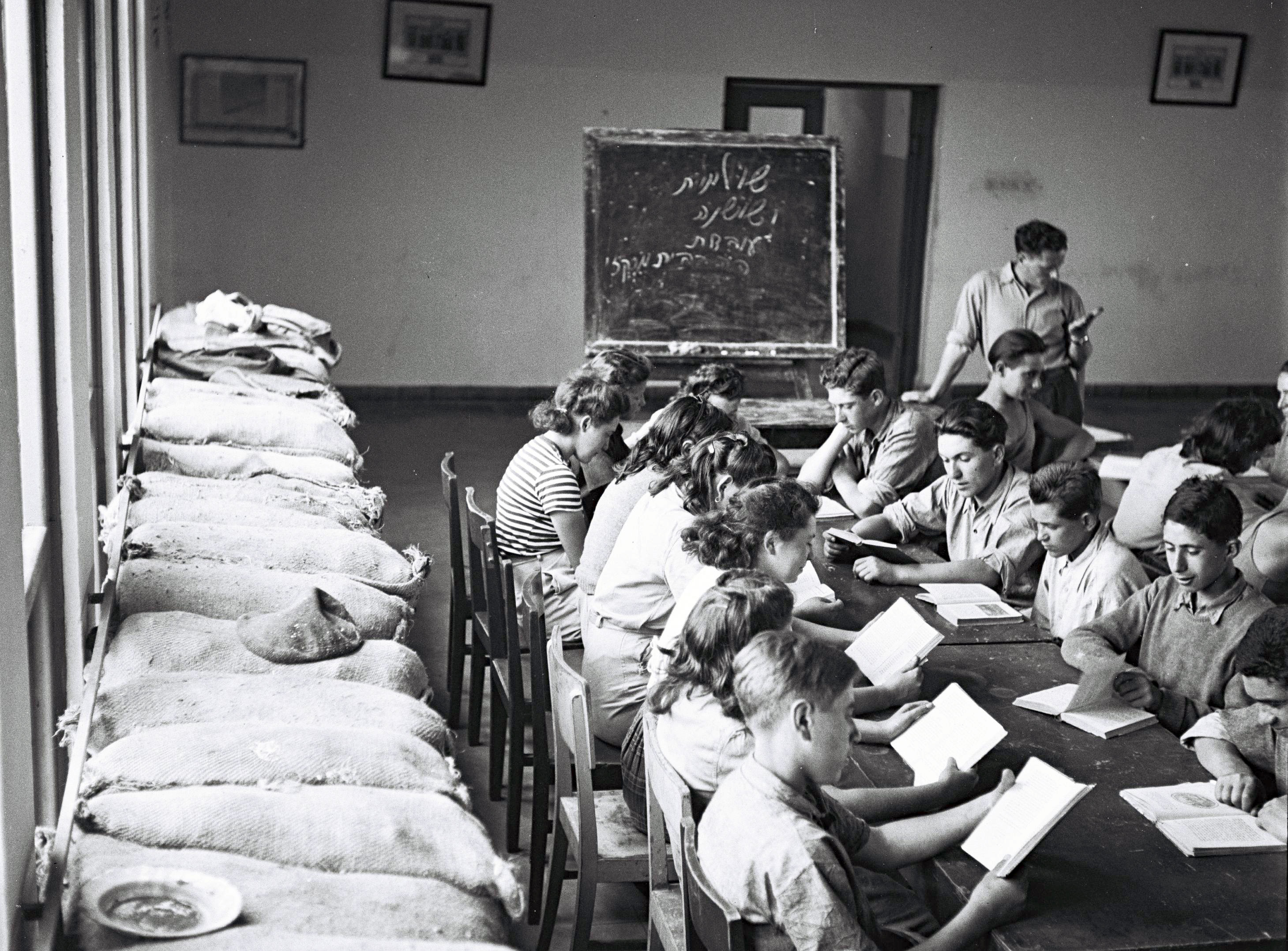
Young people studying at Ayanot, 1948
