= Beit Oved =

Moshav in central Israel

Beit Oved: בֵּית עוֹבֵד (Hebrew)
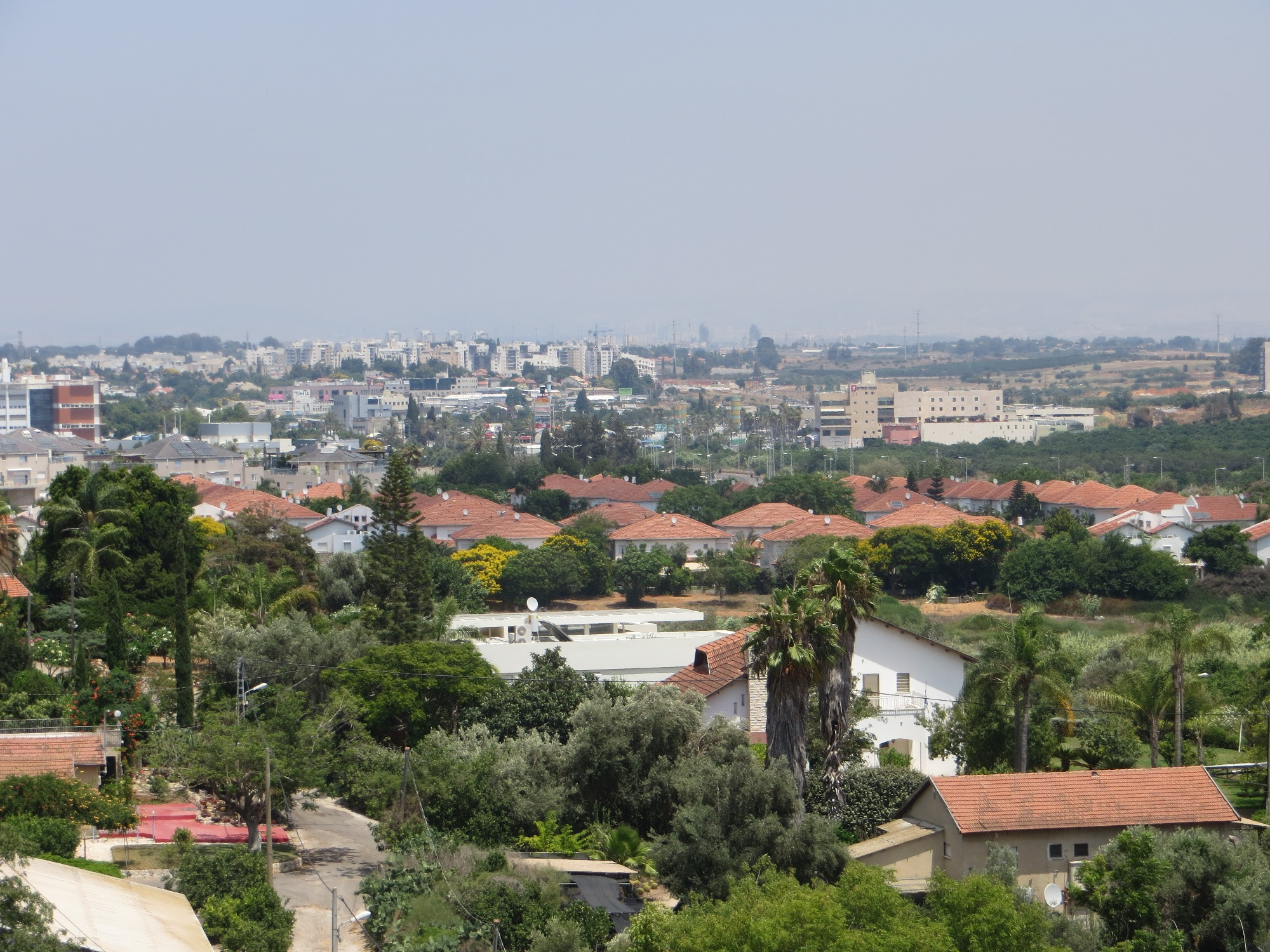

- Location within Central Israel Location within Israel
- Coordinates: 31°55′18″N 34°46′25″E
- Country: Israel
- District: Central
- Subdistrict: Rehovot
- Council: Gan Raveh
- Affiliation: Moshavim Movement
- Founded: 1933
- Population (2024): 300

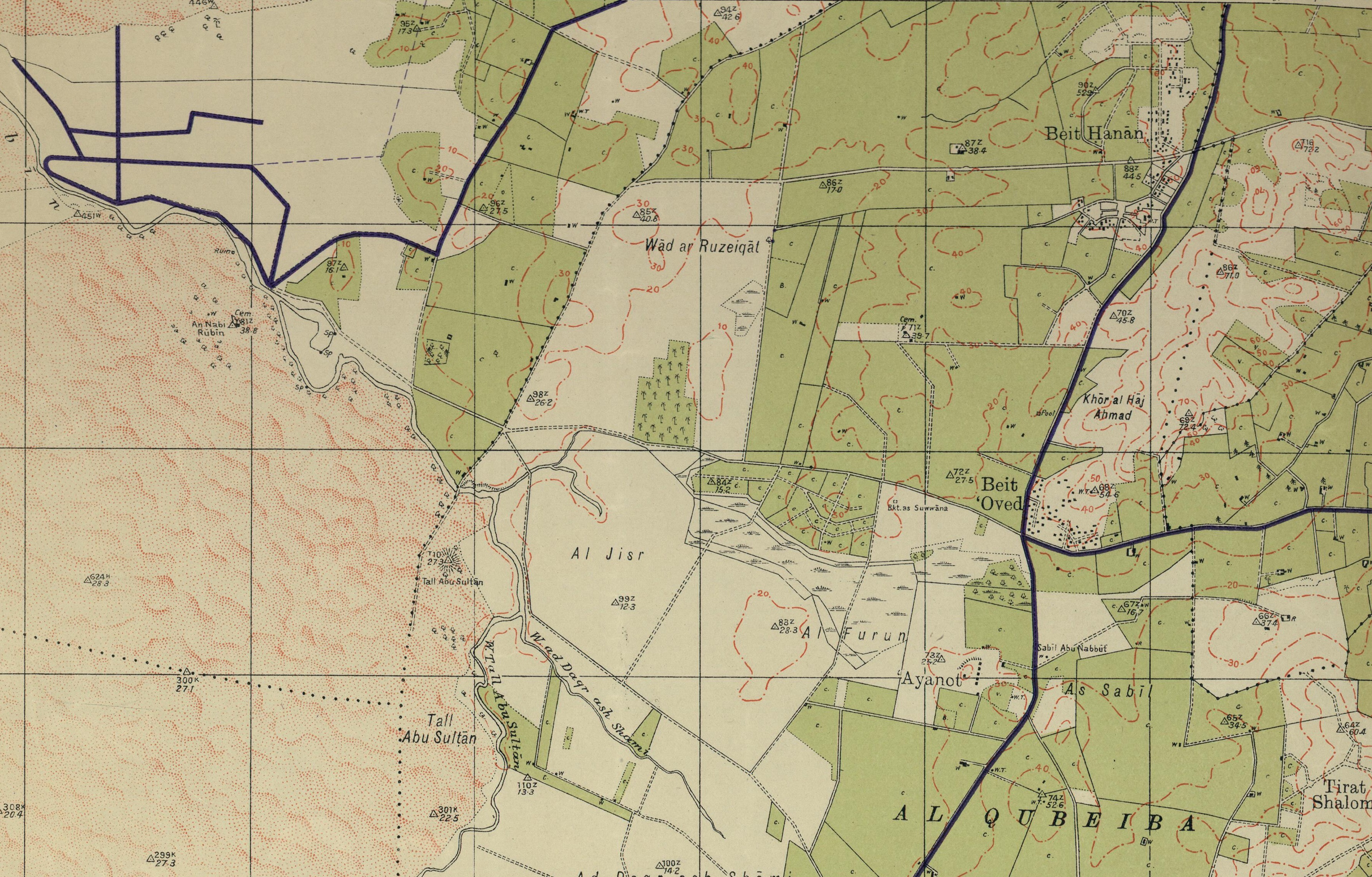
Beit Oved 1941 1:20,000

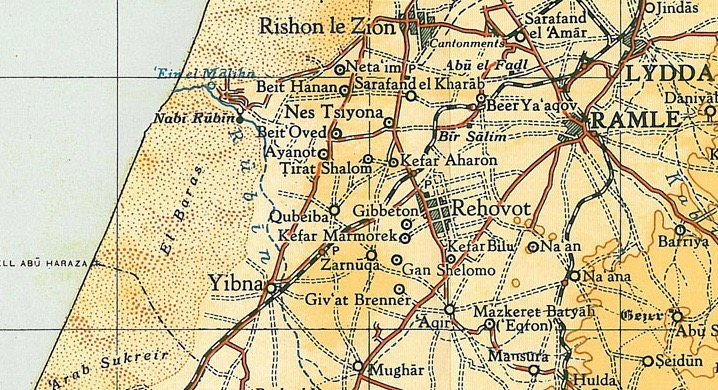
Beit Oved 1945 1:250,000

Beit Oved (Hebrew: בֵּית עוֹבֵד, lit. 'House of Worker' or 'House of Obed') is a moshav in central Israel. Located on the outskirts of Ness Ziona, it falls under the jurisdiction of Gan Raveh Regional Council. In 2024 its population was 300.

== Etymology ==
The name is based on one of two biblical passages: And the ark of God remained with the family of Obed-edom in his house three months; and the LORD blessed the house of Obed-edom, and all that he had. (1 Chronicles 13:14) or: He that tilleth his ground shall have plenty of bread; but he that followeth after vain things is void of understanding. (Proverbs 12:11)

== History ==
The moshav was founded in 1933 by a group of veteran farmers, as part of the Settlement of the Thousand plan, a response to the 1929 Palestine riots in which small farm settlements were built on the outskirts of Jewish towns and moshavot to improve security. A grove of oak trees was planted on the hilltop adjacent to the synagogue and community center to commemorate people from the region who died during the 1936–1939 Arab revolt.

== Notable people ==
- David Tabak (1927–2012), Olympic runner
