= Palmachim =

Kibbutz in central Israel

Palmachim: פַּלְמַחִים (Hebrew)
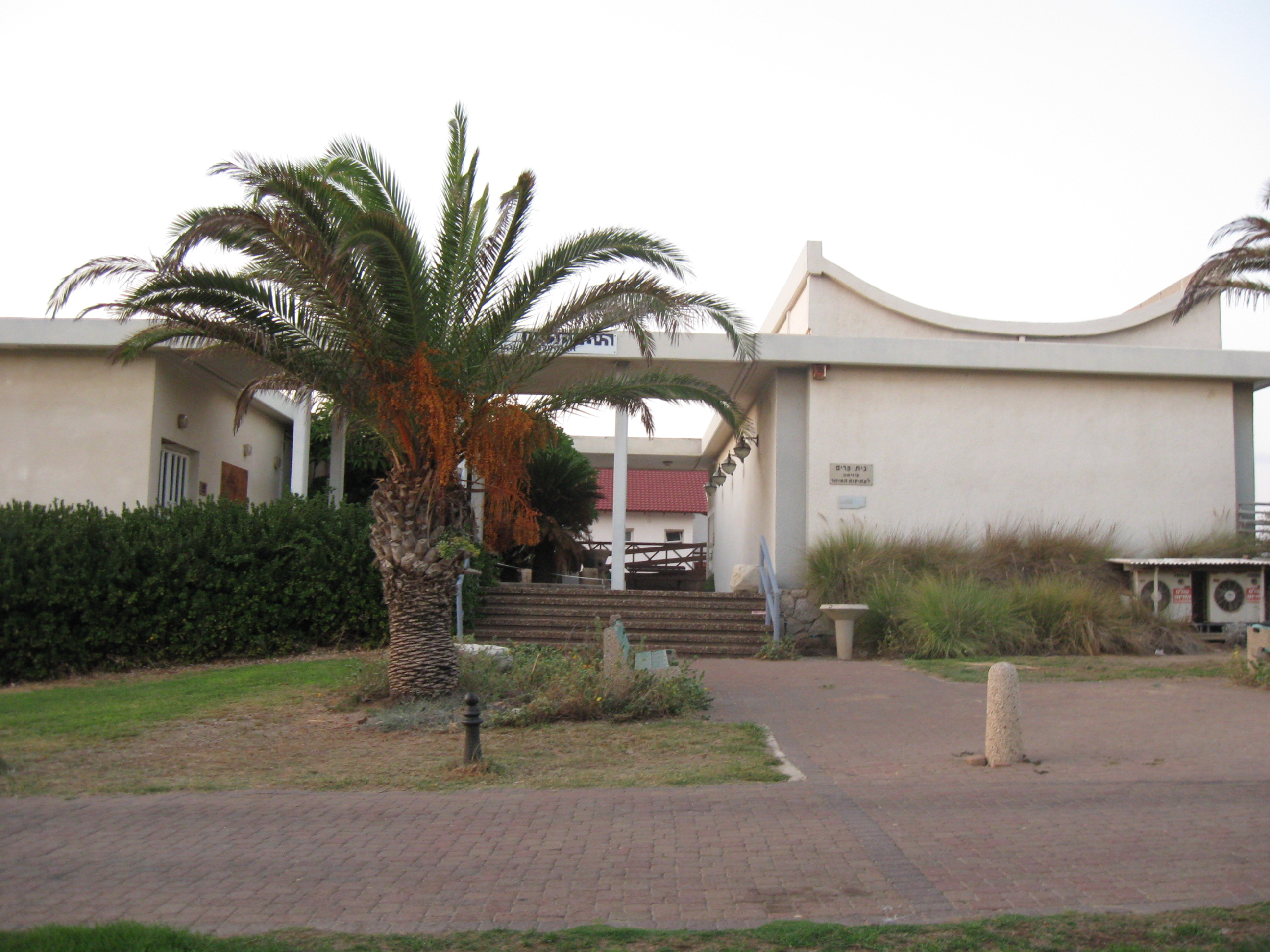

- Location within Central Israel Location within Israel
- Coordinates: 31°56′0″N 34°42′23″E
- Country: Israel
- District: Central
- Subdistrict: Rehovot
- Council: Gan Raveh
- Affiliation: Kibbutz Movement
- Founded: 11 April 1949
- Founder: Palmach veterans
- Population (2024): 848
- Website: www.palmachim.org.il

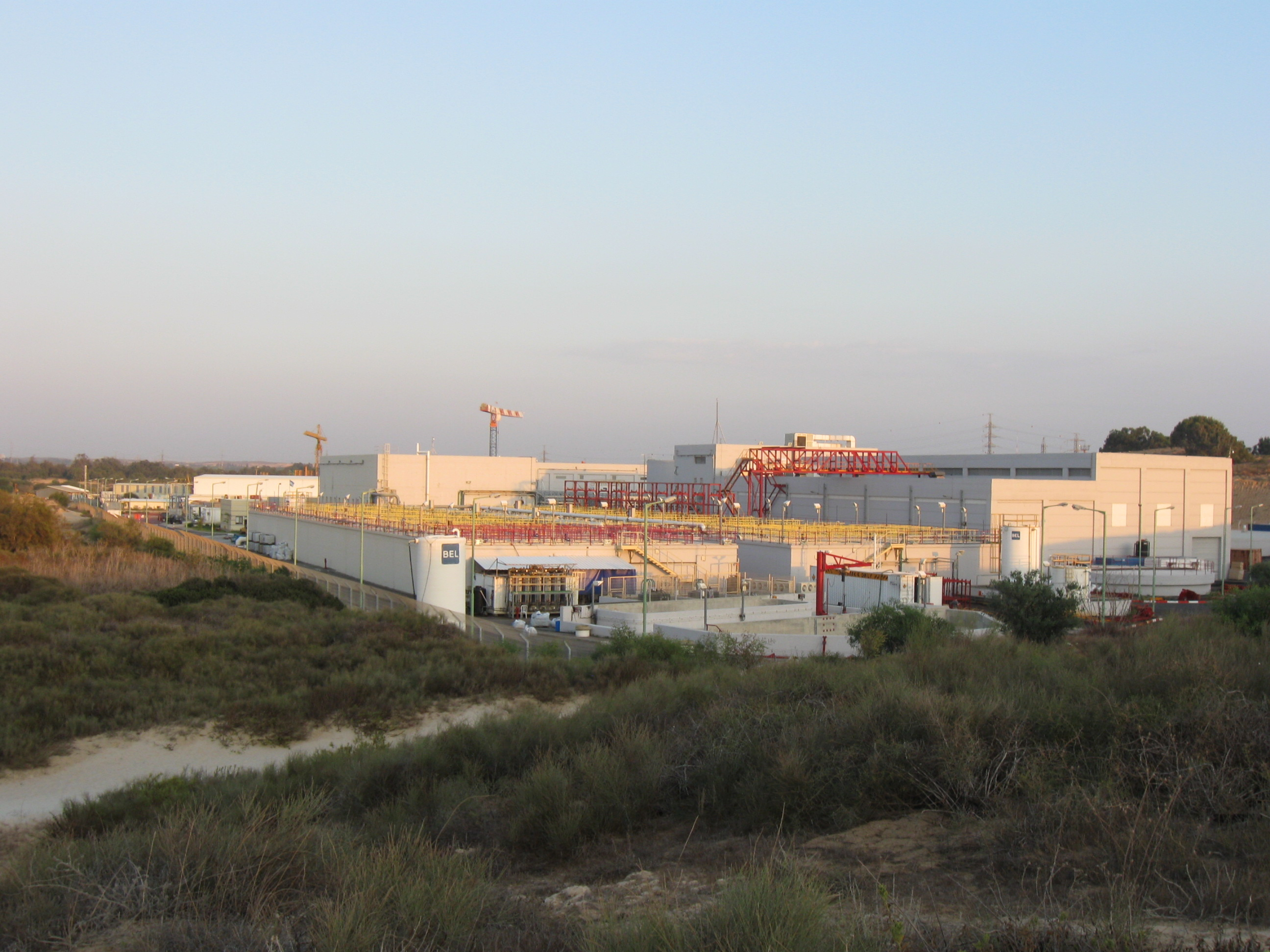
Palmachim desalination plant

Palmachim (Hebrew: פַּלְמַחִים) is a gated community and kibbutz in central Israel. Located about ten kilometers south of the Tel Aviv area along the coast of the Mediterranean Sea, among the sand dunes, it falls under the jurisdiction of Gan Raveh Regional Council. In 2024 it had a population of 848.

== History ==
Palmachim was established on 11 April 1949 by former members of the Palmach underground organization's Yiftach Brigade, on land of the depopulated Palestinian village of Nabi Rubin.

In 2004 the kibbutz underwent privatization. In 2006 former residents of Elei Sinai, an Israeli settlement in the Gaza Strip evicted during the disengagement plan protested to the government until they were allowed to move to the kibbutz. In 2011, 25 families evicted from Elei Sinai (48 persons) were accepted as members to the kibbutz. In 2013, they began building their homes in Palmachim.

== Economy ==
The kibbutz produces agricultural goods and is home to high tech companies.

== Tourism ==
The ruins of ancient Yavne's seaport, Yavneh-Yam, are located nearby, and its archaeological findings are on display in the kibbutz's small museum.

There are also plans to build a 350-apartment holiday resort on Palmachim beach, though this has led to several protests and was delayed.

== See also ==
- Palmachim Airbase
