= Neta'im =

Moshav in central Israel

Neta'im: נְטָעִים (Hebrew)
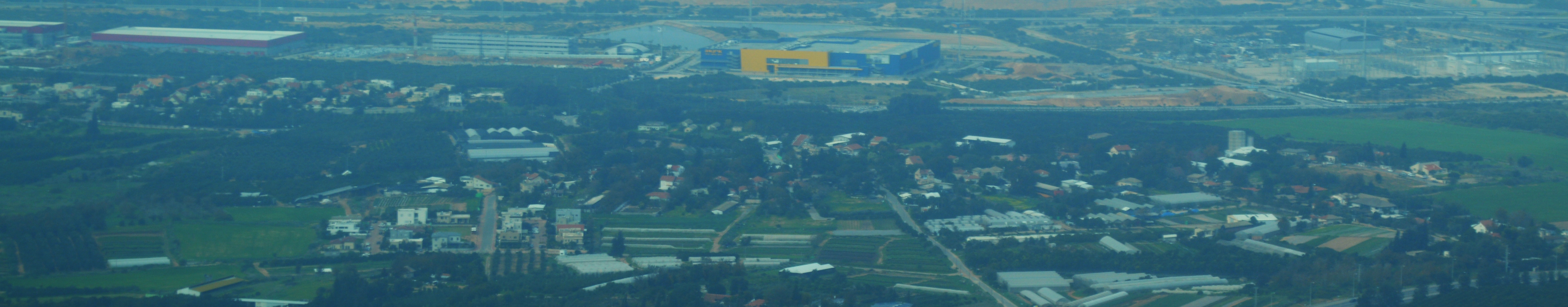

- Location within Central Israel
- Coordinates: 31°56′44″N 34°46′24″E
- Country: Israel
- District: Central
- Subdistrict: Rehovot
- Council: Gan Raveh
- Affiliation: Moshavim Movement
- Founded: 1932
- Founder: Moshavniks
- Population (2024): 720

Neta'im (Hebrew: נְטָעִים, lit. Plantations), is a moshav in central Israel. Located in the coastal plain around 4 kilometres south of Rishon LeZion and covering 1,100 dunams, it falls under the jurisdiction of Gan Raveh Regional Council. In 2024 it had a population of 720.

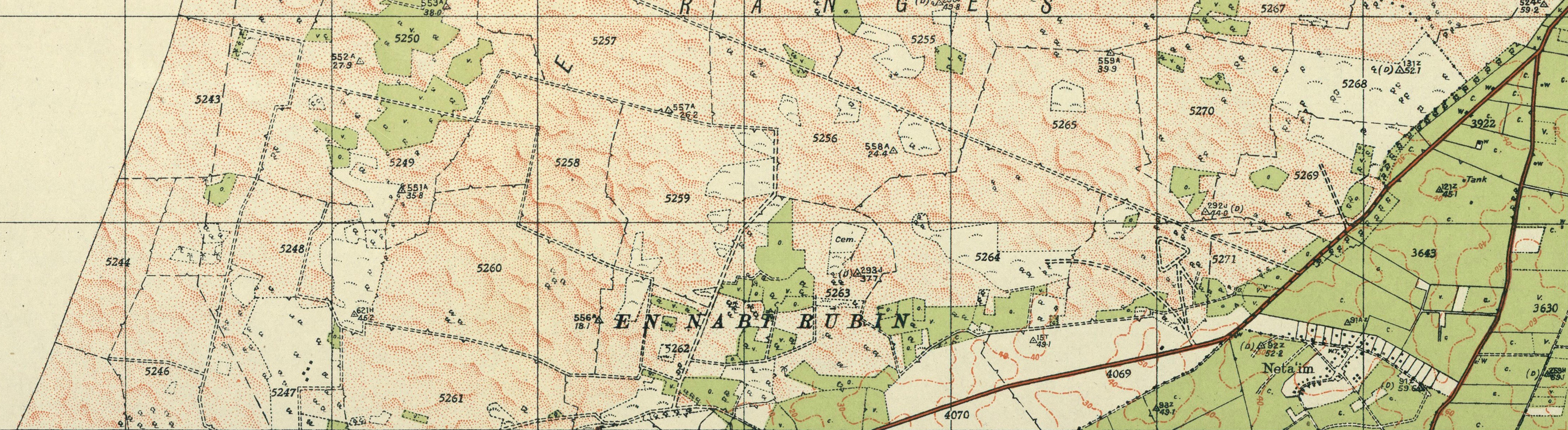
Neta'im 1942 1:20,000

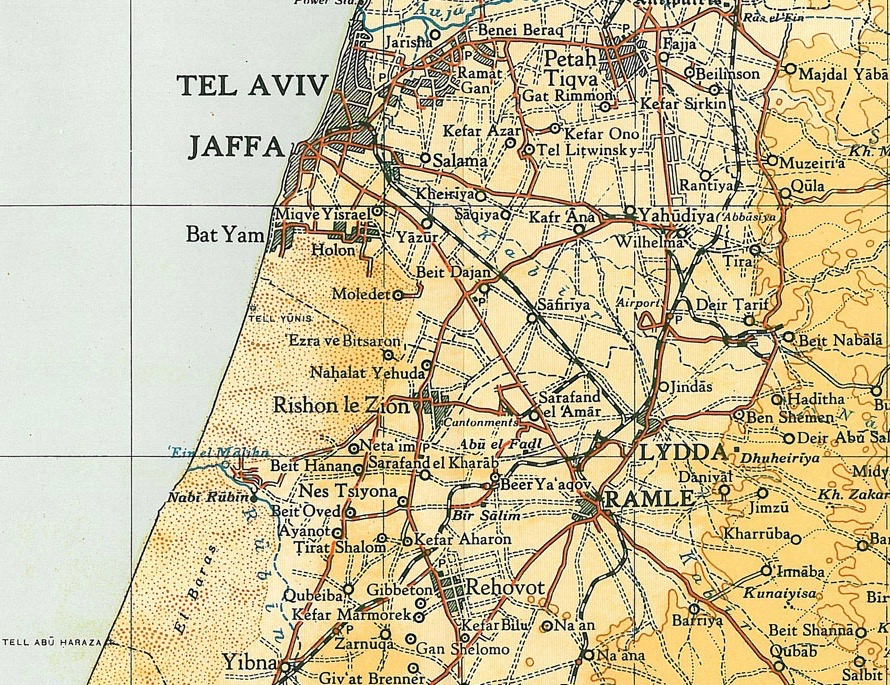
Neta'im 1945 1:250,000 (SW Rishon LeZion)

== History ==
The village was founded in 1932 by residents of other moshavim as part of the Settlement of the Thousand plan. Initially called Kfar HaVatikim (lit. Village of the Veterans), it was later renamed Neta'im, a name taken from 1 Chronicles 4:23:

These were the potters, and those that dwelt among plantations and hedges; there they dwelt occupied in the king's work.
