= Irus, Israel =

Community settlement in central Israel

Irus: אירוס (Hebrew)
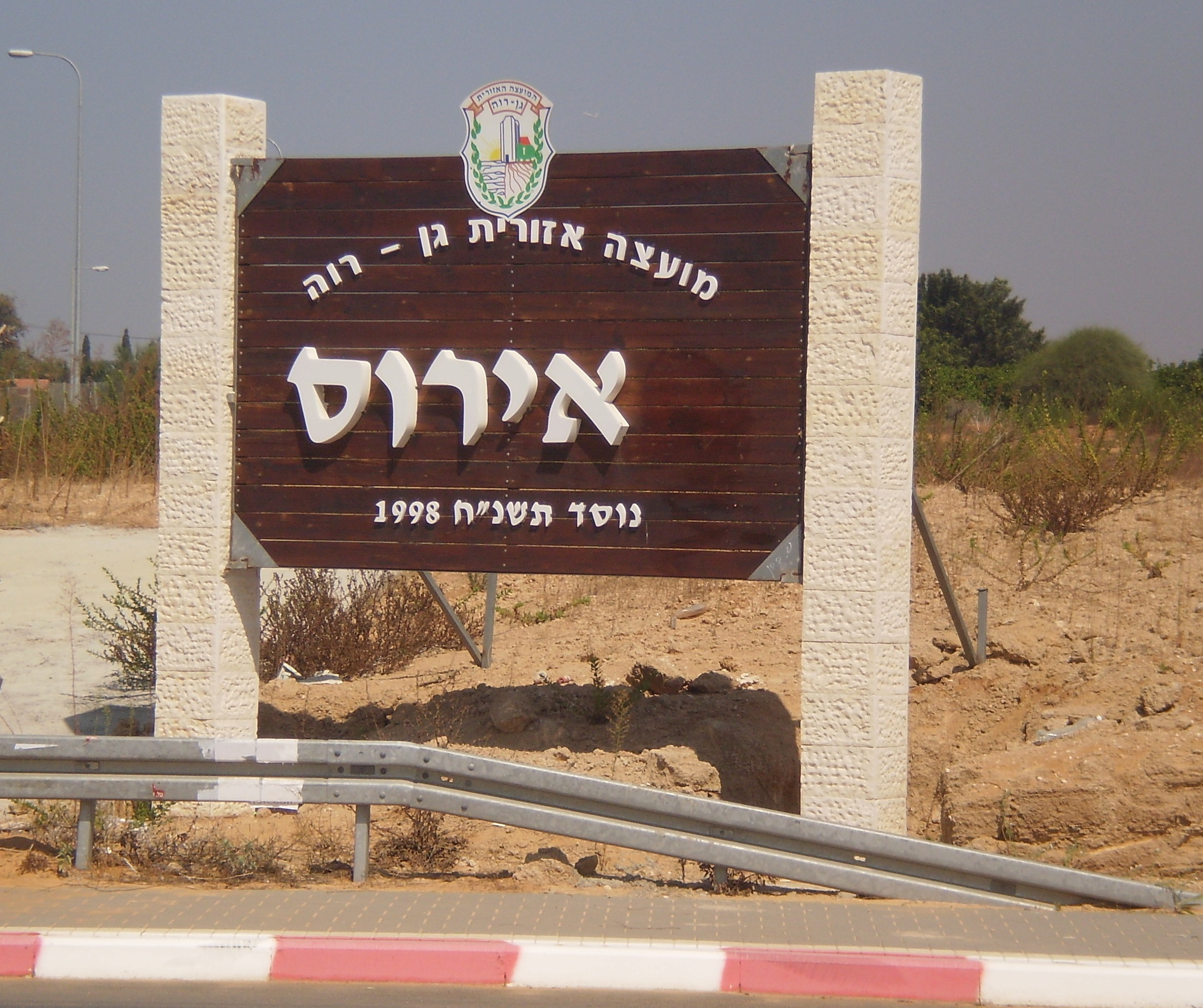

- Location within Central Israel
- Coordinates: 31°55′42″N 34°46′35″E
- Country: Israel
- District: Central
- Subdistrict: Rehovot
- Council: Gan Raveh
- Founded: 2013
- Founder: Bulgarian Jews
- Population (2024): 1,135

Irus (Hebrew: אירוס) is a community settlement in central Israel. Located to the south of Rishon LeZion and west of Nes Ziona, it falls under the jurisdiction of Gan Raveh Regional Council. In 2024 it had a population of 1,135.

== Etymology ==
The village was named after the iris plant indigenous to the area.

== History ==
Bulgarian Jews who were members of the Zionist Organization purchased 388 dunams of land in the 1920s, with the objective of creating a village in which they could settle. However, the plans were not followed through. In 1985 the national council zoned the land for residential use, but their decision was opposed by the regional council. Permits were granted to build a village in 1998, but further objections by the regional council to the plans led to a 17-year delay in construction. The plans were finally approved by a District Court in 2011, with the judge stating "I hope this ruling will be end of the story for this 60 year ordeal." The village was established in 2013.
