= Ramla Natural Region =

Coordinates: 31°55′55″N 34°52′07″E

- Natural Region
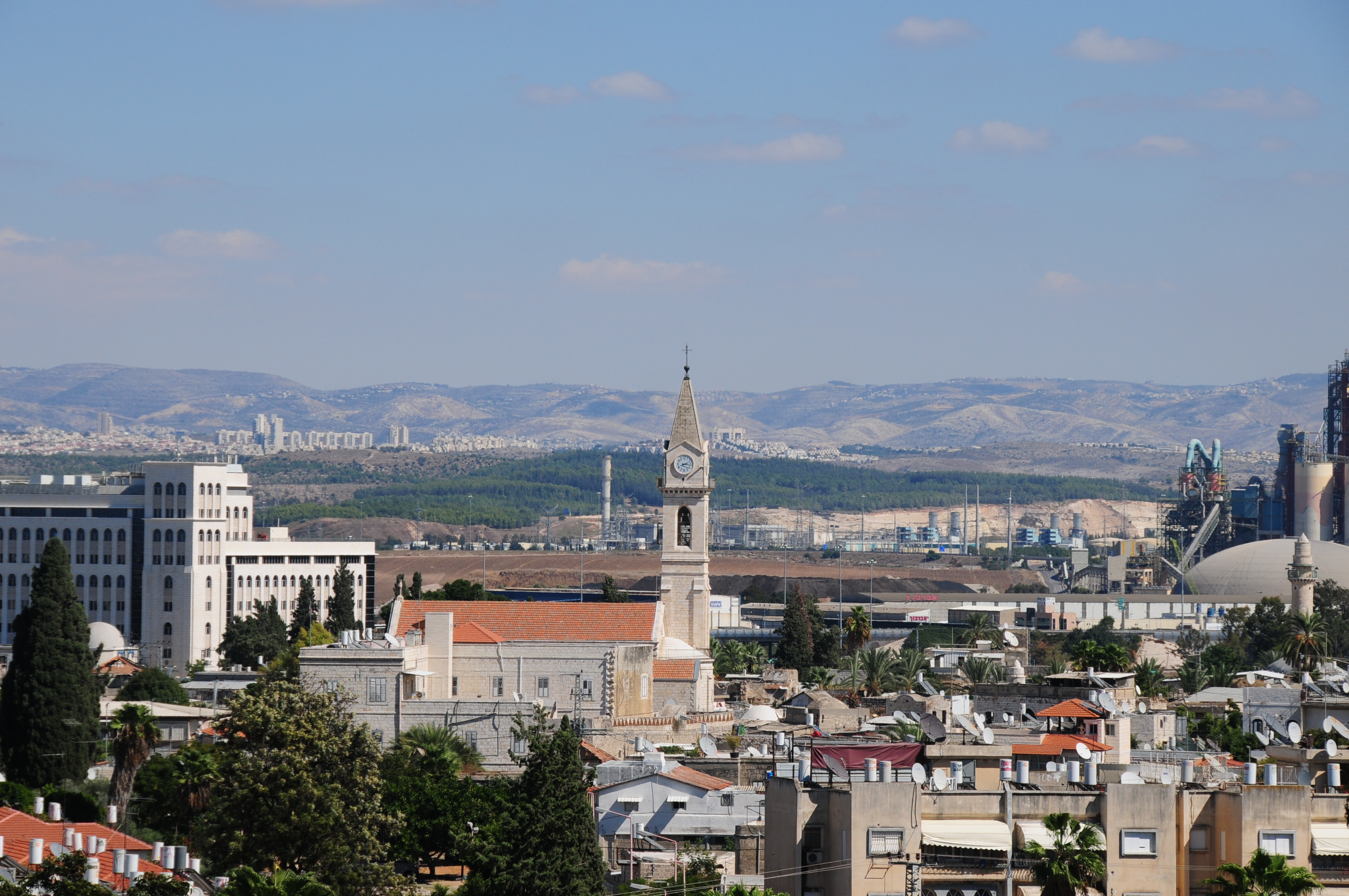
- View of Ramla, namesake of the Ramla Natural Region
- Country: Israel
- District: Central
- Subdistrict: Ramla
- Largest City: Lod

Area
  - Total: 225 km^{2} (87 sq mi)

Population (2024)
  - Total: 296,753

Ethnicity
  - Jews and others: 80.8%
  - Arabs: 16.4%

The Ramla Natural Region is a natural region in the Ramla Subdistrict, in the Central District of Israel. Lod is the largest city in the natural region.

== Geography ==
Districts, Subdistricts and Natural Regions of the State of Israel, 2018

The natural region consists of the neighboring cities of Lod and Ramla, and nearby suburban areas, southeast of Tel Aviv. It extends from Ben Gurion Airport in the north to Highway 7 in the south. It has an area of 225 km^{2}. The two largest cities in the natural region are Lod and Ramla (Lod is slightly larger), which together contain 61 percent of the natural region's population. Two other major towns in the natural region are Be'er Ya'akov and Shoham. The natural region contains portions of the Gezer and Hevel Modi'in regional councils, as well as the entirety of the Sdot Dan Regional Council.

== Demographics ==
A large majority, 80 percent, of the residents of the natural region are Jewish. 16 percent of residents are Arab, concentrated in Lod and Ramla, both of which are mixed cities.

Historical population
Year	Pop.	±%
1972	86,800	—
1983	104,800	+20.7%
1995	144,900	+38.3%
2008	203,120	+40.2%
2022	275,725	+35.7%
2024	296,753	+7.6%

== Administrative local authorities ==
Cities	Local Councils	Villages
Be'er Ya'akov; Lod; Ramla	Beit Dagan; Shoham	Gezer: Azaria; Beit Hashmonai; Beit Uziel; Ganei Hadar; Gezer; Hulda; Karmei Yosef; Kfar Bin Nun; Kfar Shmuel; Matzliah; Mishmar Ayalon; Mishmar David; Na'an; Netzer Sereni; Pedaya; Petahya; Ramot Meir; Sitria; Yad Rambam; Yashresh; Yatzitz; Hevel Modi'in: Ahisamakh; Beit Arif; Beit Nehemia; Ben Shemen; Ben Shemen Youth Village; Ginaton; Hadid; Kfar Truman; Kerem Ben Shemen; Sdot Dan: Ahi'ezer; Ganot; Hemed; Kfar Chabad; Mishmar HaShiv'a; Nir Tzvi; Tzafria; Yagel; Zeitan

== Voting Patterns ==
In the 2022 election, 58 percent of voters in the natural region voted for the parties of the right-wing coalition led by Benjamin Netanyahu, while 30 percent voted for the parties of the center-left coalition led by Yair Lapid and 10 percent voted for the Arab parties.

In the 2026 election, 50 percent of voters in the natural region voted for the parties of the right-wing coalition led by Benjamin Netanyahu, while 30 percent voted for the parties of the center-left coalition led by Gadi Eisenkot and 13 percent voted for the Arab parties. An additional 3.3 percent voted for the Reservists, and 1.8 percent voted for Amcha Yisrael. Voter turnout increased 23 percent from the 2022 election.
