= Highway 44 (Israel) =

Road in Israel

Coordinates: 31°53′13″N 34°53′27″E

Highway 44
- כביש 44
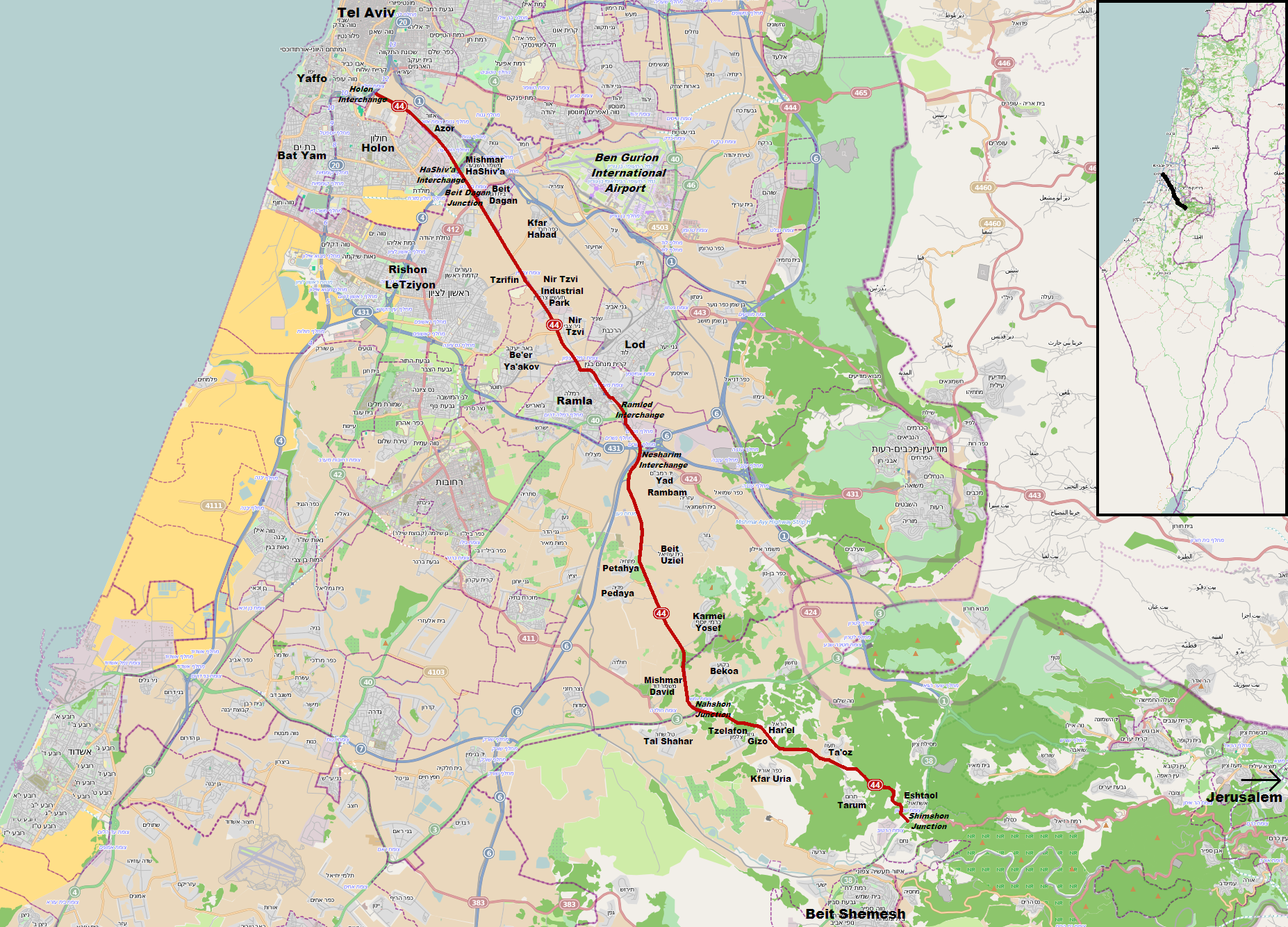

Route information
- Length: 41 km (25 mi)

Major junctions
- Northwest end: Holon Interchange
- HaShiv'a Interchange; Beit Dagan Junction Junction; Ramla North Junction; Ma'asiyahu Junction Junction; Ramlod Interchange; Nesharim Interchange; Nahshon Junction
- Southeast end: Shimshon Junction

Location
- Country: Israel
- Major cities: Tel Aviv-Yafo, Holon, Rishon LeZion, Ramla, Lod, to Beit Shemesh

Highway system
- Roads in Israel; Highways
← Highway 42	→ Highway 45

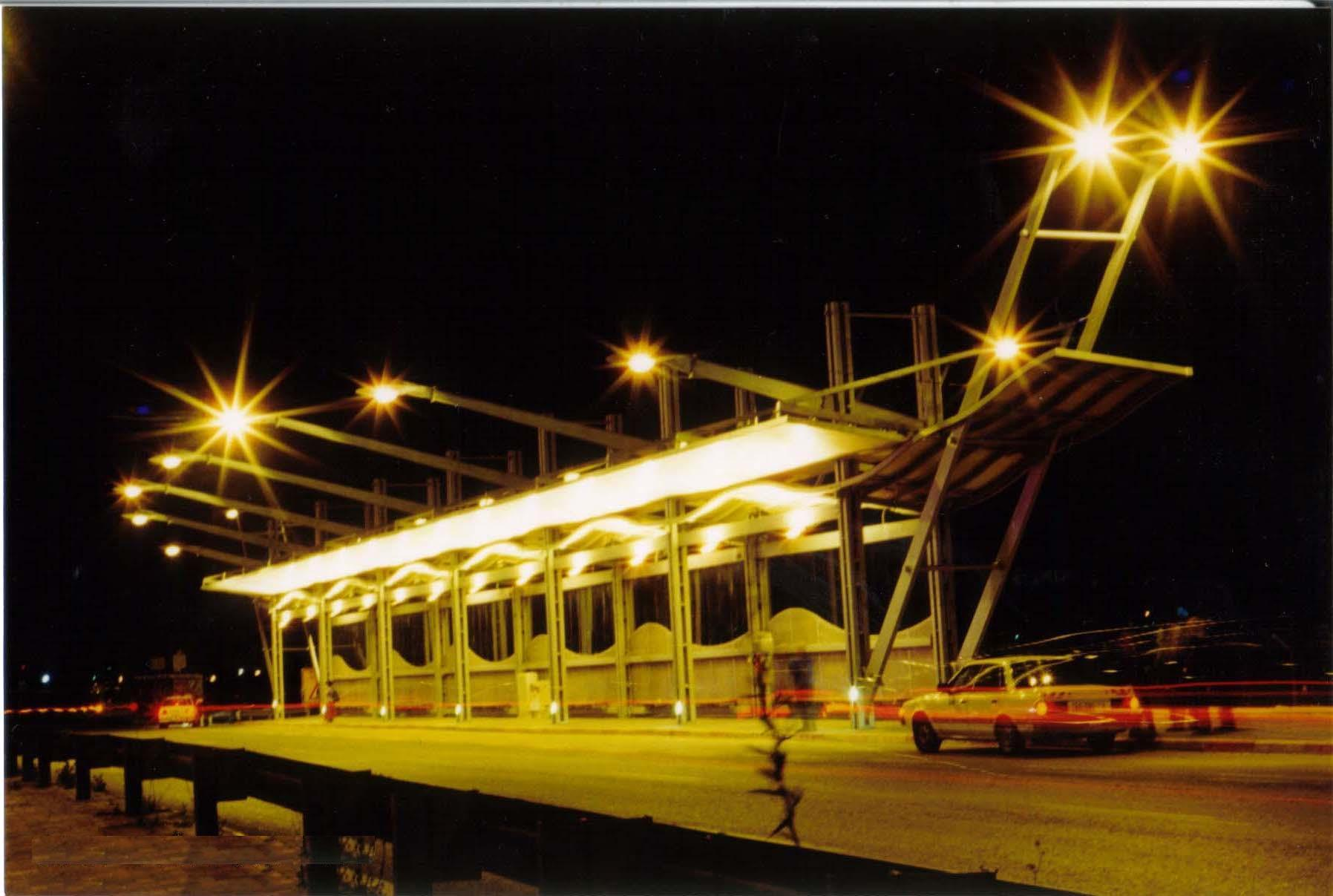
Bus stops on Highway 44 (Israel) near Holon Interchange. Designed by Moti Bodek

Highway 44 is an arterial road in central Israel. It connects Tel Aviv-Yafo and Holon to Ramla, Lod and the Shefela. It is numbered as a north–south road and follows a north-west to south-east path.

== Route description ==
Highway 44 begins in the coastal plain at the south-eastern edge of Tel Aviv at Holon Interchange with the Ayalon Highway. It travels south-easterly, passing Mikve Yisrael, Holon's industrial zones, and Azor. It then crosses Highway 4 at HaShiv'a Interchange. This section is named HaShiv'a Road in memory of seven guards killed in 1948. Southeast of HaShiv'a Interchange the road crosses Beit Dagan Junction with Route 412, which connects it with Rishon Letzion and Yehud. The road then passes the Volkani Institute, the Tzrifin Military base, Assaf HaRofeh Medical Center and various industrial parks.

As Highway 44 enters the municipality of Ramla, it is briefly named Herzl Boulevard. Historically, the road continued straight through beautiful downtown Ramla. Since the mid-1990s, the road makes a left turn at Ramla North Junction onto HaHashmoa'im Street, bypassing Ramla along its northern edge. Just east of Ramla, the road passes Ramlod Interchange with Highway 40 and rejoins the original route, continuing past the Nesher Industrial Zone and the Nesher Cement Factory, one of the most impressive landmarks in the area.

Historically, just past Nesher, the road connected at Gezer Junction with Route 424 to the Gezer Regional Council. That junction was moved 1 km. further south to accommodate Nesharim Interchange with Highway 6 and Route 431. The road then continues past several agricultural communities until Nachshon Junction. Until this point, the road has travelled with almost no changes in elevation, averaging 75 meters above sea level. After Nachshon Junction, it begins a slow ascent into the foothills of the Judean Mountains, passing several more agricultural communities and national forests. The road finally ends at Shimshon Junction with Highway 38.

== History ==
For centuries prior, while Jaffa and its seaport served as the gateway into Palestine, the section of Highway 44 between Jaffa and Ramla formed part of the historic highway connecting Jaffa to Jerusalem and Bethlehem. The historic highway then followed modern highway 424 to Latrun, and continued to Jerusalem along the route of modern Highway 1.

After the establishment of the State, this road operated for many years as one of the main routes connecting the coastal plain with Jerusalem via Highway 38 and Sha'ar HaGai (Bab al-Wad). In 1948, the Latrun section of the old road to Jerusalem (Highway 1) was taken over by Jordan. Traffic between Tel Aviv and Jerusalem was diverted to a new route called "Kvish HaGvura" (Road of Valor) of which Highway 44 served as the connection between Nachshon Junction and Shimshon Junction with Highway 38 leading to Sha'ar HaGai.

== Future ==
The Israel Ministry of Transport has announced a grade separation of Highway 44 with the Lod-Na'an Railway line at HaHashmonain Street adjacent to Ramla North Junction. The road will be raised to pass over the rail line. The estimated completion date is 2014 and the cost will be 160M Shekels.

== Junctions and Interchanges ==
Km	Name	Type	Meaning	Location	Intersecting routes
0	מחלף חולון (Holon Interchange)		named after biblical location (little) sand	Tel Aviv-Yafo, Holon	from Derech Ben-Zvi, Highway 20; Levi Eshkol Blvd
Derech HaShiv'a
2.4				Holon, Azor	HaMakhtesh St.
2.9	צומת אזור (Azor Junction)			Azor	Herzl St.
3.3				Holon	HaMelakha St.
3.7				Azor	Kaplan St.
4.8	מחלף השבעה (HaShiv'a Interchange)		The Seven	Holon, Azor, Mishmar HaShiv'a	Highway 4
5.4	westbound only			Mishmar HaShiv'a	Tzvi Zeira St.
6.1	צומת בית דגן (Beit Dagan Junction)		named after ancient location House of Dagon	Rishon LeZion; Beit Dagan	Route 412
9	צומת כפר חב"ד (Kfar Chabad Junction)		Chabad Village	Kfar Habad	Road 4402
9.7	צומת ראשון מזרח (Rishon Mizrah Junction)		Rishon East	Rishon LeZion	Derech Chaim Herzog
10.4	צומת צריפין (Tzrifin Junction)		named after former location	Tzrifin Military Base, Assaf HaRofeh; Medical Center, Camp Yadin	entrance roads
11.1				Tzrifin; Industrial Park, Sochnut Warehouses	local road
11.7				New Wholesale Market, Kiryat Shlomo; Industrial Park, Nir Tzvi; Industrial Park	local roads
12.7	צומת ניר צבי (Nir Tzvi Junction)		Zvi's Meadow	Be'er Ya'akov, Nir Tzvi	Arava St., Road 4313
14.1	Railway Crossing; 2 tracks			Ramla	
Herzl Boulevard
14.5	צומת רמלה צפון (Ramla North Junction)		Ramla North	Ramla	Herzl Blvd.
HaHashmona'im Street
14.9	Railway Crossing; 2 tracks			Ramla	
15				Ramla; Lod	HaHasmal St. to Yoseftal St.
15.4	north-westbound only			Ramla; Lod	Shmuel Tamir St.
16.4	צומת מעשיהו (Ma'asiyahu Junction) also called צומת תעבורה (Ta'avura Junction)		name for nearby Prison Transport	Ramla; Lod	Route 434 (Tel-Hai St.)
17.2	מחלף רמלוד (Ramlod Interchange)		combination of Ramla and Lod	Ramla; Lod	Highway 40
17.8	south-eastbound only			Ramla (east), al Mahta	Herzl Blvd.
18.1				Nesher; Industrial Zone	Har Atzmon St.
18.7	צומת נשר (Nesher Junction)		Eagle, named after nearby Nesher Cement Factory & ult. Rambam, the great Eagle	Nesher; Cement Factory	
19	מחלף נשרים (Nesharim Interchange)		Eagles	Ramla, Lod, Yad Rambam	Highway 6 Route 431
20	צומת גזר (Gezer Junction)		Carrot	Gezer Regional Council	Route 424
20.4					exit from Highway 6 northbound
22.8	צומת בית אוזיאל (Beit Uziel Junction)		House of Uziel	Beit Uziel	local road
24.3	צומת פתחיה (Petahya Junction)		Entrance of God	Petahya, Pedaya	Road 4243
27.4	צומת כרמי יוסף (Karmei Yosef Junction)		Yosef's Vineyards	Karmei Yosef	Road 4243
30.4	צומת נחשון (Nahshon Junction)		Pioneer (literary Hebrew) named after Operation Nachshon	Mishmar David, Tal Shahar, Bekoa	Highway 3
Derech HaGvura
32	צומת צלפון (Tzelafon Junction)		named after ancient location possibly after Zelelponith ult. Shade come upon me	Tzelafon; Gizo	HaZayit St.
33.2	צומת הראל (Har'el Junction)		named after Harel Brigade ult. Mountain of God	Har'el	Road 4243
34.4	צומת כפר אוריה (Kfar Uria Junction)		ult. remembrance of biblical story of Samson's encounter with the lion at Timnah	Kfar Uria	Road 4243
36.9	צומת תרום (Tarum Junction)		Exalted	Tarum	Road 4243
37.1	צומת תעוז (Ta'oz Junction)		Stronghold	Ta'oz	Road 4243
41.1	צומת שמשון (Shimshon Junction)		Named after biblical character Samson	Eshtaol, Beit Shemesh	Highway 38

== See also ==
- List of highways in Israel
