= Kfar Bin Nun =

Moshav in central Israel

Kfar Bin Nun: כְּפַר בִּן-נוּן (Hebrew); كفر بن نون (Arabic)
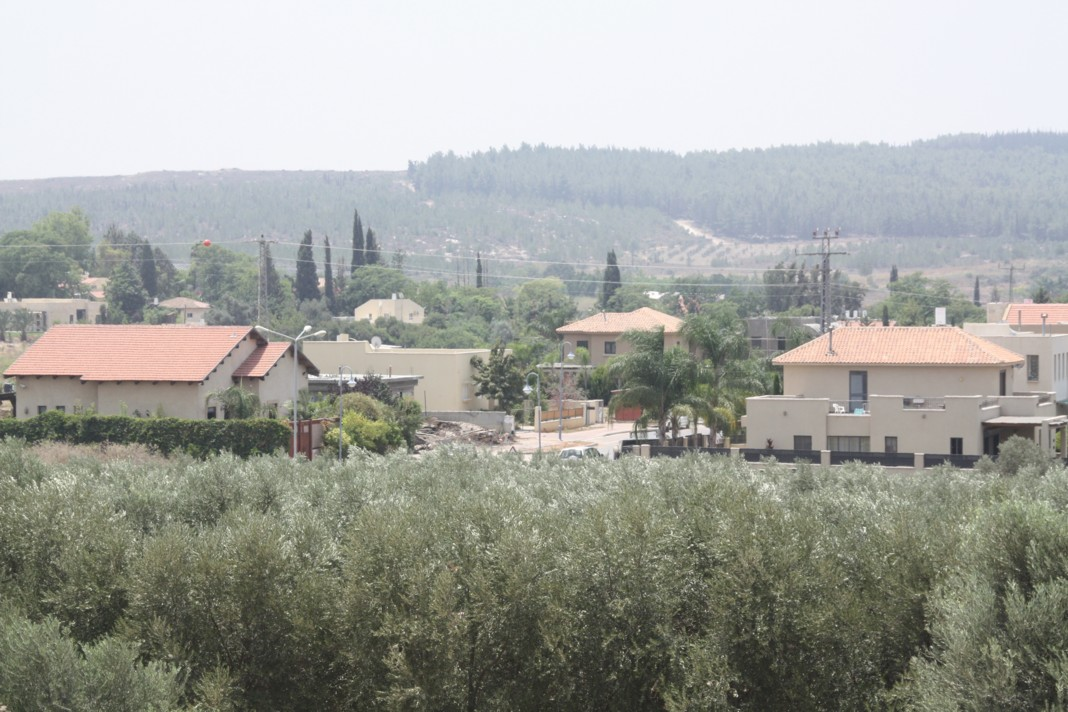

- Location within Central Israel Location within Israel
- Coordinates: 31°51′41″N 34°57′12″E
- Country: Israel
- District: Central
- Subdistrict: Ramla
- Council: Gezer
- Affiliation: Agricultural Union
- Founded: 1952
- Founder: Agricultural Union
- Population (2024): 820

Kfar Bin Nun (Hebrew: כְּפַר בִּן-נוּן, lit. The village of Bin-Nun) is a moshav in central Israel. Located in the Ayalon Valley, it falls under the jurisdiction of Gezer Regional Council. In 2024 it had a population of 820.

== History ==
The moshav was founded in 1952 by the Agricultural Union on land near the depopulated Palestinian village of al-Qubab.

It was initially named Mishmar Ayalon Bet as it was located at the road junction to the existing Mishmar Ayalon, which had been established two years before, but was later renamed Kfar Bin Nun after Operation Bin Nun Bet, which was named after the second name of Joshua (1:1), who fought here in the Ayalon valley (Joshua 10:12).

Until the Six-Day War in 1967, it was classed as a "Sefer settlement", which meant it was entitled to financial compensation for the attacks it suffered due to its proximity to the Jordanian border.
