= Pedaya =

Moshav in central Israel

Pedaya: פדיה (Hebrew)
- Moshav
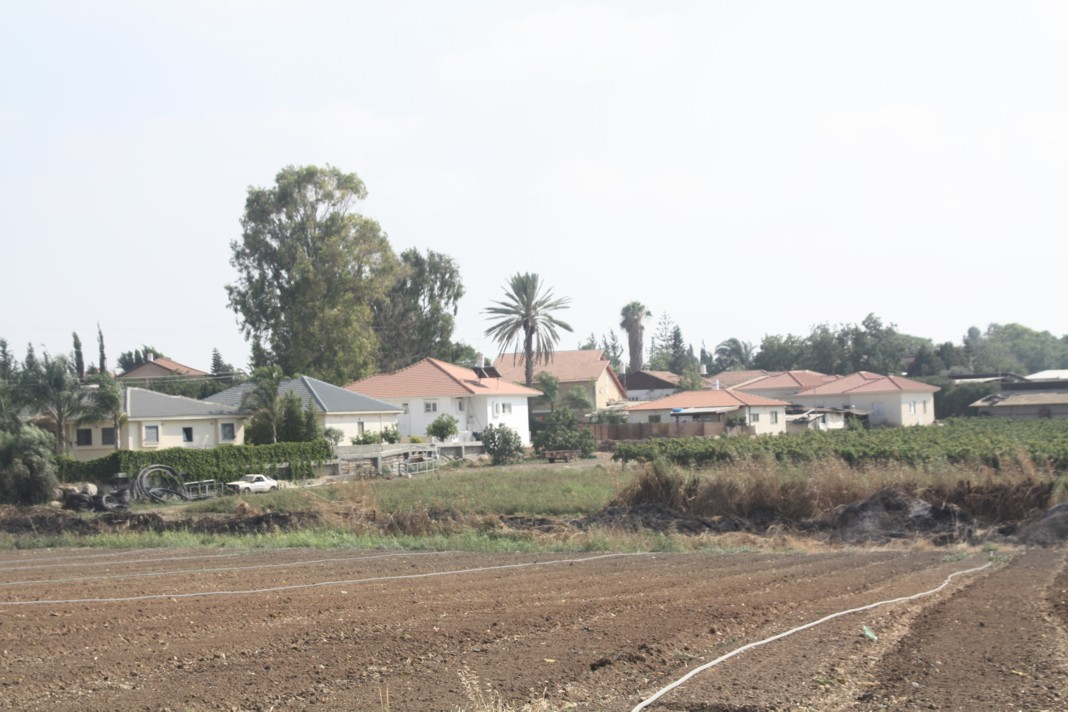
- View of Pedaya

- Location within Central Israel Location within Israel
- Coordinates: 31°51′27″N 34°53′1.31″E
- Country: Israel
- District: Central
- Subdistrict: Ramla
- Council: Gezer
- Affiliation: Moshavim Movement
- Founded: 1951
- Founder: Iraqi Jews
- Population (2024): 988

Pedaya (Hebrew: פדיה) is a moshav in central Israel. Located in the Shephelah near Mazkeret Batya, it falls under the jurisdiction of Gezer Regional Council. In 2024 it had a population of 988.

== History ==
Pedaya was founded in 1951 for immigrants from Iraq and was named for a figure from the Bible mentioned in 2 Kings 23:36:

Jehoiakim was twenty and five years old when he began to reign; and he reigned eleven years in Jerusalem; and his mother's name was Zebudah the daughter of Pedaiah of Rumah.

The moshav is located near the site of the ancient city of Gezer and close to the Palestinian Arab village of Al-Qubab, which was depopulated during the 1948 Arab–Israeli War. The founders worked mainly in agriculture, with orchards, vineyards, and field crops as their primary source of livelihood.

== Notable people ==
- Yuval Raphael (born 2000), singer, songwriter and Israeli Eurovision Song Contest 2025 entrant
