= Khulda =

Khulda خُلدة Khuldeh
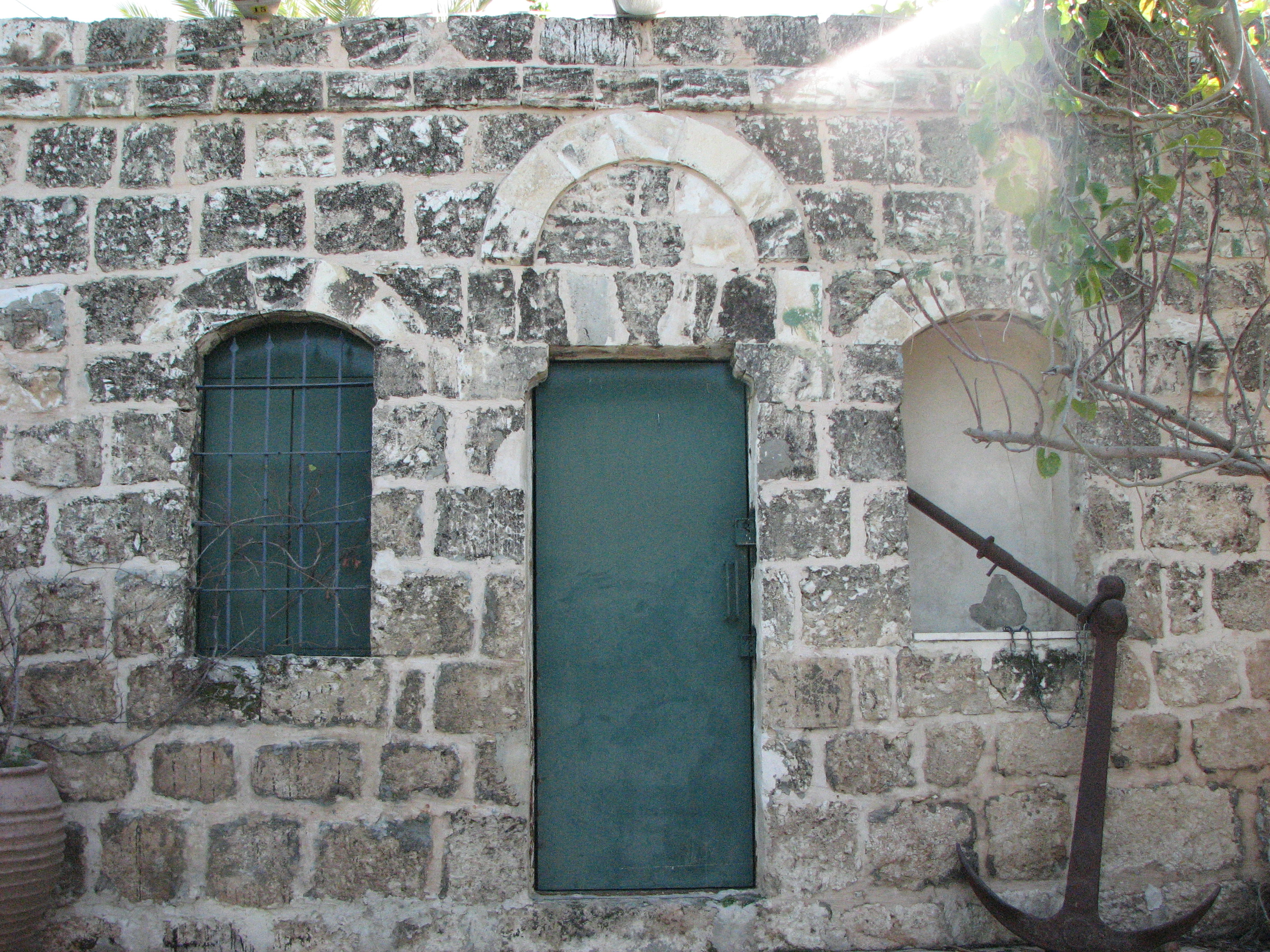
- The largest remaining house in Khulda
- Etymology: "the perpetual"
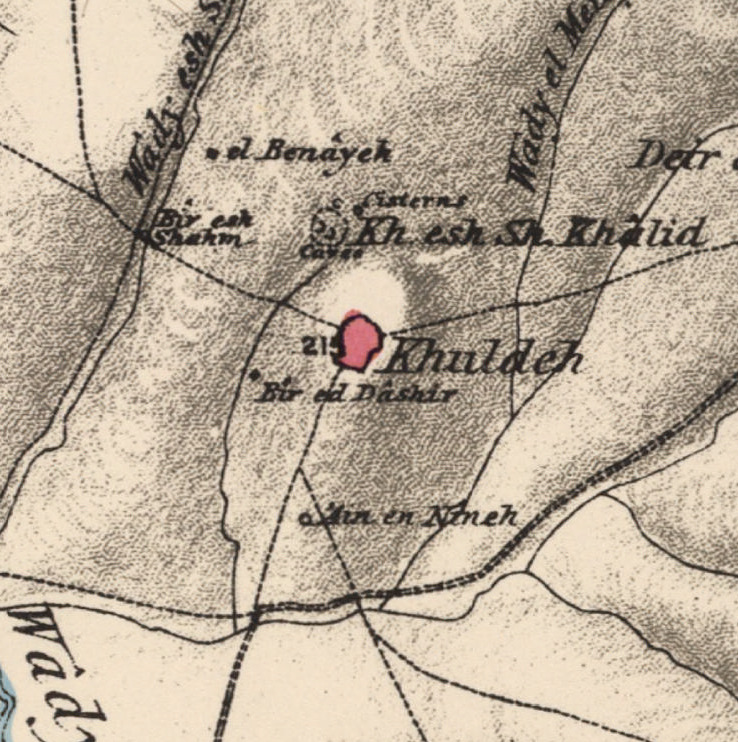
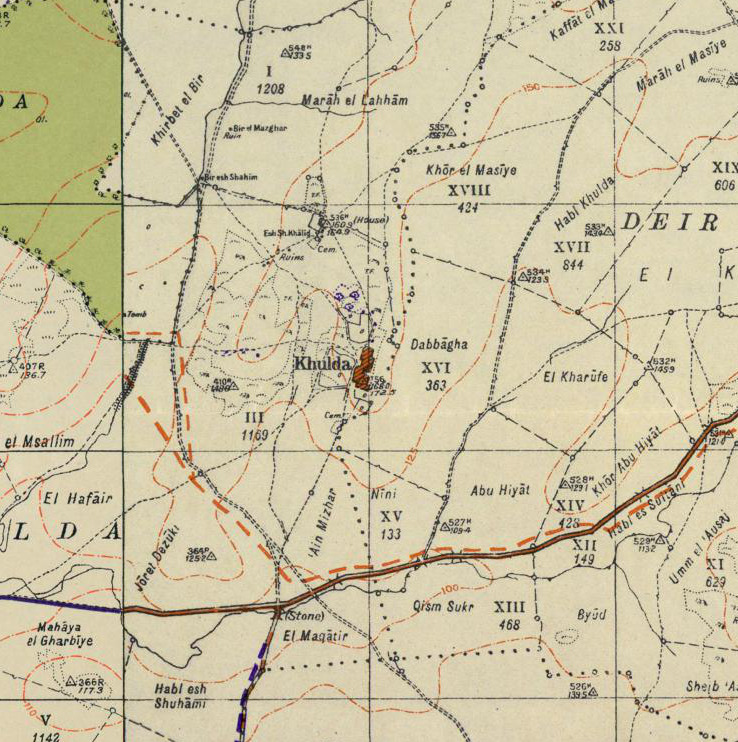
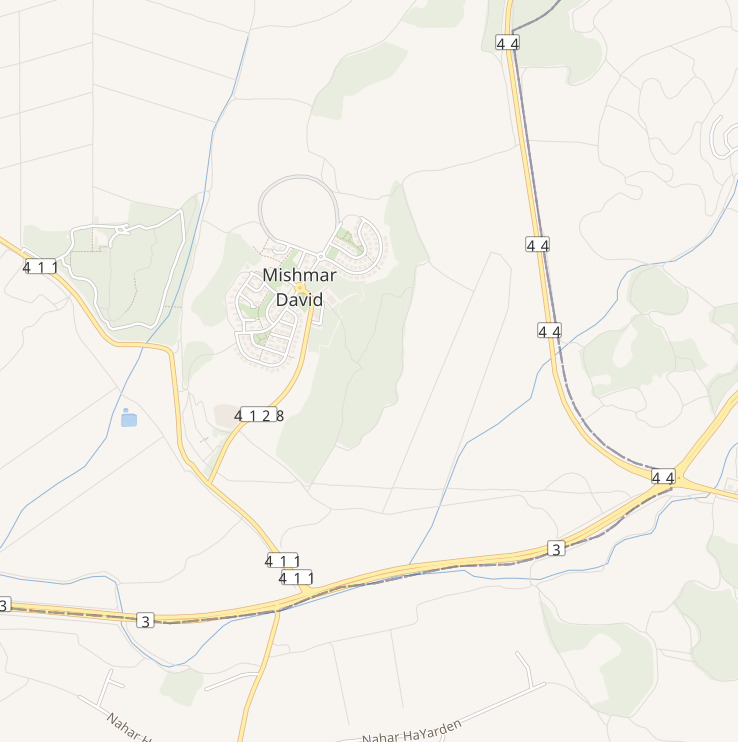
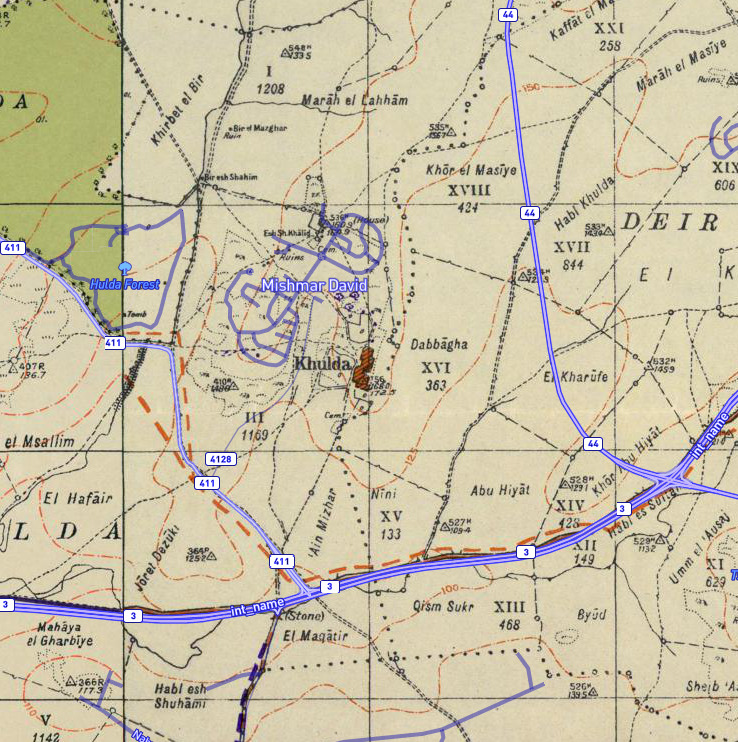
- 1870s map 1940s map modern map 1940s with modern overlay map A series of historical maps of the area around Khulda (click the buttons)

- Location within Mandatory Palestine
- Coordinates: 31°49′10″N 34°54′14″E
- Palestine grid: 141/136
- Geopolitical entity: Mandatory Palestine
- Subdistrict: Ramle
- Date of depopulation: April 6, 1948

Area
  - Total: 9,461 dunams (9.461 km^{2}; 3.653 sq mi)

Population (1945)
  - Total: 280
- Cause(s) of depopulation: Military assault by Yishuv forces
- Current Localities: Mishmar David

Khulda (Arabic: خُلدة), also Khuldeh, was a Palestinian Arab village located 12 kilometers (7.5 mi) south of Ramla in the Mandatory Palestine. Known as Huldre to the Crusaders, it is also mentioned in documents dating to the periods of Mamluk, Ottoman, and Mandatory rule over Palestine. During the 1948 war, the village was depopulated as part of Operation Nachshon and was subsequently destroyed. The Israeli kibbutz of Mishmar David was established that same year on land belonging to the village.

== History ==
Khulda lay close to a highway connecting Gaza to the Ramla-Jerusalem highway. During the Crusades, the village was known as Huldre. Situated 10 kilometers (6.2 mi) west-south-west of Imwas, prior to the 12th century CE, it lay on the border between the Greek archbishopric of Lydda and the ecclesiastical division of Emmaus, the latter of which was governed directly by archpriest of the Patriarch of Jerusalem.

During the period of Mamluk rule over Palestine, Mujir al-Din al-'Ulaymi narrates how the under-Governor of Ramleh in 1495 had to take refuge against marauding Bedouin in a small fort which then existed at Khulda.

=== Ottoman era ===
Khulda, like the rest of Palestine, was incorporated into the Ottoman Empire in 1517 and in 1596, it formed part of the nahiya ("subdistrict") of Ramla, in the liwa of Gaza. It had a population of 12 households, an estimated sixty-six persons, all Muslim. They paid a fixed tax rate of 25% on agricultural products, including wheat, barley, beehives, and goats, in addition to occasional revenues; a total of 4,500 akçe.

When Edward Robinson passed by in 1838, he described Khulda as "a large village" on a hill. It was also noted as a Muslim village in the southern area in the District of Er-Ramleh.

In 1863 Victor Guérin noted a village with two hundred and fifty inhabitants, situated on a plateau.

An official village list of about 1870 showed that the village had 28 houses and a population of 76, though the population count included only men. Charles Simon Clermont-Ganneau visited Khulda in 1871, and was told by the inhabitants that the village used to be surrounded by a fortified wall, two gates of which were still supposed to be in situ. Clermont-Ganneau noted that this agreed well with what Mujir al-Din had written about the place.

In 1882, the PEF's Survey of Western Palestine (SWP) described Khulda as a large village, built of stone and mud, situated on a hill. The village had a masonry well to the east.

=== British Mandate era ===
During British rule over Mandate Palestine, ten labourers from Khulda worked gratis for the Jewish National Fund on the Khulde drainage project, most of which took place on the Arab village's lands. The project, like others of its kind was essential to Jewish settlement in Palestine, as malaria had impeded permanent settlement at Jewish Khulde in 1921.

In the 1922 census of Palestine, Khulda had a population of 53 inhabitants, all Muslims, increasing in the 1931 census to 178, still all Muslims, in 29 inhabited houses.

The villagers maintained a mosque and there were two water wells for domestic use. Villagers in Khulda were engaged in the rearing of animal livestock. The Lydda District had one of the largest animal markets in Palestine, alongside that of the Nazareth District; however, starvation was a common affliction among the herds in the former in the 20th century, and the herd at Khulda was described as 'a typical specimen of extreme debility'.

In the 1945 statistics, the population had grown to 280 Muslims, with a total of 9,461 dunams of land. Of this, a total of 8,994 dunums were used for cereals, 9 dunums were irrigated or used for orchards, while 8 dunams were classified as built-up public areas.

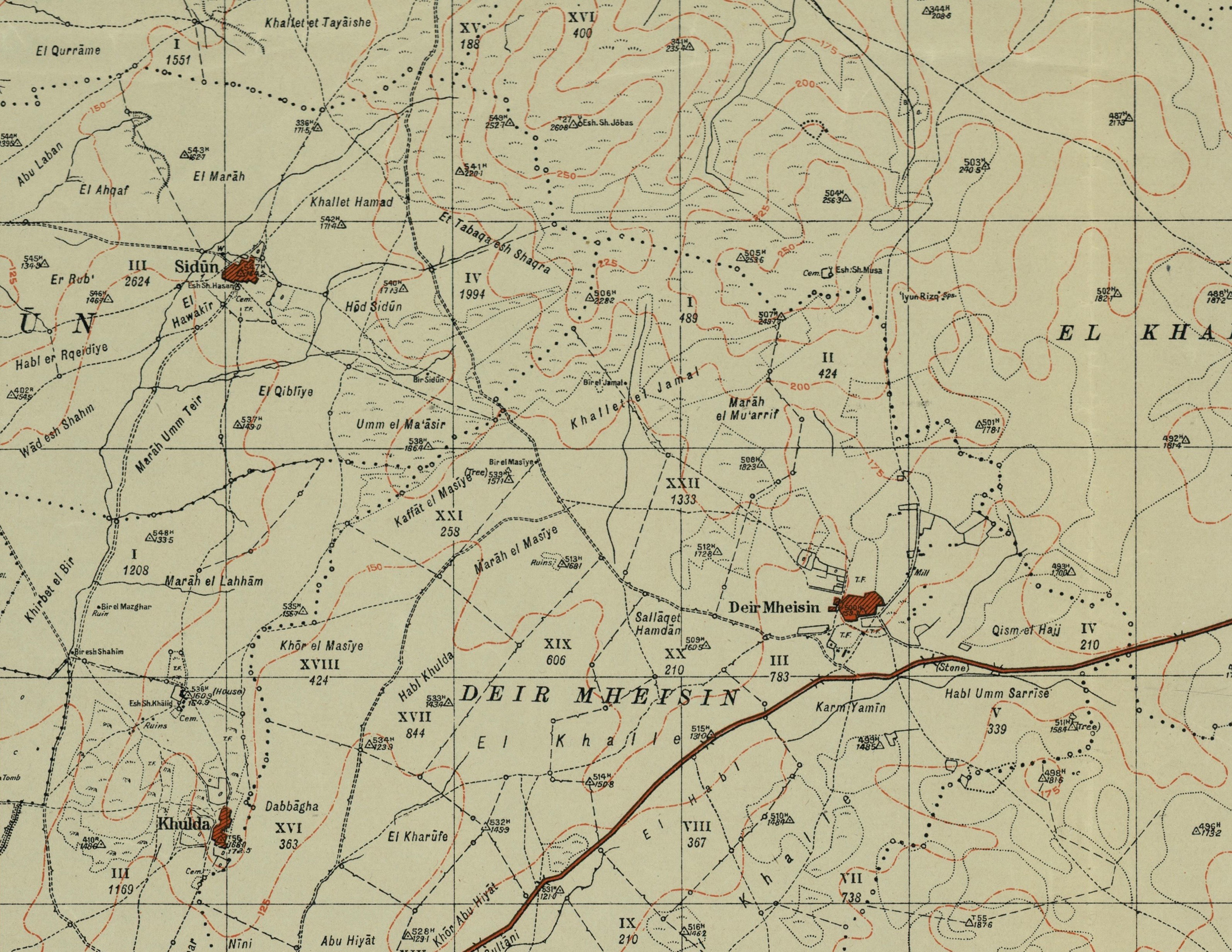
Khulda 1942 1:20,000

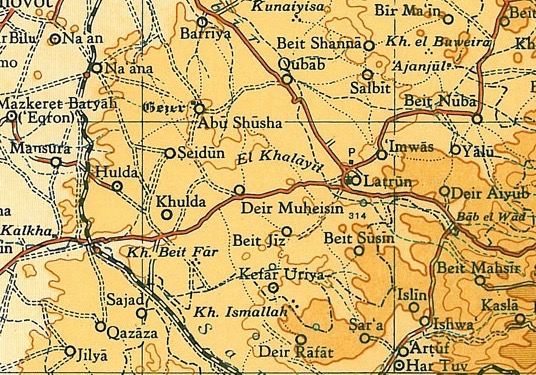
Khulda 1945 1:250,000

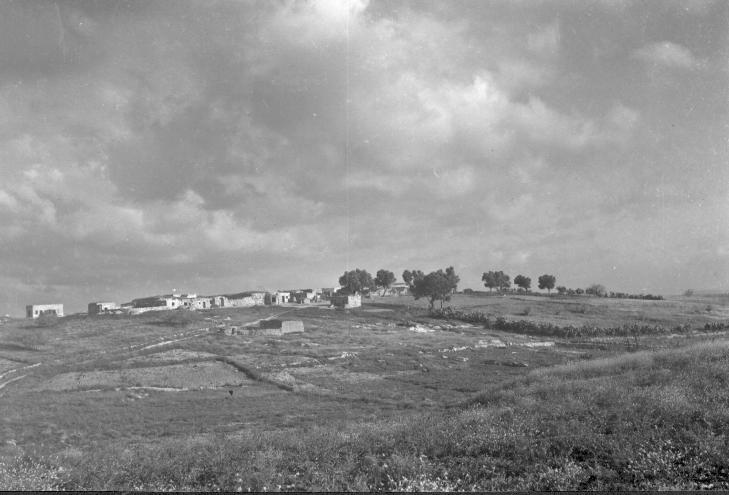
Khulda 1948

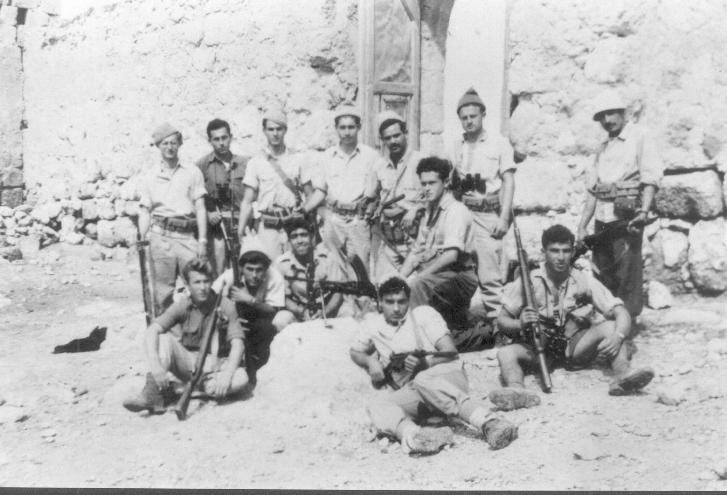
Members of Palmach posing amongst the ruins. Khulda April 1948

=== 1948 and aftermath ===
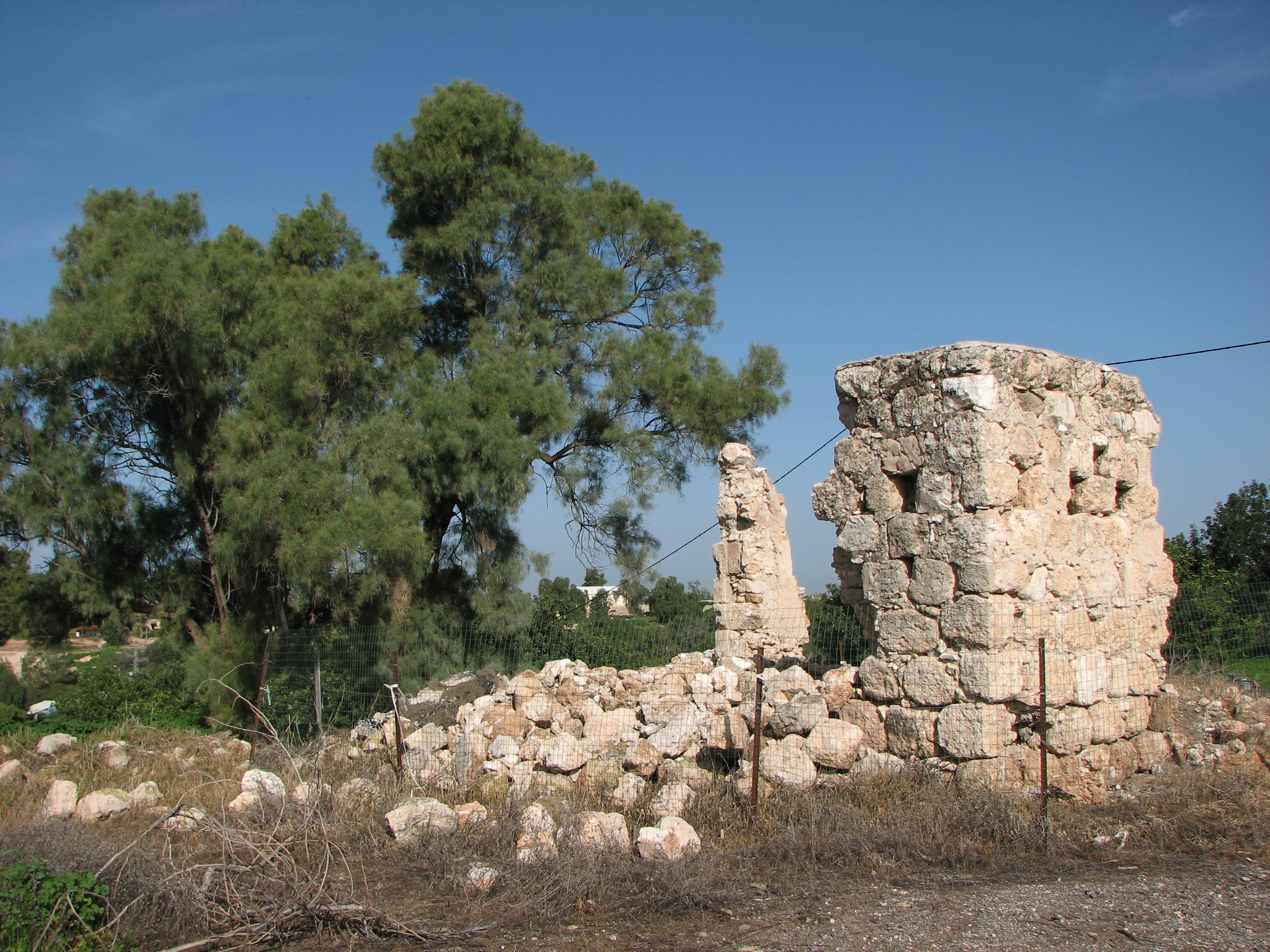
Ruins in Khulda

Prior to the outbreak of the 1948 Arab-Israeli war, Khulda was conquered by Jewish forces on April 6, 1948 during Operation Nachshon. On April 20, 1948 it was leveled by bulldozers.

Kibbutz Mishmar David was established in 1948, about 0.5 km (0.31 mi) west of the village site, on village land. Tal Shachar is nearby, about 2 km (1.2 mi) south of the village site, but it is not on village land.

Andrew Petersen, an archaeologist specializing in Islamic architecture visited Khulda in 1993, and notes that the remains of at least four stone buildings can be seen, although only two of them are standing. The first of these is a rectangular structure (12 m (39 ft) x 6.5 m (21 ft)) with two separate rooms, each with its own entrance. Each door is flanked with two large windows. Both doors and windows are covered with lintels, above which is a relieving arch. An inscription above one of the doors have been removed. The roof is made with iron girders, with reinforced concrete, while the walls are dressed limestone. According to Petersen, the building must have served some public purpose, and it probably dates from the final years of the Ottoman rule, or the early British Mandate of Palestine period.

The second building stands north of first one, and is about half in size (6 m x 6 m). The roof is made in the same manner as the first house. The walls are made of boulders and rubble stone, joined together with mud mortar. A shallow niche in the south wall might be a mihrab. The walls are decorated with stencilled friezes of palm tree and palmettes in blue-green. A barely legible inscription above the door gives a 14th-century AH (late 19th-century CE) date.

== Bibliography ==
- Barron, J.B., ed. (1923). Palestine: Report and General Abstracts of the Census of 1922. Government of Palestine.
- Clermont-Ganneau, C.S. (1896). [ARP] Archaeological Researches in Palestine 1873-1874, translated from the French by J. McFarlane. Vol. 2. London: Palestine Exploration Fund.
- Conder, C.R.; Kitchener, H.H. (1882). The Survey of Western Palestine: Memoirs of the Topography, Orography, Hydrography, and Archaeology. Vol. 2. London: Committee of the Palestine Exploration Fund.
- Conder, C.R. (2009), The Survey of Western Palestine: Arabic and English Name Lists Collected During the Survey, BiblioBazaar, LLC, ISBN 978-1-113-17340-9
- Department of Statistics (1945). Village Statistics, April, 1945. Government of Palestine.
- El-Eini, Roza (2006), Mandated landscape: British imperial rule in Palestine, 1929-1948 (Illustrated ed.), Routledge, ISBN 978-0-7146-5426-3
- Guérin, V. (1869). Description Géographique Historique et Archéologique de la Palestine (in French). Vol. 1: Judee, pt. 2. Paris: L'Imprimerie Nationale.
- Hadawi, S. (1970). Village Statistics of 1945: A Classification of Land and Area ownership in Palestine. Palestine Liberation Organization Research Center. Archived from the original on 2018-12-08.
- Hartmann, M. (1883). "Die Ortschaftenliste des Liwa Jerusalem in dem türkischen Staatskalender für Syrien auf das Jahr 1288 der Flucht (1871)". Zeitschrift des Deutschen Palästina-Vereins. 6: 102–149.
- Hütteroth, W.-D.; Abdulfattah, K. (1977). Historical Geography of Palestine, Transjordan and Southern Syria in the Late 16th Century. Erlanger Geographische Arbeiten, Sonderband 5. Erlangen, Germany: Vorstand der Fränkischen Geographischen Gesellschaft. ISBN 3-920405-41-2.
- Khalidi, W. (1992). All That Remains: The Palestinian Villages Occupied and Depopulated by Israel in 1948. Washington D.C.: Institute for Palestine Studies. ISBN 0-88728-224-5.
- Mills, E., ed. (1932). Census of Palestine 1931. Population of Villages, Towns and Administrative Areas. Jerusalem: Government of Palestine.
- Morris, B. (2004). The Birth of the Palestinian Refugee Problem Revisited. Cambridge University Press. ISBN 978-0-521-00967-6.
- Moudjir ed-dyn (1876). Sauvaire (ed.). Histoire de Jérusalem et d'Hébron depuis Abraham jusqu'à la fin du XVe siècle de J.-C. : fragments de la Chronique de Moudjir-ed-dyn.
- Palmer, E.H. (1881). The Survey of Western Palestine: Arabic and English Name Lists Collected During the Survey by Lieutenants Conder and Kitchener, R. E. Transliterated and Explained by E.H. Palmer. Committee of the Palestine Exploration Fund.
- Petersen, Andrew (2001). A Gazetteer of Buildings in Muslim Palestine: Volume I (British Academy Monographs in Archaeology). Oxford University Press. ISBN 978-0-19-727011-0. Archived from the original on 2021-05-28.
- Pringle, D. (1993). The Churches of the Crusader Kingdom of Jerusalem: A-K (excluding Acre and Jerusalem). Vol. I. Cambridge University Press. ISBN 0-521-39036-2.
- Robinson, E.; Smith, E. (1841). Biblical Researches in Palestine, Mount Sinai and Arabia Petraea: A Journal of Travels in the year 1838. Vol. 3. Boston: Crocker & Brewster.
- Socin, A. (1879). "Alphabetisches Verzeichniss von Ortschaften des Paschalik Jerusalem". Zeitschrift des Deutschen Palästina-Vereins. 2: 135–163.
- Sufian, Sandra (1993). Healing the Land and the Nation: Malaria and the Zionist Project in Palestine, 1920-1947. Chicago: University of Chicago Press. ISBN 0-226-77935-1.
