= Yatzitz =

Yatzitz: יָצִיץ (Hebrew)
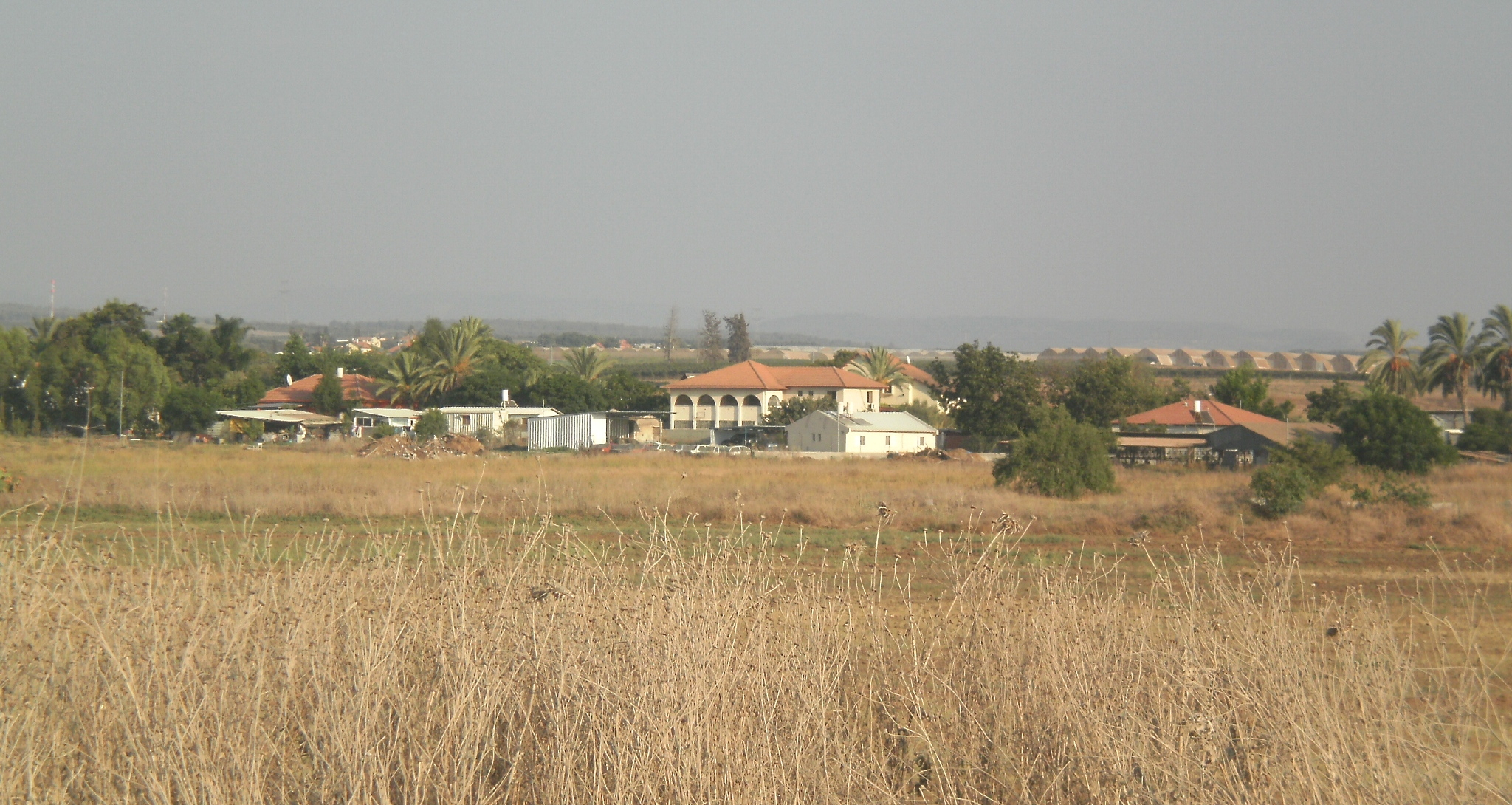

- Location within Central Israel Location within Israel
- Coordinates: 31°51′38″N 34°51′39″E
- Country: Israel
- District: Central
- Subdistrict: Ramla
- Council: Gezer
- Affiliation: Moshavim Movement
- Founded: 1950
- Founder: Libyan immigrants
- Population (2024): 1,086

Yatzitz (Hebrew: יָצִיץ, lit. [He] shall blossom) is a moshav in central Israel. Located in the Shephelah around seven kilometres south of Ramle and covering roughly 2,000 dunams, it falls under the jurisdiction of Gezer Regional Council. In 2024 it had a population of 1,086.

== History ==
The moshav was founded in 1950 by immigrants from Tripoli in Libya. Like neighbouring Yashresh, its name is taken from Isaiah 27:6;

In days to come shall Jacob take root, Israel shall blossom and bud; and the face of the world shall be filled with fruitage.
