= Ganei Hadar =

Community settlement in central Israel

Ganei Hadar: גַּנֵּי הָדָר (Hebrew)
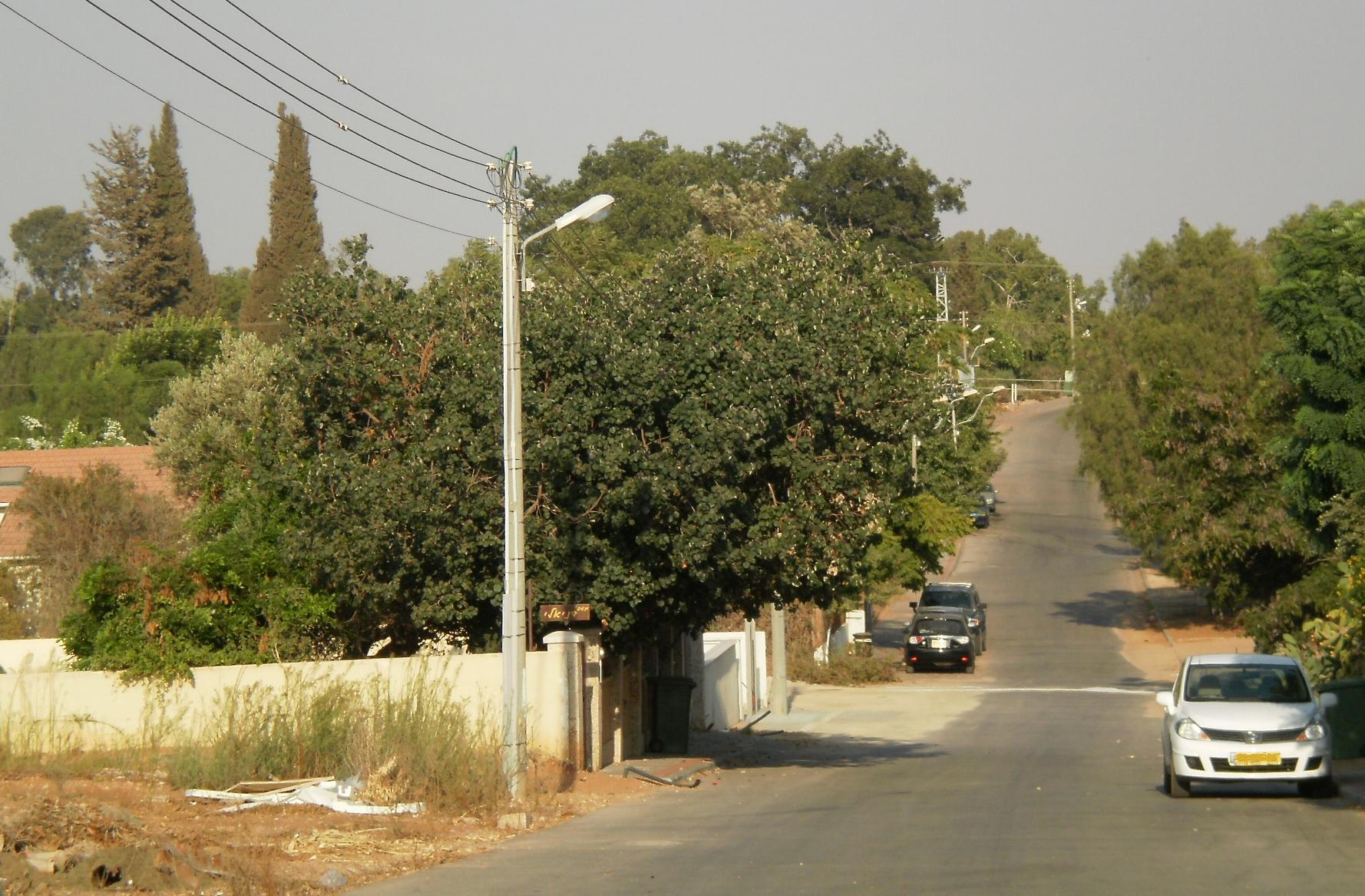
- Street in Ganei Hadar

- Location within Central Israel
- Coordinates: 31°52′44″N 34°51′13″E
- Country: Israel
- District: Central
- Subdistrict: Ramla
- Council: Gezer
- Founded: 1930
- Founder: American immigrants
- Population (2024): 387

Ganei Hadar (Hebrew: גַּנֵּי הָדָר, lit. 'Hadar Gardens') is a community settlement in central Israel. Located in the Shephelah near Rehovot, it falls under the jurisdiction of Gezer Regional Council. In 2024 it had a population of 387.

== History ==
The village was founded in 1930 by immigrants from the United States, who founded the "Gan Hadar – Co-operation" union. The land had been bought by union members from the Arab village of al-Na'ani during the late 1920s, and was the first Jewish settlement in the Gezer region.
