= Yashresh =

Yashresh: יַשְׁרֵשׁ (Hebrew)
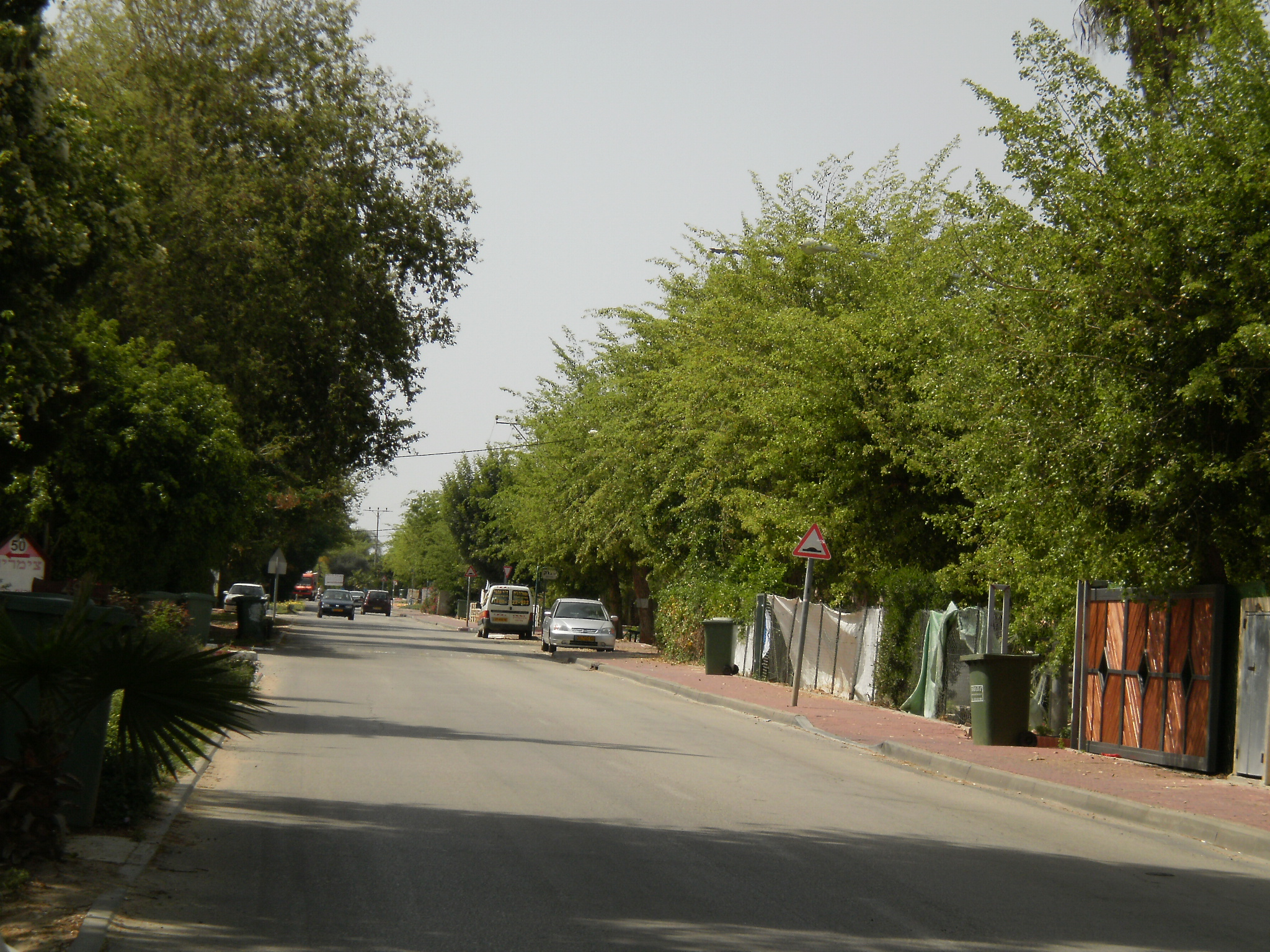

- Location within Central Israel
- Coordinates: 31°54′55″N 34°50′48″E
- Country: Israel
- District: Central
- Subdistrict: Ramla
- Council: Gezer
- Affiliation: Moshavim Movement
- Founded: 1950
- Founder: Moroccan immigrants
- Population (2024): 1,145

Yashresh (Hebrew: יַשְׁרֵשׁ, lit. '[He] shall take root') is a moshav in central Israel. Located in the Shephelah around three kilometres south of Ramle and covering roughly 500 dunams, it falls under the jurisdiction of Gezer Regional Council. In 2024 it had a population of 1,145.

== History ==
The moshav was founded in 1950 by immigrants from Morocco. Like neighbouring Yatzitz, its name is taken from Isaiah 27:6;

In days to come shall Jacob take root, Israel shall blossom and bud; and the face of the world shall be filled with fruitage.
