= Matzliah =

Moshav in central Israel

Matzliah: מַצְלִיחַ (Hebrew)
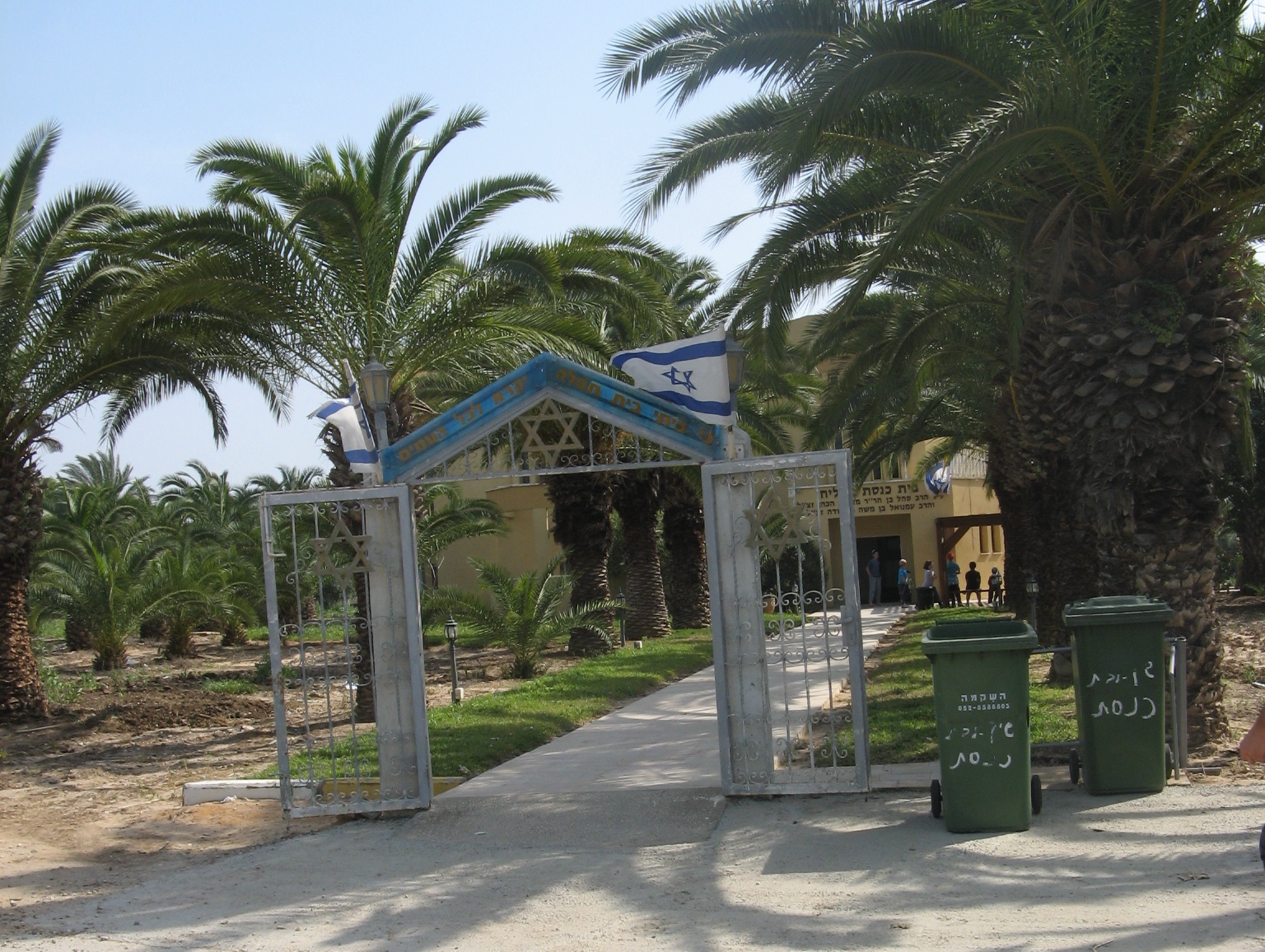
- Karaite Synogauge in Matzliach

- Location within Central Israel
- Coordinates: 31°54′28″N 34°52′26″E
- Country: Israel
- District: Central
- Subdistrict: Ramla
- Council: Gezer
- Affiliation: Moshavim Movement
- Founded: 1950
- Founder: Egyptian Karaite Jews
- Population (2024): 1,478

Matzliah (Hebrew: מַצְלִיחַ, lit. 'Successful') is a moshav in central Israel. Located in the Shfela around two kilometres south of Ramla, it falls under the jurisdiction of Gezer Regional Council. In 2024 it had a population of 1,478.

== History ==
The moshav was founded in 1950 by Karaite Jews from Egypt, and was named after Sahl ben Matzliah, a Karaite philosopher and writer.
