= Azaria =

Moshav in central Israel

Azaria: עֲזַרְיָה (Hebrew)
- Location within Central Israel Location within Israel
- Coordinates: 31°53′21″N 34°54′35″E
- Country: Israel
- District: Central
- Subdistrict: Ramla
- Council: Gezer
- Affiliation: Moshavim Movement
- Founded: 30 October 1949
- Founder: Jerusalemites
- Population (2024): 1,352
- Website: www.azarya.org

Azaria (Hebrew: עֲזַרְיָה) or Azarya is a moshav in central Israel. Located in the Shephelah around five kilometres south-east of Ramle, it falls under the jurisdiction of Gezer Regional Council. In 2024 it had a population of 1,352.

== Etymology ==
Its name is symbolic, though there is a theory that it was named after Azariah of Judah. The symbolic meaning is an acronym from the Hebrew religious sentence 'עולי זאכו ראו ישועת ה (Oleh zakho ra'u yeshuat HaShem, lit. "Immigrants of Zakho (village in Kurdistan) saw the salvation of the Lord").

== History ==
The moshav was established on land near the depopulated Palestinian village of Al-Barriyya on 30 October 1949 by 25 families from Jerusalem as part of the "From the city to the village" plan.
