= Ganei Yohanan =

Moshav in central Israel

Ganei Yohanan: גַּנֵּי יוֹחָנָן (Hebrew)
- Location within Central Israel
- Coordinates: 31°51′31″N 34°50′19″E
- Country: Israel
- District: Central
- Subdistrict: Rehovot
- Council: Gezer
- Affiliation: Moshavim Movement
- Founded: 1950
- Founder: Romanian Jews
- Population (2024): 775

Ganei Yohanan (Hebrew: גַּנֵּי יוֹחָנָן, lit. 'Yohanan Gardens') is a moshav in central Israel. Located in the Shephelah near Rehovot, it falls under the jurisdiction of Gezer Regional Council. In 2024 it had a population of 775.

== History ==
The moshav was founded in 1950 by immigrants from Romania on lands near the Palestinian village of Aqir, and was named after Yohanan Kreminitsky. The founders were later joined by immigrants from Tripoli in Libya.
