= Kfar Shmuel =

Moshav in central Israel

Kfar Shmuel: כְּפַר שְׁמוּאֵל (Hebrew)
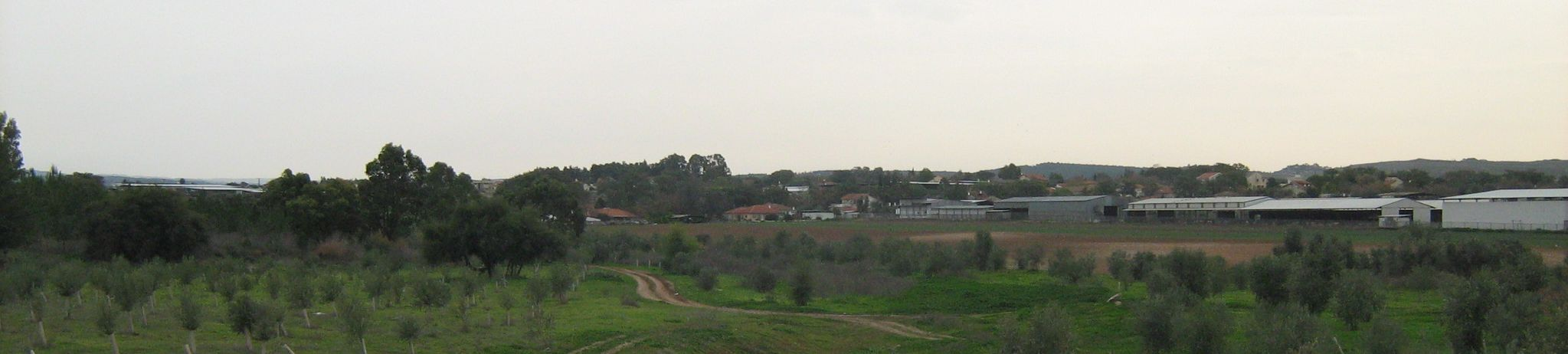

- Location within Central Israel
- Coordinates: 31°53′22″N 34°55′54″E
- Country: Israel
- District: Central
- Subdistrict: Ramla
- Council: Gezer
- Affiliation: HaOved HaTzioni
- Founded: 4 January 1950
- Founder: Romanian-Jewish immigrants
- Population (2024): 983

Kfar Shmuel (Hebrew: כְּפַר שְׁמוּאֵל, lit. 'Shmuel Village') is a moshav in central Israel. Located in the Shephelah around six kilometres south of Ramle, it falls under the jurisdiction of Gezer Regional Council. In 2024 it had a population of 983.

== History ==
=== Ancient ===
Nearby sites such as Tel Gezer and Ekron were major urban centres during the Canaanite and Philistine periods. Archaeological evidence from the broader region suggests widespread rural settlement, with remains of wine presses, cisterns and agricultural terraces dating back to the Iron Age, reflecting a strong Israelite presence during the period of the First Temple (c. 10th–6th centuries BCE).

=== Modern ===
The moshav was founded on 4 January 1950 by immigrants from Romania on land located near the depopulated Palestinian village of Innaba, which was occupied by Israeli forces on 10 July 1948. It was named after Stephen Samuel (Shmuel) Wise, an American Reform rabbi and Zionist leader.

== See also ==
- HaNoar HaTzioni
