= Yad Rambam =

Moshav in central Israel

Yad Rambam: יַד רַמְבַּ״ם (Hebrew)
- Location within Central Israel Location within Israel
- Coordinates: 31°53′59″N 34°53′59″E
- Country: Israel
- District: Central
- Subdistrict: Ramla
- Council: Gezer
- Affiliation: Hapoel HaMizrachi
- Founded: 30 October 1955
- Founder: Moroccan immigrants
- Population (2024): 1,246

Yad Rambam (Hebrew: יַד רַמְבַּ״ם, lit. 'Rambam Memorial') is a moshav in central Israel. Located in the Shephelah near Ramle, it falls under the jurisdiction of Gezer Regional Council. In 2024 it had a population of 1,246.

== History ==
The moshav was founded on 30 October 1955 and was named after the medieval philosopher Maimonides (known in Hebrew as Rambam). Most of the founders were Jewish immigrants from Fes in Morocco.

== Notable people ==
- Jo Amar
