= Mishmar David =

Community settlement in central Israel

Mishmar David: מִשְׁמַר דָּוִד (Hebrew)
- Etymology: David's Guard
- Location within Central Israel Location within Israel
- Coordinates: 31°49′22″N 34°54′8″E
- Country: Israel
- District: Central
- Subdistrict: Ramla
- Council: Gezer
- Affiliation: Kibbutz Movement
- Founded: 1948
- Founder: Romanian Jews
- Population (2024): 1,414

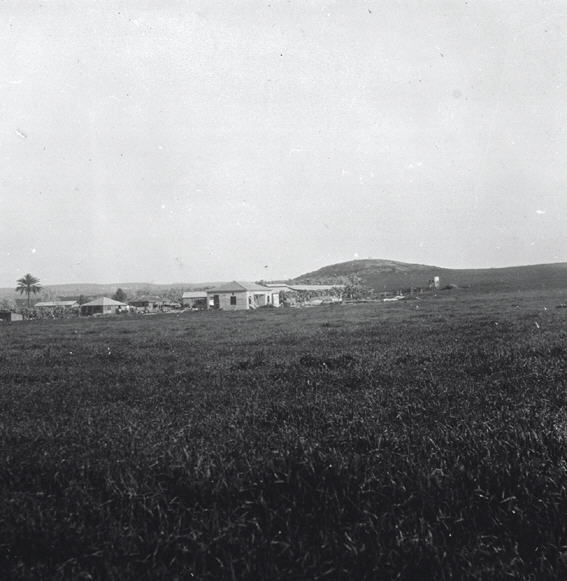
Location of the kibbutz in 1932

Mishmar David (Hebrew: מִשְׁמַר דָּוִד, lit. David's Guard) is a community settlement in central Israel. Located in the Shephelah near Mazkeret Batya, it falls under the jurisdiction of Gezer Regional Council. In 2024 it had a population of 1,414. In 2003 it became the first kibbutz to be privatised.

== History ==
The village was founded as a kibbutz in 1948 by Holocaust survivors from Romania and former soldiers, and was named after David Marcus, a United States Army colonel of Romanian Jewish heritage, who assisted Israel during the 1948 Arab–Israeli War and later became the country's first general. It is located adjacent to the ruins of the depopulated Arab village of Khulda. During the 1970s the kibbutz absorbed several immigrants from the United Kingdom. Its economy was based on growing maize, avocados and grapes, as well as a printing press.

The communal lifestyle was diminishing by the 1990s; the kibbutz's dining hall closed in 1994, and in 1999 the system of being paid according to needs was abolished. In 2003, following a vote of 50 in favour and only one against, it was converted to a community settlement, the first kibbutz to do so. The kibbutz had debts of £18 million, and would sell a chunk of land to build 350 new homes, whilst the rest of the land was returned to the state. Each kibbutz member was given shares in the printing press business.

During an archeological salvage excavation in 2006, prior to the commencement of building, the Israel Antiquities Authority announced that they had discovered an ancient Umayyad settlement covering six dunams in Mishmar David. The discovery included a never-seen-before round building dated to the Byzantine-Islamic period, with a diameter of around 10 metres and a polychrome mosaic floor covered with geometric patterns and a palm tree motif.
