= Mishmar HaShiv'a =

Moshav in central Israel

Mishmar HaShiva: משמר השבעה (Hebrew)
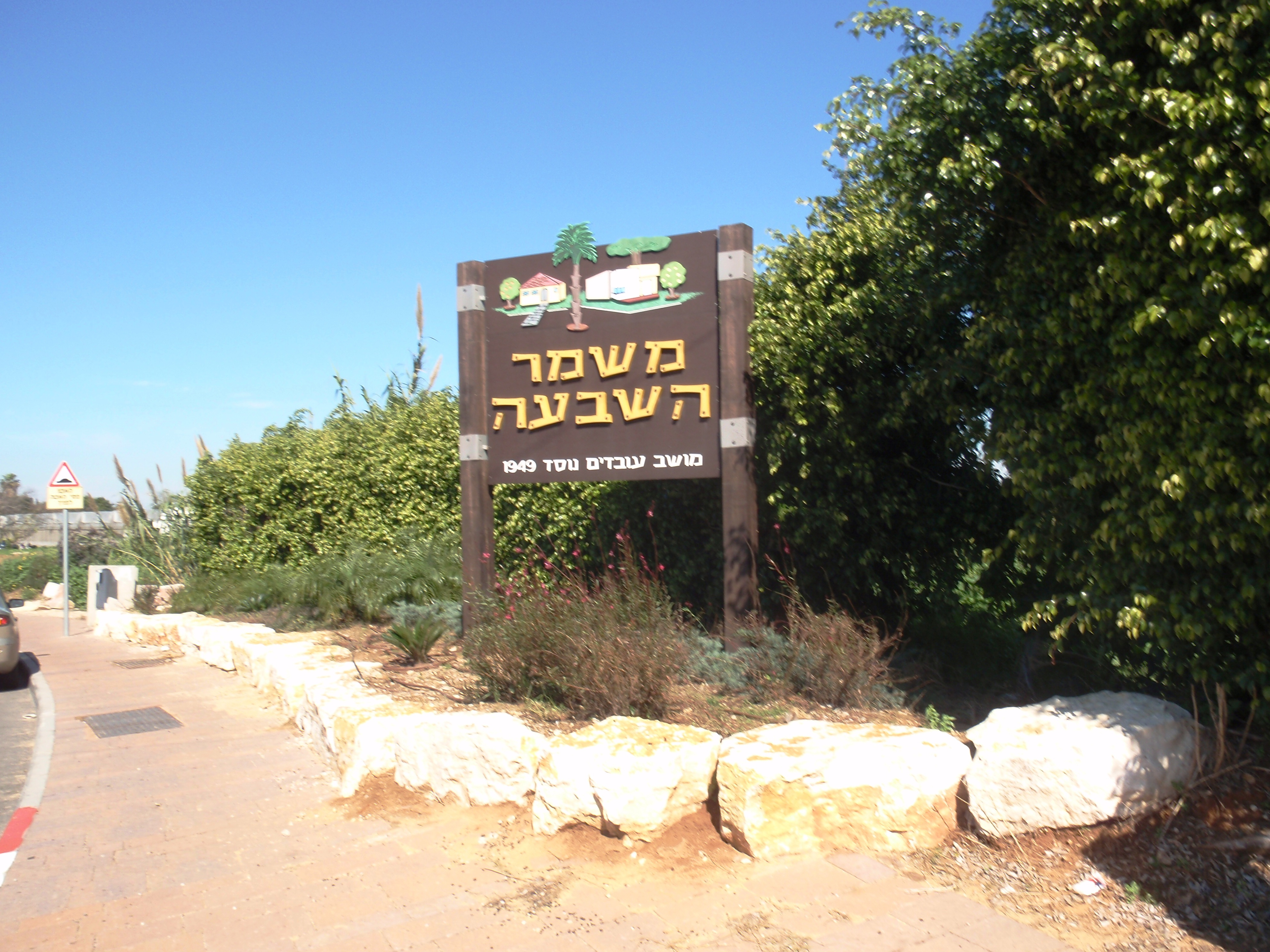

- Location within Central Israel
- Coordinates: 32°0′34″N 34°49′25″E
- Country: Israel
- District: Central
- Subdistrict: Ramla
- Council: Sdot Dan
- Founded: 1949
- Founder: Demobilised soldiers
- Population (2024): 1,069

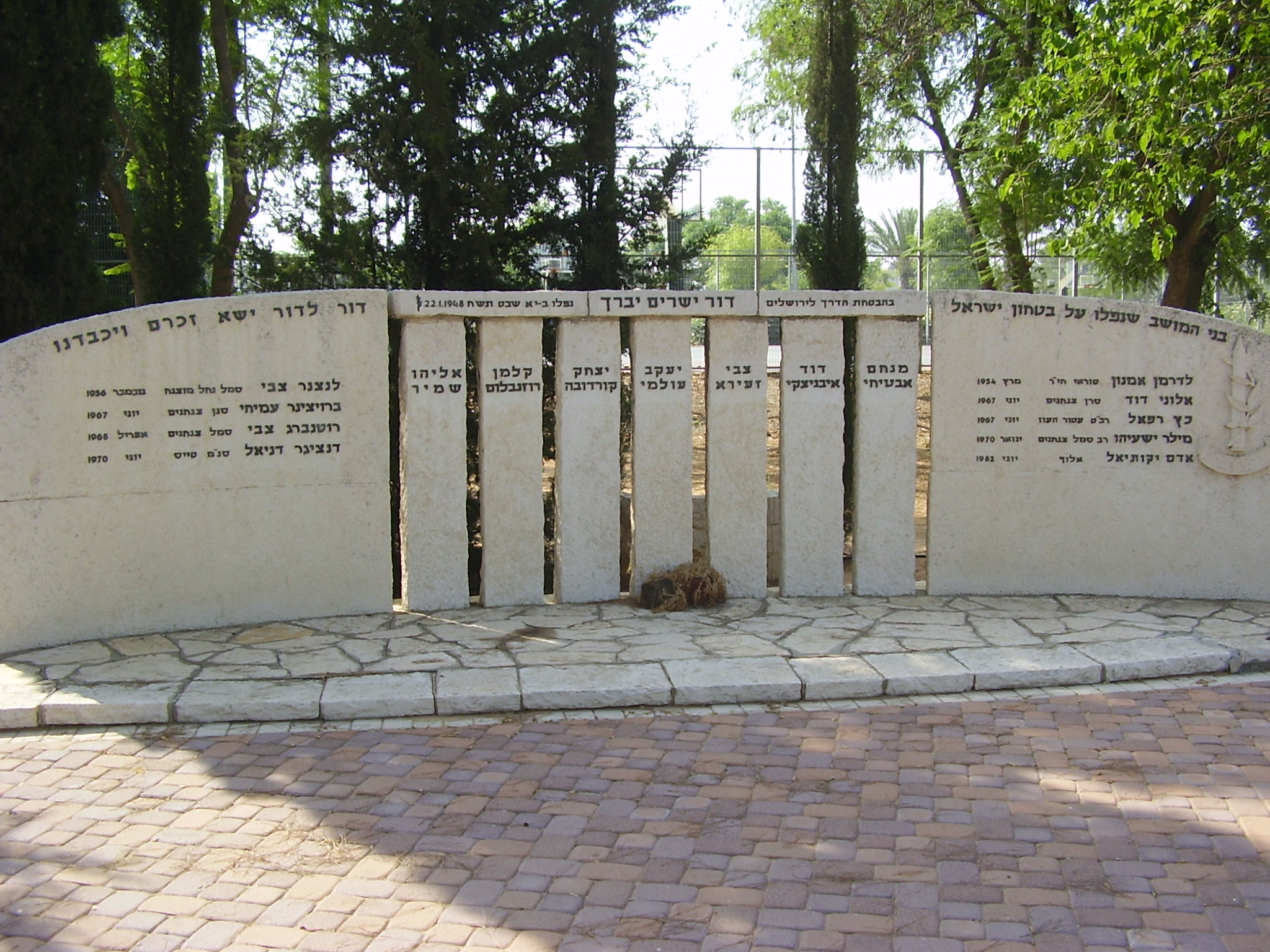
A memorial to the seven guards

Mishmar HaShiv'a (Hebrew: משמר השבעה, lit. 'Guard of the Seven') is a moshav in the Central District of Israel. Located near Beit Dagan, it falls under the jurisdiction of Sdot Dan Regional Council. In 2024 it had a population of 1,069.

== History ==
The village was founded in 1949 by demobilised soldiers on land located near the Palestinian village of Bayt Dajan, which was depopulated in the 1948 Arab–Israeli War. It was named in memory of the seven Notrim who were killed near Yazur on 22 January 1948.
