= Karmei Yosef =

Community settlement in central Israel

Karmei Yosef: כַּרְמֵי יוֹסֵף (Hebrew)
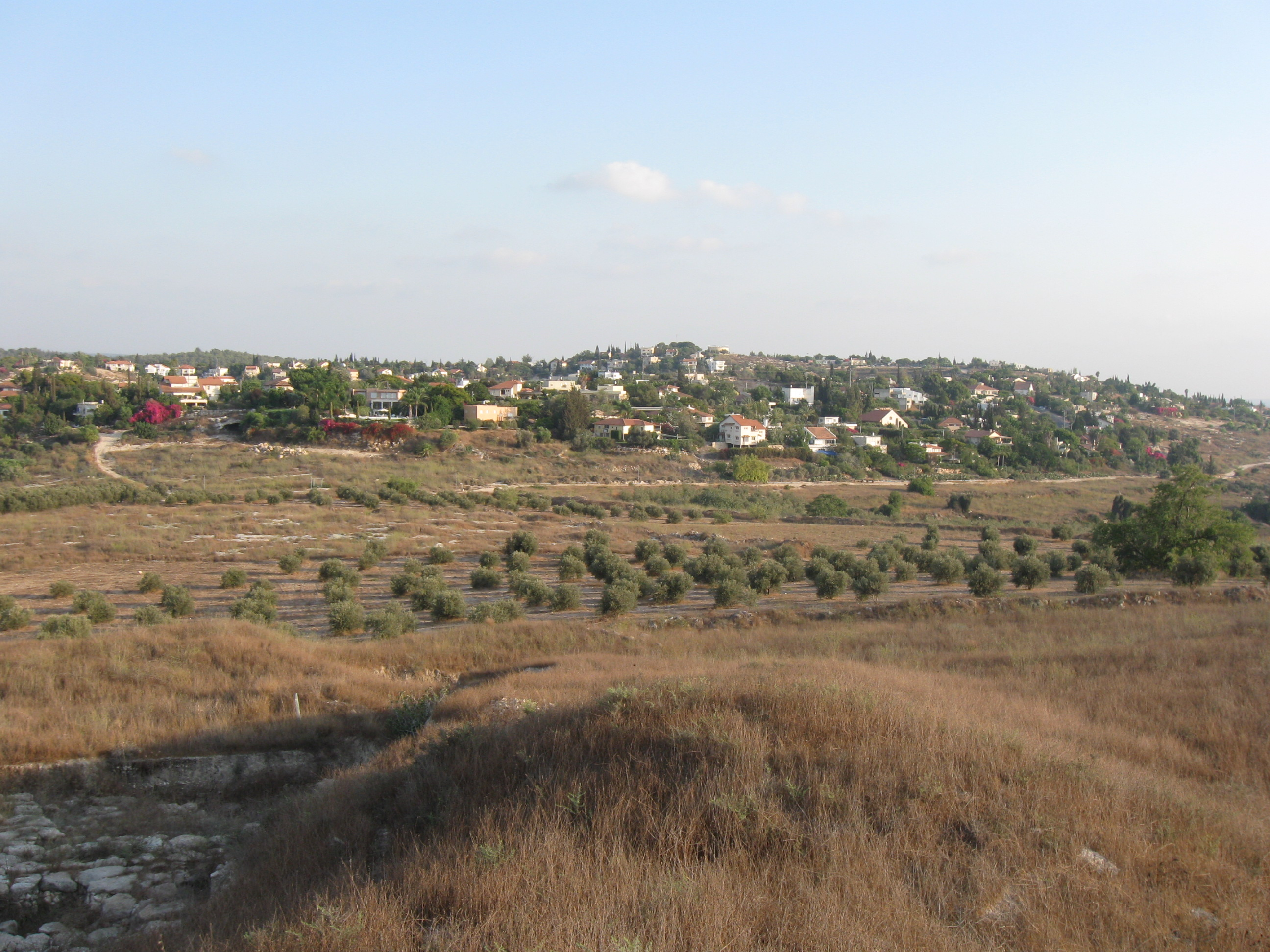
- Karmei Yosef from Tel Gezer
- Etymology: Yosef's Vineyards
- Location within Ashkelon region of Israel
- Coordinates: 31°50′54″N 34°55′13″E
- Country: Israel
- District: Central
- Subdistrict: Ramla
- Council: Gezer
- Founded: 1984
- Founder: Former residents of Ness Ziona and Rehovot
- Population (2024): 1,762
- Website: www.karmeyyosef.org

Karmei Yosef (Hebrew: כַּרְמֵי יוֹסֵף, lit. 'Yosef's Vineyards') is a community settlement in the Judean foothills in central Israel. Located in the Shephelah between Bet Shemesh and Rehovot, it falls under the jurisdiction of Gezer Regional Council. In 2024 it had a population of 1,762.

== History ==
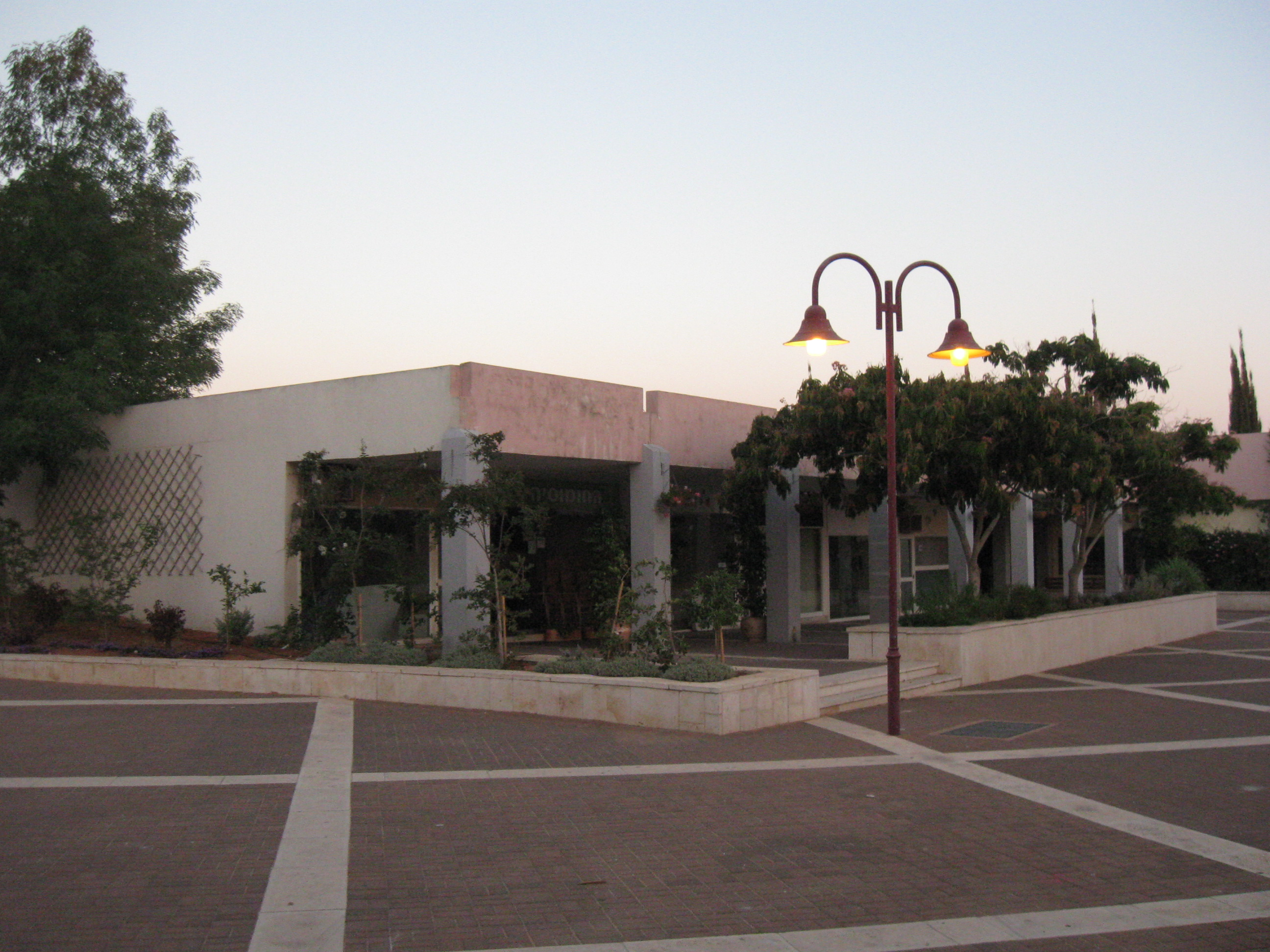
Karmei Yosef

Karmei Yosef was founded in 1984 by former residents of Ness Ziona and Rehovot, and was named after Yosef Sapir. Karmei Yosef is spread out over approx. 1640 dunams (approx. 410 acres) 200–260 meters above sea level, and borders the Ayalon Valley to the North and the Meginim Forest to the South. Karmei Yosef is situated in the midst of agricultural lands, mostly vineyards growing grapes for wine and eating, as well as fruit and olive groves, covering some 7500 dunams (roughly 1875 acres).

Karmei Yosef is located near the ancient city of Gezer.

In July 2022 one person died when a sink hole opened up below a swimming pool.

== Notable residents ==
- Ida Nudel (born 1931), refusenik and activist
- Amos Yadlin
