= Mishmar Ayalon =

Moshav in central Israel

Mishmar Ayalon: מִשְׁמַר אַיָּלוֹן (Hebrew)
- Location within Central Israel Location within Israel
- Coordinates: 31°52′28″N 34°56′46″E
- Country: Israel
- District: Central
- Subdistrict: Ramla
- Council: Gezer
- Affiliation: Moshavim Movement
- Founded: 1949
- Founder: Czechoslovak Jewish immigrants
- Population (2024): 573

Mishmar Ayalon (Hebrew: מִשְׁמַר אַיָּלוֹן, lit. 'Ayalon Guard') is a moshav in central Israel. Located between Latrun and Ramla on the old Jerusalem-Tel Aviv road, it falls under the jurisdiction of Gezer Regional Council. In 2024 it had a population of 573.

== Etymology ==
The moshav overlooks the Biblical valley of Ayalon (Joshua 10:12), after which it is named.

== History ==
The moshav was founded in 1949 by a gar'in of Jewish Holocaust survivors from Czechoslovakia, on land located near the depopulated Palestinian Arab village of Al-Qubab.

The Lehi forest is located in the moshav. In 2005 a monument to Lehi fighters (the Stern Gang) was erected in the village.

The moshav's main industry is agriculture, particularly focusing on fruit, vegetables and dairy farming known for their high quality cheese.
