= Petahya =

Moshav in central Israel

Petahya: פְּתַחְיָה (Hebrew)
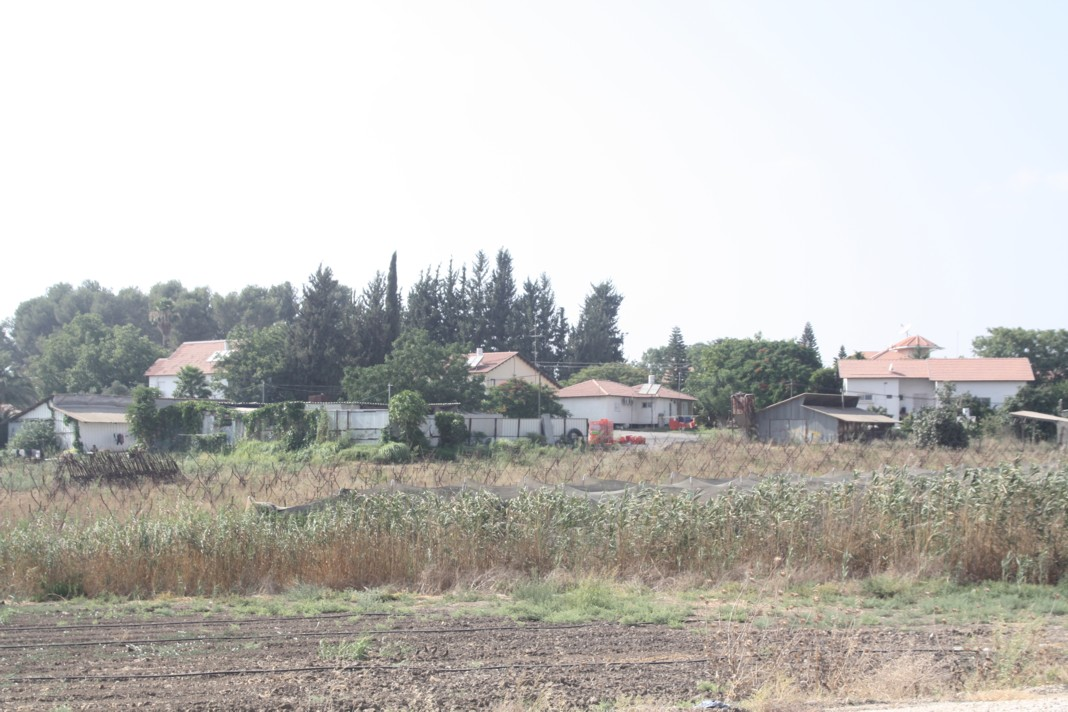

- Location within Central Israel
- Coordinates: 31°52′3″N 34°53′14″E
- Country: Israel
- District: Central
- Subdistrict: Ramla
- Council: Gezer
- Affiliation: HaOved HaTzioni
- Founded: 1951
- Founder: Tunisian immigrants
- Population (2024): 959

Petahya (Hebrew: פְּתַחְיָה) is a moshav in central Israel. Located in the Shephelah near Mazkeret Batya, it falls under the jurisdiction of Gezer Regional Council. In 2024 it had a population of 959.

== History ==
The village was established in 1951 by immigrants from the Tunisian youth movement HaNoar HaTzioni. They were later joined by immigrants from Algeria and India. It was initially named Gezer 10, but later renamed Petahya, a word derived from "a personal name in [the] Bible .. (I Chron. 24:16)".

Today, the main agricultural activity is vineyard cultivation.
