= Gezer Regional Council =

Israeli regional council

Coordinates: 31°52′N 34°55′E

Gezer גזר
- Regional council (from 1949)
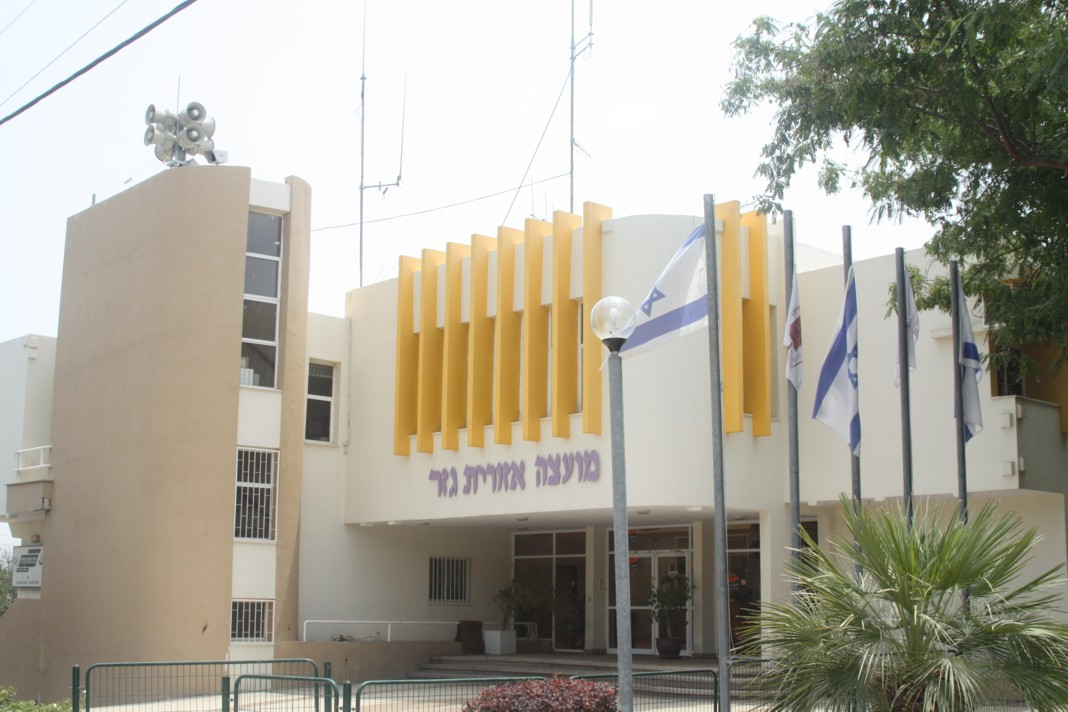
- Gezer Regional Council Headquarters

- Interactive map of Gezer
- Country: Israel
- District: Central
- Subdistrict: Ramla, Rehovot
- Natural region: Modi'in, Ramla, Rehovot

Government
  - Head of Municipality: Rotem Yadlin

Area
  - Total: 114,230 dunams (114.23 km^{2}; 44.10 sq mi)

Population (2024)
  - Total: 29,372
  - Density: 257.13/km^{2} (665.96/sq mi)
- Website: Official website

Gezer Regional Council (Hebrew: מועצה אזורית גזר, romanized: Mo'atza Azorit Gezer) is a regional council in the Shephelah region of the Central District of Israel. The council's headquarters are located in the community settlement of Beit Hashmonai. Established in 1949, the regional council had a population of 29,372 in 2024.

== List of settlements ==
The council covers five kibbutzim, 15 moshavim, and five community settlements.

Kibbutzim

- Gezer
- Hulda
- Na'an
- Netzer Sereni
- Sha'alvim

Moshavim

- Azaria
- Beit Uziel
- Ganei Yohanan
- Kfar Ben Nun
- Kfar Bilu
- Kfar Shmuel
- Matzliah
- Mishmar Ayalon
- Pedaya
- Petahya
- Ramot Meir
- Sitria
- Yad Rambam
- Yashresh
- Yatzitz

Community settlements

- Beit Hashmonai
- Ganei Hadar
- Karmei Yosef
- Mishmar David
- Nof Ayalon

== Demographics ==
Historical population
Year	Pop.	±%
1972	6,700	—
1983	7,500	+11.9%
1995	12,700	+69.3%
2008	20,700	+63.0%
2022	28,535	+37.9%
2024	29,372	+2.9%

== Voting Patterns ==
In the 2022 election, 53 percent of voters in the regional council voted for the parties of the center-left coalition led by Yair Lapid, while 46 percent voted for the parties of the right-wing coalition led by Benjamin Netanyahu and 0.2 percent voted for the Arab parties.

In the 2026 election, 54 percent of voters in the regional council voted for the parties of the center-left coalition led by Gadi Eisenkot, while 39 percent voted for the parties of the right-wing coalition led by Benjamin Netanyahu and 0.2 percent voted for the Arab parties. An additional 3.4 percent voted for the Reservists, and 2.4 percent voted for Amcha Yisrael. Voter turnout increased 10 percent from the 2022 election.

== Twin cities ==
- Leawood, Kansas, United States
- Grimma, Germany
