= Beit Uziel =

Moshav in central Israel

Beit Uziel: בֵּית עוּזִיאֵל (Hebrew)

Hebrew transcription(s)
  - Standard: Beit Uzi'el
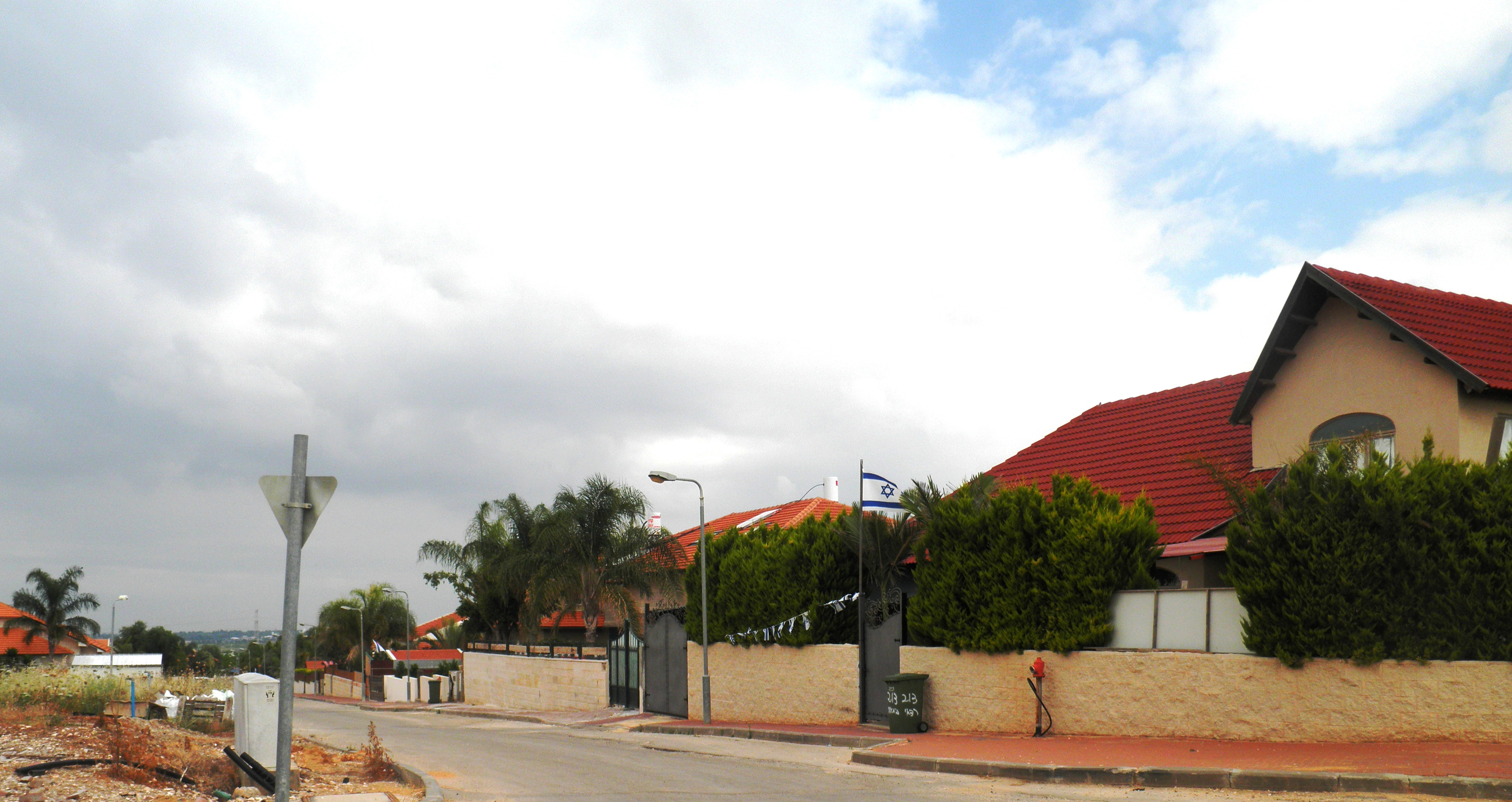
- Etymology: House of Uziel
- Location within Central Israel Location within Israel
- Coordinates: 31°52′11″N 34°54′15″E
- Country: Israel
- District: Central
- Subdistrict: Ramla
- Council: Gezer
- Affiliation: Hapoel HaMizrachi
- Founded: 1956
- Founder: Moroccan and Indian Jews
- Population (2024): 670
- Website: www.bet-uziel.org

Beit Uziel (Hebrew: בֵּית עוּזִיאֵל) is a religious moshav in Israel. Located near Rehovot, it falls under the jurisdiction of Gezer Regional Council. In 2024 it had a population of 670.

== History ==
The village was founded in 1956 by Jews who had emigrated from Morocco and from India. Agricultural pursuits include vineyards, poultry farming chicken coops, and greenhouses.
