= Ramla Subdistrict =

Coordinates: 31°56′0.3″N 34°52′16.7″E

Ramla Subdistrict נפת רמלה قضاء الرملة
- Subdistrict
- Central District in blue, with Ramla Subdistrict in dark blue
- Interactive map of Ramla Subdistrict
- Country: Israel
- District: Central

Area
  - Total: 339 km^{2} (131 sq mi)

Population (2024)
  - Total: 405,884

Ethnicity
  - Jews and others: 85.6%
  - Arabs: 12.0%

The Ramla Subdistrict is one of Israel's subdistricts in the Central District. There are three principal cities in the subdistrict: Ramla, Lod, and Modi'in-Maccabim-Re'ut.

== History ==
The subdistrict is composed mostly of the eastern half of what was during Mandatory Palestine the Ramle Subdistrict.

== Demographics ==
Historical population
Year	Pop.	±%
1972	87,300	—
1983	106,600	+22.1%
1995	148,500	+39.3%
2008	280,320	+88.8%
2022	377,005	+34.5%
2024	405,884	+7.7%

== Administrative local authorities ==
Cities	Local Councils	Regional Councils
Be'er Ya'akov; Lod; Modi'in-Maccabim-Re'ut; Ramla	Beit Dagan; Shoham	Gezer (part); Hevel Modi'in (part); Sdot Dan

== Voting Patterns ==
In the 2022 election, 53 percent of voters in the subdistrict voted for the parties of the right-wing coalition led by Benjamin Netanyahu, while 40 percent voted for the parties of the center-left coalition led by Yair Lapid, and 7 percent voted for the Arab parties.

In the 2026 election, 45 percent of voters in the subdistrict voted for the parties of the right-wing coalition led by Benjamin Netanyahu, while 39 percent voted for the parties of the center-left coalition led by Gadi Eisenkot and 9 percent voted for the Arab parties. An additional 3.7 percent voted for the Reservists, and 2.5 percent voted for Amcha Yisrael. Voter turnout increased 22 percent from the 2022 election.

== Natural Regions ==
Districts, Subdistricts and Natural Regions of the State of Israel, 2018

- 431 Modi'in
  - Population (2024): 109,131
  - Largest city: Modi'in-Maccabim-Re'ut
- 432 Ramla
  - Population (2024): 296,753
  - Largest city: Lod
