= Judea =

Region in the Levant

Judea יְהוּדָה (Hebrew)
- Region
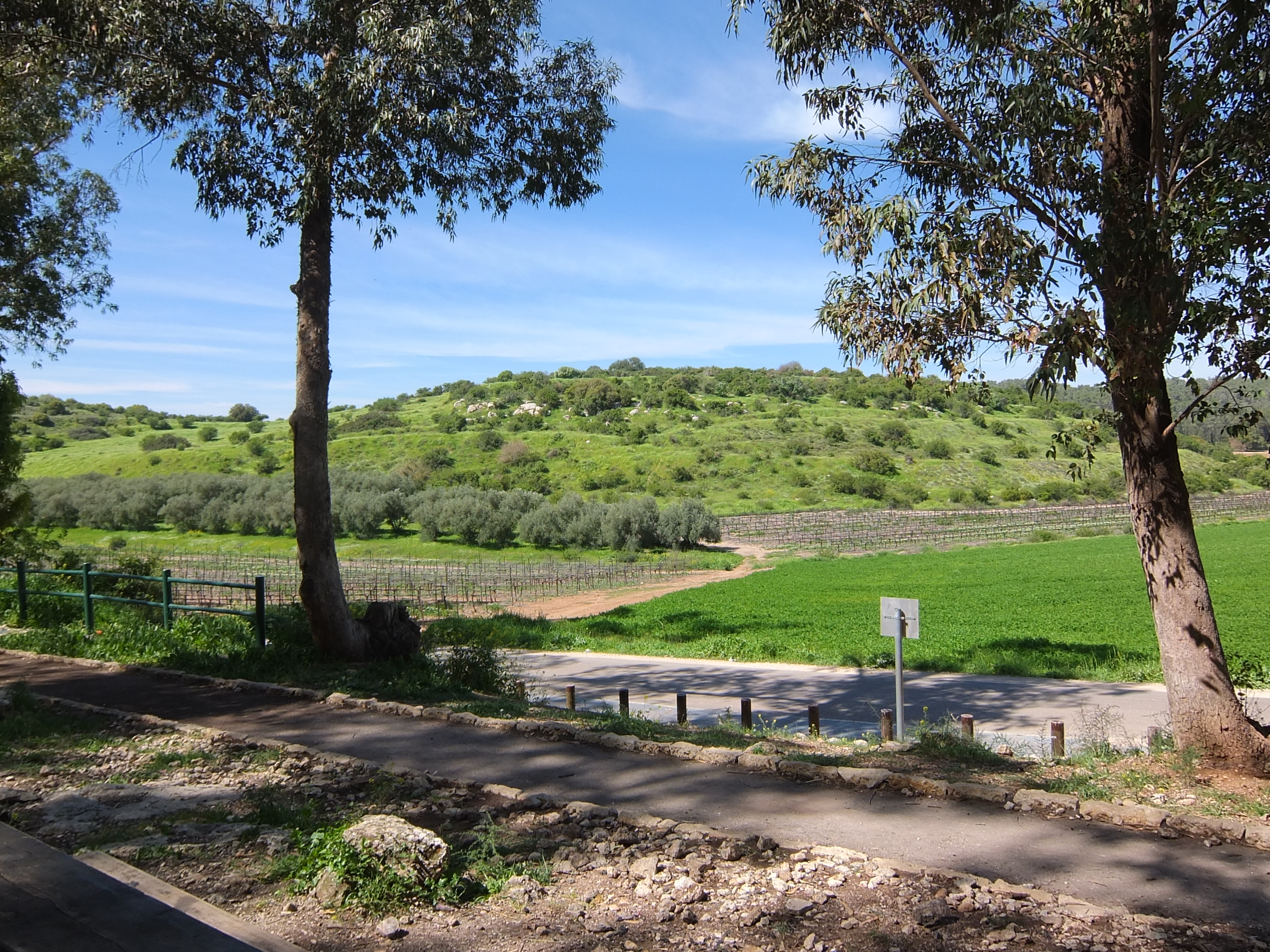
- Interactive map of Judea
- Coordinates: 31°40′N 35°00′E
- Location: Southern Levant
- Part of: Palestine; Israel
- Highest elevation: 1,020 m or 3,350 ft (Mount Hebron)

Judea or Judaea (/dʒuːˈdiːə, dʒuːˈdeɪə/; Hebrew: יהודה, Modern: Yəhūda, Tiberian: Yehūḏā; Arabic: يهودا, Yahūdā; Greek: Ἰουδαία, Ioudaía; Latin: Iudaea) is a mountainous region of the Levant. Traditionally dominated by the city of Jerusalem, it is now part of Israel and the West Bank. The name is derived from the Hebrew name Yehudah, and was used during the Babylonian, Persian, Hellenistic, and Roman periods. Under the Hasmoneans, the Herodians, and the Romans, the term was applied to an area larger than the Judea of earlier periods. In the aftermath of the Bar Kokhba revolt (c. 132–136 CE), the Roman province of Judaea was renamed Syria Palaestina.

The term Judea was used by English speakers for the hilly internal part of Mandatory Palestine. Judea roughly corresponds to the southern part of the West Bank (Arabic: الضِفَّة الغَرْبِيَّة, romanized: aḍ-ḍiffa al-gharbiya), a territory Israel has occupied since 1967 and administered as the "Judea and Samaria Area" (מחוז יהודה ושומרון, Makhoz Yehuda VeShomron). Usage of the term "Judea and Samaria" is associated with the right wing in Israeli politics.

== Etymology ==
The name Judea is a Greek and Roman adaptation of the Hebrew name Yehudah (Hebrew יהודה), one of the Twelve Tribes of Israel and later used as the name for the ancient Kingdom of Judah. Nimrud Tablet K.3751, dated c. 733 BCE, is the earliest known extra-biblical record of the name Judah (written in Assyrian cuneiform as Yaudaya or KUR.ia-ú-da-a-a). Related nomenclature continued to be used under the rule of the Babylonians (the Yehud province), the Persians (the Yehud province), during the Hellenistic period (Hasmonean Judea), and under the Romans (Provincia Iudaea, or Province of Judaea).

=== Origins ===
There is no consensus among linguists and historians as to the origins of the name Judah (Yehudah). The Book of Genesis presents a folk etymology deriving it from a legendary founder Judah, the son of Jacob, offering a wordplay This etymology is generally regarded as dubious by modern scholars because of its strong similarity to other eponymic legends from antiquity that were later proven to be false, and because Judah does not appear as a given name until late in the post-Exilic period. Several scholars have suggested Judah may be a theophoric name referencing the tetragrammaton (y-h-w), a shortening of Yehuda-el ("praise be to El"), or an otherwise-unattested god y-h-w-d. However, there is little to no agreement on the specifics of such an origin, and these theories have fallen out of favor. A more likely explanation suggests Yehuda is cognate with the Arabic wahda ("ravine" or "gorge"), though such a term is not directly attested in the Old Testament.

=== History ===
Judea was sometimes used as the name for the entire region, including parts beyond the river Jordan. In 200 CE Sextus Julius Africanus, cited by Eusebius (Church History 1.7.14), described "Nazara" (Nazareth) as a village in Judea. The King James Version of the Bible refers to the region as "Jewry". 'Judean' was not exclusively used as ethnic identifier; Ptolemy of Ascalon, for example, quoted in a work by Ammonius of Alexandria, distinguishes between Judeans originating within the land of Judea, "and forcefully circumcised Idumeans (of Syrian or Phoenician origin, in his view) who could likewise be designated 'Judeans.'"

=== Extent ===
Under the Hasmoneans, the Herodians, and the Romans, the term was applied to an area larger than the Judea of earlier periods. In the aftermath of the Bar Kokhba revolt (c. 132–136 CE), the Roman province of Judaea was renamed Syria Palaestina.

'Judea' was a name used by English speakers for the hilly internal part of Mandatory Palestine until the Jordanian rule of the area in 1948. For example, the borders of the two states to be established according to the UN's 1947 partition scheme were officially described using the terms 'Judea' and 'Samaria' and in its reports to the League of Nations Mandatory Committee, as in 1937, the geographical terms employed were 'Samaria and Judea.' Jordan called the area aḍ-ḍiffa al-gharbiya (الضِفَّة الغَرْبِيَّة translated into English as 'the West Bank'). 'Yehuda' (יהודה) is the Hebrew term used for the area in modern Israel since the region was captured and occupied by Israel in the 1967 Six Day War. According to Britannica, referring to this region as 'Judea and Samaria' (יהודה ושומרון, Yehuda VeShomron) has been associated with the right wing in Israeli politics, which does not support a two state solution to the Israeli–Palestinian conflict. The term 'West Bank' is what appears on international treaties such as the Oslo Accords established between the Palestine Liberation Organization and the Israeli government. The names "West Bank" (הַגָּדָה הַמַּעֲרָבִית, HaGadah HaMaʽaravit) or, alternatively, "the Territories" (השטחים, HaShtahim) are also current in Israeli usage. Generally, preference for one term over the other indicates the speaker's position on the Israeli political spectrum.

== Historical boundaries ==
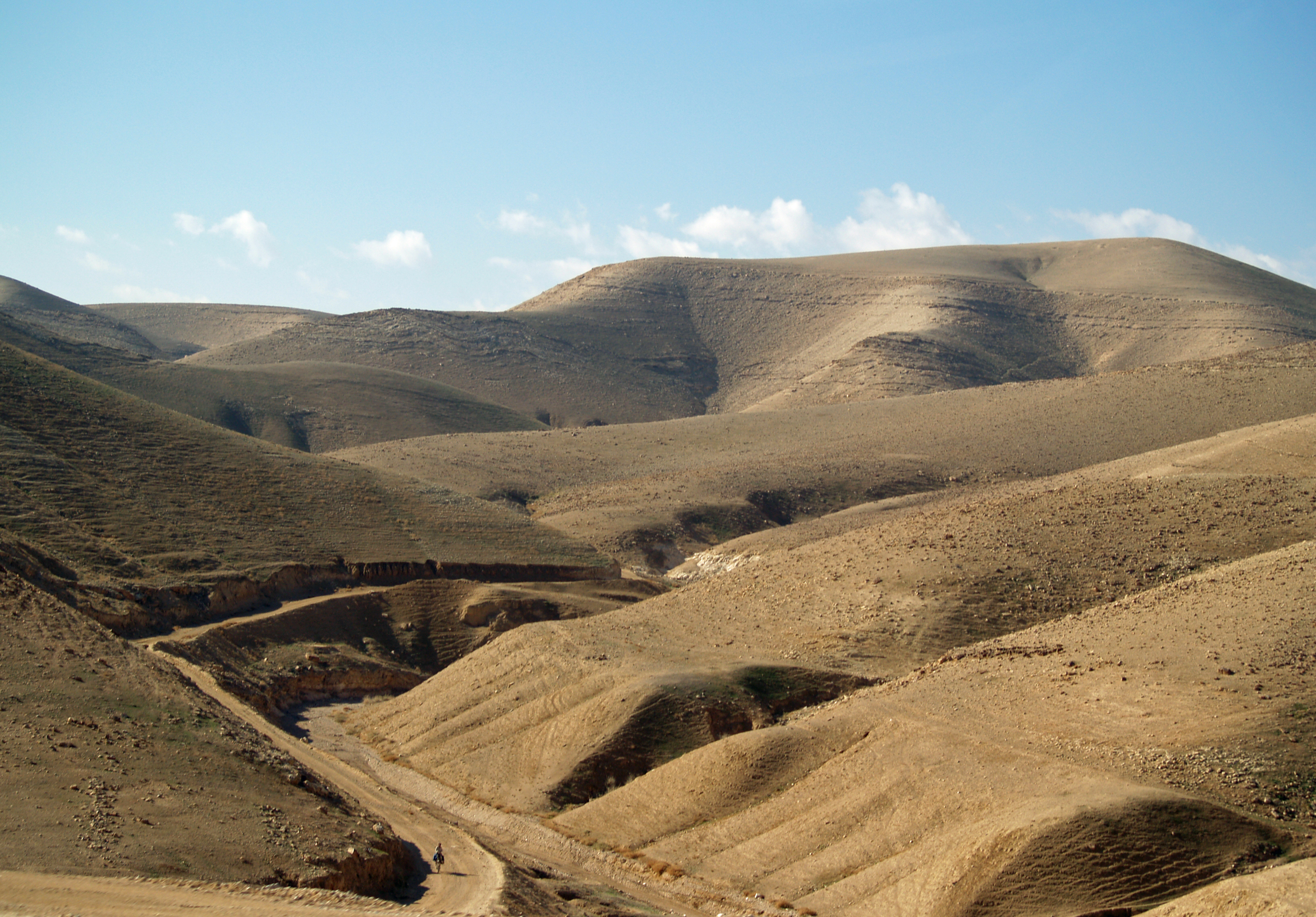
The Judean hills

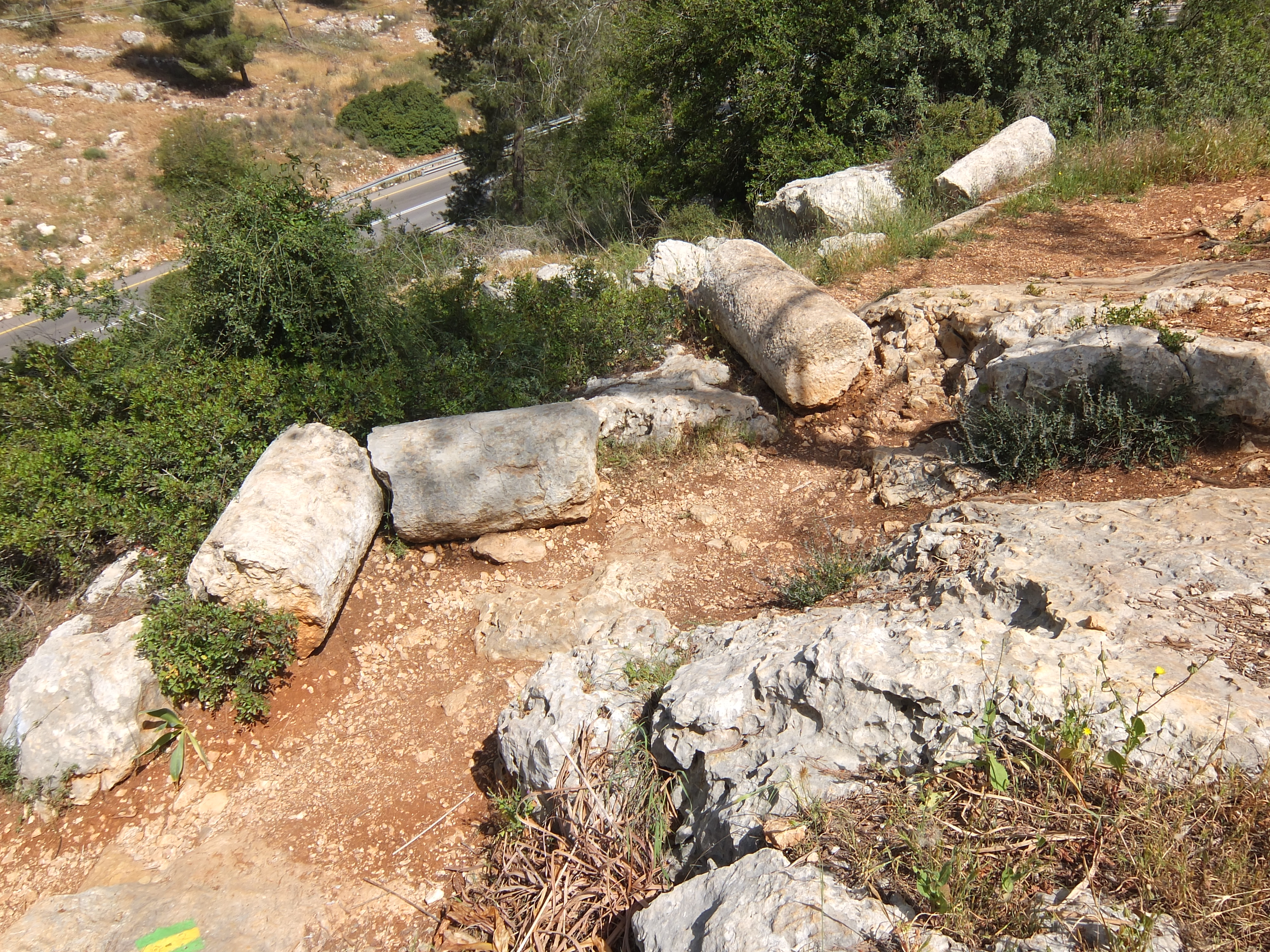
Old Roman road in Judea

=== Roman-era definition ===
The first century Roman-Jewish historian Josephus wrote (The Jewish War 3.3.5):

In the limits of Samaria and Judea lies the village Anuath, which is also named Borceos. This is the northern boundary of Judea. The southern parts of Judea, if they be measured lengthways, are bounded by a village adjoining to the confines of Arabia; the Jews that dwell there call it Jordan. However, its breadth is extended from the river Jordan to Joppa. The city Jerusalem is situated in the very middle; on which account some have, with sagacity enough, called that city the Navel of the country. Nor indeed is Judea destitute of such delights as come from the sea, since its maritime places extend as far as Ptolemais: it was parted into eleven portions, of which the royal city Jerusalem was the supreme, and presided over all the neighboring country, as the head does over the body. As to the other cities that were inferior to it, they presided over their several toparchies; Gophna was the second of those cities, and next to that Acrabatta, after them Thamna, and Lydda, and Emmaus, and Pella, and Idumea, and Engaddi, and Herodium, and Jericho; and after them came Jamnia and Joppa, as presiding over the neighboring people; and besides these there was the region of Gamala, and Gaulonitis, and Batanea, and Trachonitis, which are also parts of the kingdom of Agrippa. This [last] country begins at Mount Libanus, and the fountains of Jordan, and reaches breadthways to Lake Tiberias; and in length is extended from a village called Arpha, as far as Julias. Its inhabitants are a mixture of Jews and Syrians. And thus have I, with all possible brevity, described the country of Judea, and those that lie round about it.

Elsewhere, Josephus wrote that "Arabia is a country that borders on Judea."

The first century Roman historian Tacitus defined Judaea as bordered by Arabia to the east, Egypt to the south, Phoenicia and the Mediterranean Sea to the west, and Syria to the north. His conception, presented in Histories 5.6, mirrors a conventional understanding of Judaea as the territory where Jews predominated from the Hasmonaean era onward, standing apart from the provincial borders of the province of Judaea in his own period.

== Geography ==
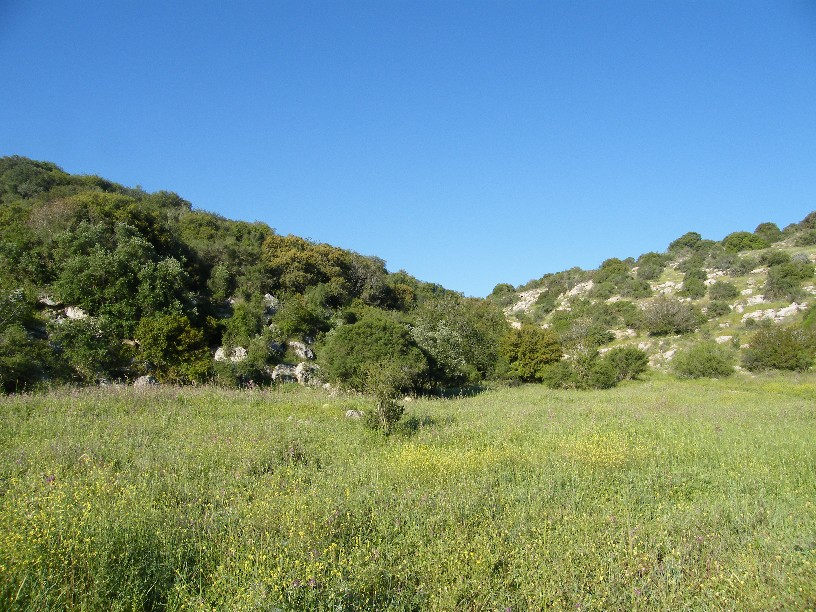
Mediterranean oak and terebinth woodland in the Valley of Elah, southwestern Judea

Judea is a mountainous region, part of which is considered a desert. It varies greatly in height, rising to an altitude of 1,020 metres (3,350 ft) in the south at the Hebron Hills, 30 km (19 mi) southwest of Jerusalem, and descending to as much as 400 metres (1,300 ft) below sea level in the east of the region. It also varies in rainfall, starting with about 400–500 millimetres (16–20 in) in the western hills, rising to 600 millimetres (24 in) around western Jerusalem (in central Judea), falling back to 400 millimetres (16 in) in eastern Jerusalem and dropping to around 100 millimetres (3.9 in) in the eastern parts, due to a rain shadow: this is the Judaean Desert. The climate, accordingly, moves between Mediterranean in the west and desert climate in the east, with a strip of semi-arid climate in the middle. Major urban areas in the region include Jerusalem, Bethlehem, Gush Etzion, Jericho and Hebron.

Geographers divide Judea into several regions: the Hebron hills, the Jerusalem saddle, the Bethel hills and the Judaean Desert east of Jerusalem, which descends in a series of steps to the Dead Sea. The hills are distinct for their anticline structure. In ancient times the hills were forested, and the Bible records agriculture and sheep farming being practiced in the area. Animals are still grazed today, with shepherds moving them between the low ground to the hilltops as summer approaches, while the slopes are still layered with centuries-old stone terracing. The Jewish Revolt against the Romans ended in the devastation of vast areas of the Judean countryside.

The rough and hilly landscape of the Judean mountains heavily shaped how people traveled in ancient times, forcing historical roads to follow natural paths like mountain ridges and river valleys. The main north-south route ran directly along the top of the central mountain ridge, while side roads branched out through major valleys like Soreq and Refa'im to connect the highlands with the Shephelah and the coast. In the north, the gentler terrain of the Benjamin Hills allowed for important routes like the Beth Horon ascent. In contrast, the eastern border features a sharp drop along Mount Scopus and the Mount of Olives into the dry Judean Desert. Along this steep slope, ancient fortresses and settlements guarded the narrow mountain passes that connected Jerusalem to the Jericho oasis and the Dead Sea basin.

== History ==
=== Biblical era ===
Map of the southern Levant, c. 830s BCE Kingdom of Judah

According to the biblical story of the Patriarchs, Abraham came to the Land of Canaan as commanded by God and moved around in the hill country (Judaea and Samaria) and the Negev. The country is described as populated by Canaanites, Hittites, Jebusites and other population groups. This pattern continued with his son Isaac, his son Jacob and his 12 sons and daughter, Dinah and their families. The Patriarchs Sarai, Abraham, Isaac, Rebecca and Jacob were buried at Hebron in the Tomb of the Patriarchs according to Genesis and Exodus.

After the Conquest of Joshua the Israelite tribes conquered and lived in most of the land west of the river Jordan and in the northern part east of that river for close to 400 years.

The biblical account in the Books of Kings describes how King Saul and later King David and his son Solomon (Shlomo) succeeded in fighting the last remnants of non-Israelite populations and unified the tribes into one united monarchy. According to our understanding of the text as well as recent archeological findings, this was to a large degree possible through the Israelite adaption of Iron Age technologies. Scholarship has been divided as to the historical veracity of the existence and extension of a kingdom that unified Judea and Samaria, but archeological excavations of the last 30 years have time and again found solid evidence that confirms the bibilcal descriptions.

Regardless, the Northern Kingdom was conquered by the Neo-Assyrian Empire in 720 BCE and parts of the population of the 10 northern tribes exiled. The northern Kingdom of Judah remained nominally independent, but paid tribute to the Assyrian Empire from 715 and throughout the first half of the 7th century BCE, regaining its independence as the Assyrian Empire declined after 640 BCE, but after 609 again fell under the sway of imperial rule, this time paying tribute at first to the Egyptians and after 601 BCE to the Neo-Babylonian Empire, until 586 BCE, when it was finally conquered by Babylonia, the temple in Jerusalem destroyed and many of the inhabitants of Judea exiled to Babylonia.

=== Persian and Hellenistic periods ===
Hasmonean Kingdom at its greatest extent under Salome Alexandra

The Babylonian Empire fell to the conquests of Cyrus the Great in 539 BCE. Judea remained under Persian rule until the conquest of Alexander the Great in 332 BCE, eventually falling under the rule of the Hellenistic Seleucid Empire until the revolt of Judas Maccabeus resulted in the Hasmonean dynasty of kings who ruled in Judea for over a century.

Throughout these eras, Jerusalem served as the region's main urban and religious center. Under Persian and Early Hellenistic rule, it functioned as a modest provincial capital with a sparsely populated countryside that imported pottery and goods from across the Mediterranean. With the rise of the Hasmonean dynasty, the city underwent massive growth. To support the expanding capital and the Temple, the state heavily developed the surrounding countryside, nearly doubling the number of local farming villages. These farms were managed by a centralized taxation system based in the city and were equipped with ritual baths to ensure that the wine and olive oil produced for the capital met strict Jewish purity laws.

=== Early Roman period ===
Judea lost its independence to the Romans in the 1st century BCE, becoming first a tributary kingdom, then a province, of the Roman Empire. The Romans had allied themselves to the Maccabees and interfered in 63 BCE, at the end of the Third Mithridatic War, when the proconsul Pompey ("Pompey the Great") stayed behind to make the area secure for Rome, including his siege of Jerusalem in 63 BCE. Queen Salome Alexandra had recently died, and a civil war broke out between her sons, Hyrcanus II and Aristobulus II. Pompeius restored Hyrcanus, but political rule soon passed to the Herodian dynasty, who ruled as client kings.

In 6 CE, Judea came under direct Roman rule as the southern part of the province of Judaea, although Jews living there still maintained some form of independence and could judge offenders by their own laws, including capital offences, until c. 28 CE. The Hashmonean kingdom, after Pompey's conquest, was divided in 57 BCE by Gabinius, the governor of Syria, into five administrative districts (synedria or toparchies), as mentioned by Josephus, later on the region of historical Judaea proper being further divided; the exact number of Judaean districts (in the end ten or eleven according to Josephus and Pliny) and their location is disputed, Schürer amending the ancient authors' list as follows: Jerusalem in the centre, later becoming the district of Orine ("Orine Judaea", 'mountainous [region of] Judaea'); Gophna, Akrabatta north of it; Thamna and Lydda to the northwest; Emmaus (possibly future Nicopolis/Imwas, although other towns in the region also bore that name) to the west; Bethleptepha (rather than Josephus' Pella) to the southwest; Idumaea to the south; Engaddi and Herodeion to the southeast; and Jericho to the east. Schürer dismisses Pliny's listing of "Jopica" (Joppa) and Josephus' of Pella, as these were, in his opinion, independent cities not included in Judaea proper.

Other regions outside Judaea proper, which had belonged to the Hasmonean and Herodian kingdoms and came under Roman dominance and then direct rule, remained or became also split into districts with regional capitals, these being Galilee (with the capital at Sepphoris and later Tiberias), and Perea in Transjordan (with Amathus); however, a district administered from a certain Gadara is also mentioned, which can be in three different locations - either in Perea (at or near Al-Salt), in the Decapolis at Umm Qais, or - which is relevant for Judaea - at biblical Gezer in the foothills of the Judaean Mountains, mentioned by Josephus under a Hellenised form of its Semitic name, Gadara, edited to "Gazara" in the Loeb edition).

=== Jewish–Roman wars and Late Roman period ===
==== First Jewish–Roman War ====
In 66 CE, the Jewish population rose against Roman rule in a revolt that was unsuccessful. Jerusalem was besieged in 70 CE. The city was razed, the Second Temple was destroyed, and much of the population was killed or enslaved.

==== Bar Kokhba revolt ====
In 132 CE, the Bar Kokhba revolt (132–136 CE) broke out. After an initial string of victories, rebel leader Simeon Bar Kokhba was able to form an independent Jewish state that lasted several years and included most of the district of Judea, including the Judean Mountains, the Judean Desert, and northern Negev desert, but probably not other sections of the country.

==== Aftermath ====
When the Romans finally put an end to the uprising, most of the Jews in Judea were killed or displaced, and a sizable number of captives were sold into slavery, leaving the district mostly depopulated. Jews were expelled from the area surrounding Jerusalem. No village in the district of Judea whose remains have been excavated so far has not been destroyed during the revolt. Roman emperor Hadrian, determined to root out Jewish nationalism, changed the name of the province from Judaea to Syria Palaestina. The province's Jewish population was now mainly concentrated in Galilee, the coastal plain (especially in Lydda, Joppa, and Caesarea), and smaller Jewish communities continued to live in the Beit She'an Valley, the Carmel, and Judea's northern and southern frontiers, including the southern Hebron Hills and along the shores of the Dead Sea.

The suppression of the Bar Kokhba revolt led to widespread destruction and displacement throughout Judea, and the district saw a decline in population. The Roman colony of Aelia Capitolina, which was built on the ruins of Jerusalem, remained a backwater for the duration of its existence. The villages around the city were depopulated, and arable lands in the region were confiscated by the Romans. Having no alternative population to fill the empty villages led the authorities to establish imperial or legionary estates and monasteries on confiscated village lands to benefit the elites and, later, the church. This also initiated a process of romanization that took place during the Late Roman period, with pagan populations penetrating the region and settling alongside Roman veterans. There was only a revival of village settlement on the eastern edges of Jerusalem's hinterland, on the transition between the arable highlands and the Judaean Desert. Those settlements grew on marginal lands with vague ownership and unenforced state land dominion.

=== Byzantine period ===
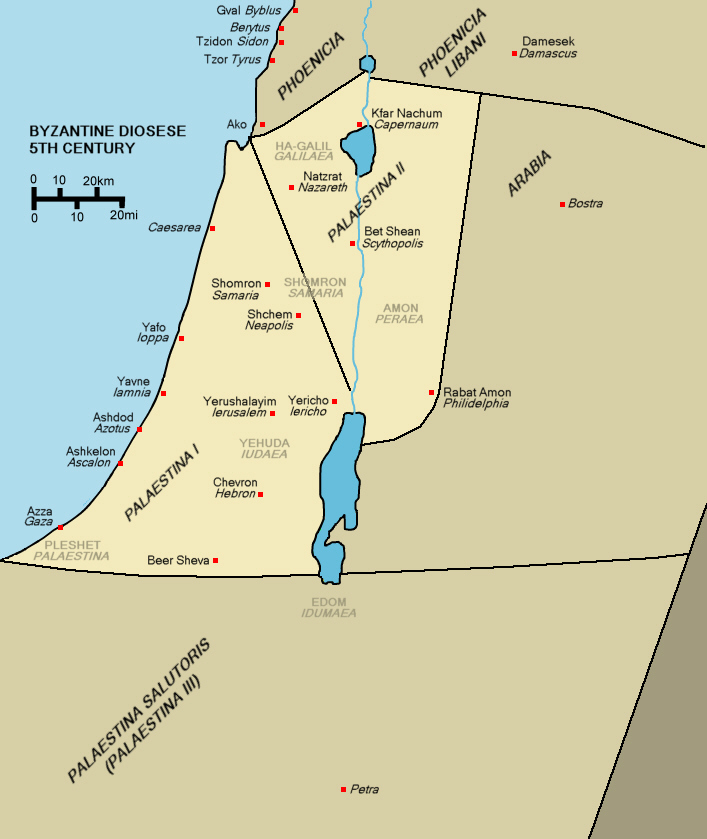
5th century CE: Byzantine provinces of Palaestina I (Philistia, Judea and Samaria) and Palaestina II (Galilee and Perea)

Judea's decline only came to an end in the fifth century CE, when it developed into a monastic center, and Jerusalem became a major Christian pilgrimage and ecclesiastical hub. Under Byzantine rule, the regional population, composed of pagan populations who had migrated there after Jews were driven out following the Bar Kokhba revolt, gradually converted to Christianity.

The Byzantines redrew the borders of the land of Palestine. The various Roman provinces (Syria Palaestina, Samaria, Galilee, and Peraea) were reorganized into three dioceses of Palaestina, reverting to the name first used by Greek historian Herodotus in the mid-5th century BCE: Palaestina Prima, Secunda, and Tertia or Salutaris (First, Second, and Third Palestine), part of the Diocese of the East. Palaestina Prima consisted of Judea, Samaria, the Paralia, and Peraea with the governor residing in Caesarea. Palaestina Secunda consisted of Galilee, the lower Jezreel Valley, the regions east of Galilee, and the western part of the former Decapolis with the seat of government at Scythopolis. Palaestina Tertia included the Negev, southern Jordan—once part of Arabia—and most of Sinai, with Petra as the usual residence of the governor. Palestina Tertia was also known as Palaestina Salutaris. According to historian H.H. Ben-Sasson, this reorganisation took place under Diocletian (284–305), although other scholars suggest this change occurred later, in 390.

=== Crusader period ===
The mostly French army of the First Crusade conquered Jerusalem from the Seljuks in 1099 and expanded the territory they held in the following years. According to Ellenblum, the Franks tended to settle in the southern half of the region between Jerusalem and Nablus since there was a sizable Christian population there.

=== Mamluk period ===
Most of the people living in the northern portion of Judea in the late 16th century were Muslims; some of them resided in towns that today have significant Christian populations. According to the 1596–1597 Ottoman census, Birzeit and Jifna, for instance, were wholly Muslim villages, while Taybeh had 63 Muslim families and 23 Christian families. There were 71 Christian families and 9 Muslim families in Ramallah, although the Christians there were recent arrivals who had moved from the Kerak area only a few years previously. According to Ehrlich, the region's Christian population decreased as a result of a combination of factors including impoverishment, oppression, marginalization, and persecution. Sufi activity took place in Jerusalem and the surrounding area, which most likely pushed Christian villagers in the region to convert to Islam.

== Timeline ==
- Around 1800-1500 BCE Period of Patriarchs. Stone Age.
- Around 1200 BCE Conquest of Joshua and period of Judges. Bronze Age.
- Around 900–586 BCE: Kingdom of Judah. Iron Age.
- 586–539 BCE: Yehud, Babylonian Empire
- 539–332 BCE: Yehud Medinata, Persian Empire
- 332–305 BCE: Macedonian Empire of Alexander the Great
- 305–198 BCE: Ptolemaic Egypt
- 198–141 BCE: Seleucid Empire
- 141–37 BCE: The Hasmonean kingdom established by the Maccabees, under the Roman Empire after 63 BCE
- 63 BCE: Pompey's conquest of Jerusalem
- 37 BCE – 132 CE: Herodian dynasty ruling Judea as a vassal state of the Roman Empire (37–4 BCE Herod the Great, 4 BCE – 6 CE Herod Archelaus, 41–44 CE Agrippa I), interchanging with direct Roman rule (6–41, 44–132)
- c. 25 BCE: Caesarea Maritima is built by Herod the Great, replacing Jerusalem as the capital
- 6 CE the Roman Empire deposed Herod Archelaus and converted his territory into the Roman province of Judea.
  - Census of Quirinius, too late to correspond to census related to Jesus' birth
- 26–36: Pontius Pilate prefect of Roman Judea during the Crucifixion of Jesus
- 41–44: The Romans temporarily restored Jewish royalty under Herod Agrippa. After his death, Judaea reverted to direct Roman rule, which now encompassed Judea, Samaria, Idumaea, Galilee, and Perea.
- 66–73: First Jewish–Roman War, includes Destruction of the Second Temple in 70
- 115–117: Kitos War
- 132–136: Bar Kokhba revolt
- c. 136: Judaea is renamed Syria Palaestina

== Selected towns and cities ==
Judea, in the generic sense, also incorporates places in Galilee and in Samaria.

Place Names of Judea
English	Hebrew (Masoretic, 7th–10th century CE)	Greek (Josephus, LXX, 3rd century BCE – 1st century CE)	Latin	Arabic
Jerusalem	ירושלם	Ιερουσαλήμ	Herusalem (Aelia Capitolina)	القدس (al-Quds)
Jericho	יריחו	Ίεριχω	Hiericho / Herichonte	أريحا (Ariḥa)
Shechem / Nablus	שכם	Νεάπολις (Neapolis)	Neapoli	نابلس (Nablus)
Jaffa	יפו	Ἰόππῃ	Ioppe	يَافَا (Yaffa)
Ascalon	אשקלון	Ἀσκάλων (Askálōn)	Ascalone	عَسْقَلَان (Asqalān)
Beit Shean	בית שאן	Σκυθόπολις (Scythopolis); Βαιθσάν (Beithsan)	Scytopoli	بيسان (Beisan)
Beth Gubrin /Maresha	בית גוברין	Ἐλευθερόπολις (Eleutheropolis)	Betogabri	بيت جبرين (Bayt Jibrin)
Kefar Othnai	(לגיון) כפר עותנאי	xxx	Caporcotani (Legio)	اللجّون (al-Lajjûn)
Peki'in	פקיעין	Βακὰ	xxx	البقيعة (al-Buqei'a)
Jamnia	יבנה	Ιαμνεία	Iamnia	يبنى (Yibna)
Samaria / Sebaste	שומרון / סבסטי	Σαμάρεια / Σεβαστή	Sebaste	سبسطية (Sabastiyah)
Paneas / Caesarea Philippi	פנייס	Πάνειον (Καισαρεία Φιλίππεια) (Paneion)	Cesareapaneas	بانياس (Banias)
Acre / Ptolemais	עכו	Πτολεμαΐς (Ptolemais); Ἀκχώ (Akchó)	Ptoloma	عكّا (ʻAkka)
Emmaus	אמאוס	Ἀμμαοῦς (Νικορολις) (Nicopolis)	Nicopoli	عمواس ('Imwas)

== See also ==
- Seleucid Empire versus Maccabean Revolt
- History of Palestine
- Ioudaios
- Kitos War
- Judaea (Roman province)
- State of Judea
