= GDRT (disambiguation) =

GDRT May Refer to

- GDRT, King of the Kingdom of Aksum (c. 200)
- Gauteng Department of Roads and Transport, Government road agency in South Africa

== See also ==
- Gadara (disambiguation)
