= Thebes =

Thebes or Thebae may refer to one of the following places:

- Thebes, Egypt, capital of Egypt under the 11th, early 12th, 17th and early 18th Dynasties
- Thebes, Greece, a city in Boeotia
- Phthiotic Thebes or Thessalian Thebes, an ancient city at Nea Anchialos
- Thebae (Cilicia), a town of ancient Cilicia, now in Turkey
- Thebes (Ionia), in Asia Minor
- Cilician Thebe, a.k.a. Thebe Hypoplakia, a mythological city in the Trojan Cilicia, near the Troad
- Thebes, Illinois, a village in the United States
- Thebes Channel, an Egyptian regional television channel

== See also ==
- Thebe (disambiguation)
