= Thebe =

Thebe may refer to:

== People ==
- Thebe (mythology), the name of several female characters in Greek mythology
- Thebe of Pherae, daughter of Jason of Pherae and wife of Alexander of Pherae
- Thebe Neruda Kgositsile, known as Earl Sweatshirt, an American musician
- Thebe Magugu, a South African fashion designer
- Thebe Medupe, a South African astrophysicist

== Other ==
- Thebe (moon), a moon of Jupiter
- Thebe (currency), 1/100 of a Botswana pula
- Thebe Hypoplakia, a city in ancient Anatolia
- Thebe, a character in Shadow Labyrinth

== See also ==
- Thebes (disambiguation)
