= Gadarene =

Gadarene may refer to:

- Of or pertaining to Gadara, an ancient city that is nowadays ruins in Umm Qais, Jordan
- Exorcism of the Gerasene demoniac, also known as "miracle of the Gadarene swine", a miracle of Jesus
- Gadarene Lake, Antarctica
- Gadarene Ridge, Antarctica

== See also ==
- Gadara (disambiguation)
