= Peraia =

Peraia, and Peraea or Peræa (from Ancient Greek: ἡ περαία, hē peraia, "land across") in Classical Antiquity referred to "a community's territory lying 'opposite', predominantly (but not exclusively) a mainland possession of an island state" according to Karl-Wilhelm Welwei. Notable examples include:

- the peraia of Mytilene, which already in the 8th and 7th centuries BC comprised a number of coastal towns from the mouth of the Hellespont to the southern end of the Bay of Adramyttium. It lost this territory to Athens after its failed rebellion in 427 BC against Athenian domination, but appears to have re-acquired a peraia by the mid-4th century BC.
- the Rhodian Peraia, the possessions of Rhodes in southwestern Asia Minor between the 5th century BC and the 1st century BC. Originally comprising parts of coastal Caria, after the Treaty of Apamea this briefly expanded to cover most of Caria and Lycia.
- the peraia of Samos, which established control in ca. 700 BC over the opposite Asian coast from Marathesium to Trogilium and the town of Thebes at Mycale. Possession of the settlements of Carium and Dryussa on Mycale was disputed with Priene until the 2nd century BC, when it was settled through the arbitration of Rhodes.
- the peraia of Samothrace, established by the 5th century BC and stretching from Mesembria to the mouth of the Evros River on the coast of Thrace. It partly survived into the Roman period.
- the peraia of Tenedos, originally south of Sigeum. It survived into the Roman period, but was very limited.
- the peraia of Thasos, established on the coast of Thrace in the 8th century BC and expanded until it comprised the coast between the Strymon and Nestos rivers, as well as the colony of Stryme. It lost control following its failed uprising against Athenian hegemony in 464 BC, but recovered it after the defeat of Athens in the Peloponnesian War and retained it until the late 4th century BC, when the Macedonians took it over. In the 1st century BC, however, the Romans returned it to Thasos.
- the city of Myus was disputed as a peraia between Miletus and Magnesia on the Maeander.
- the Perachora peninsula in Greece, which took its name from its location across from Corinth.
- Perateia was used as a generic term for the post-1204 Crimean possessions of the Empire of Trebizond, including both Greek communities of the area, that is the Khersonites on the southwestern tip of the peninsula (a Protáton republic until its 1299 destruction by a Mongol onslaught), and the Bosporians east of Sudak.
- Perea, also spelled Peraea/Peræa, part of the Herodian Kingdom, now in modern Jordan.

== Sources ==
- Constantakopoulou, Christy (2007). "7. Beyond insularity: islands and their peraiai". The Dance of the Islands: Insularity, Networks, the Athenian Empire, and the Aegean World. Oxford University Press. pp. 228–253. ISBN 978-0-199215959.
