= Dan Warner =

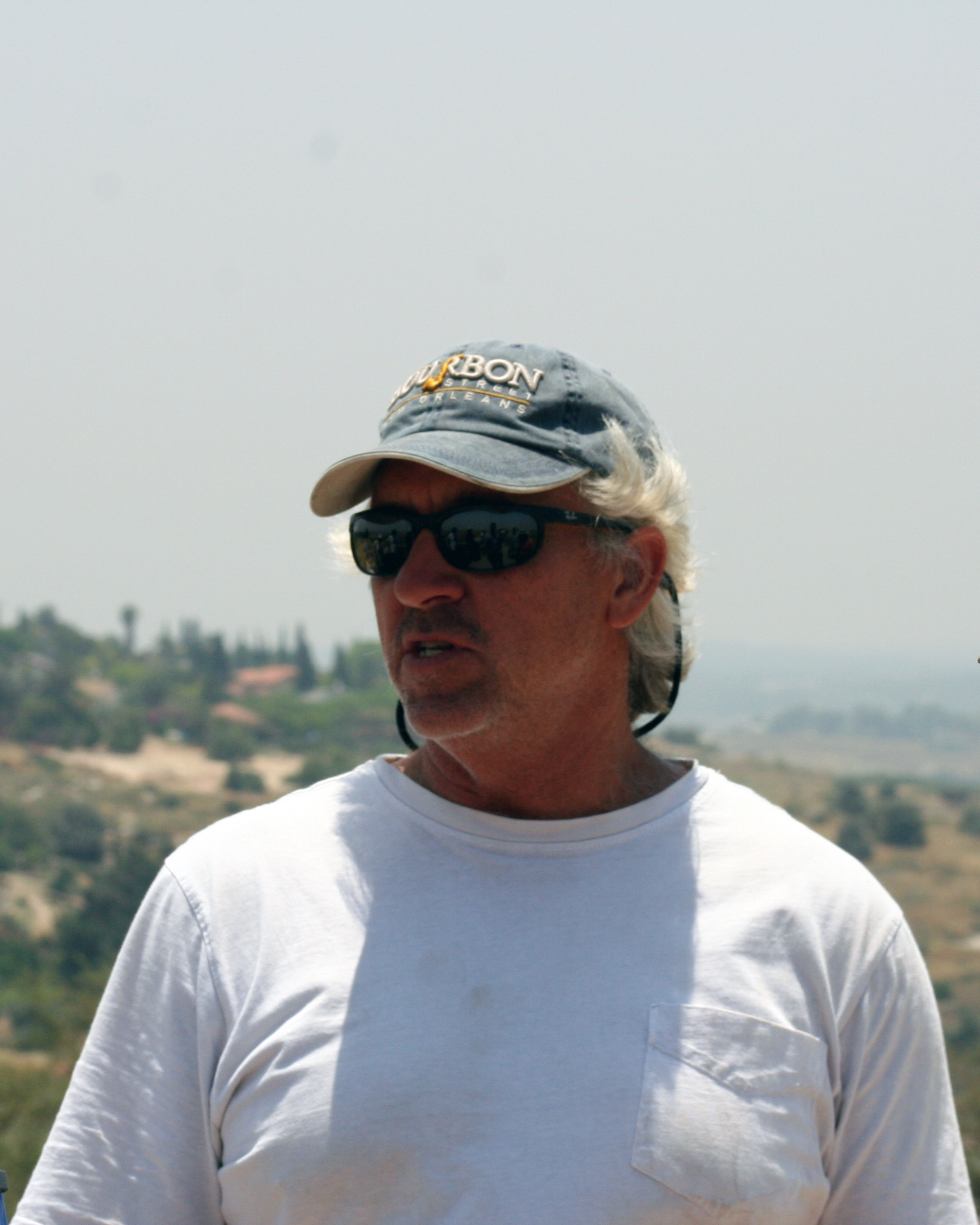
Dan Warner teaching at Tel Gezer, Israel in 2011.

Dan Warner is the former Director for The Michael and Sara Moskau Institute of Archaeology and the Center for Archaeological Research, and former professor of Old Testament and Archaeology at the biblically inerrantist New Orleans Baptist Theological Seminary, and is a co-director of the Tel Gezer Water System excavation and preservation project. He has also served various roles on other excavations at Tel Kabri, Megiddo, Tell el-Far'ah, Gerar, and Ashkelon.

== Tel Gezer - Canaanite Water Tunnel/Gate Complex ==
In 2010, a team from the New Orleans Baptist Theological Seminary ("NOBTS") launched an effort to clear a massive water tunnel, discovered first by Macalister over a hundred years earlier. Macalister never fully excavated the tunnel because a strong storm blew debris back into the tunnel and he considered it too expensive and time consuming to re-excavate the site. The NOBTS effort to re-clear and examine the tunnel has been chronicled in multiple sources including the Biblical Archaeology Review and the Baptist Press. In 2011 professor Dennis Cole, archaeologist Dan Warner and engineer Jim Parker from NOBTS, led another team in an attempt to finish the effort. In just two years the teams removed approximately 299 tons of debris from the ancient water system.

IThe first two years were spent removing large quantities of debris, mainly rock and dirt..

In 2012, the Gezer team uncovered a large open cavern at the bottom of the water system. Said Dr. Warner" “Opening the cave is something we have been working toward for three summers wondering if it even existed...It gave me a rush. Once inside it gave us a sense of accomplishment and satisfaction, but we are not done by a long shot.”

In 2013, the team began an effort to preserve the ancient Canaanite mudbrick gate and complex near the water system. "Most of the first two weeks of the dig were spent searching for the bottom step and cleaning Macalister’s causeway. Tons of debris and rocks were removed in the process. When the bottom step was located and the causeway area clear, the team excavated three probes in the pool area. Each of the pool probes reached a depth of more than six feet before the end of the season and the bottom of the pool was discovered in only one probe (Eastern probe) — the one just below the bottom step of the water shaft."

Also in 2011, BorderStone Press launched a "Research Israel" project in cooperation with NOBTS to participate in the dig and to document and publish a book on the findings.

== Virtual Bible Project ==
In 1999, Warner started The Virtual Bible Project with archaeologist James Strange, (University of South Florida) who excavated Sepphoris. "Our goal is to create the whole ancient world," Warner said. Since that time they have painstakingly reconstructed Bronze Age Megiddo, Capernaum and Herod's Jerusalem, the latter of which is available on YouTube.

"Biblical archaeology gives us a window into the context of the biblical world," Warner said. "It helps us realize (that the people of the Bible) were real people, in a real time, and in a real place. They lived in houses, they had families, they had jobs."

"It helps us understand the biblical text through material remains and gives us illustrations of cultural situations that people participated in," he said. "It clarifies and provides information that is not mentioned in the biblical text."

== Education ==
- PhD - Trinity College & University of Bristol, England (2007)
- ThM - Grace Theological Seminary, Winona Lake Indiana (1984)
- BA - Spurgeon Baptist Bible College, Florida (1972)

== Publications ==
- 2015 - Introduction to Biblical Archeology, in preparation, Zondervan
- 2015 - Canaanite Religion, in preparation, Borderstone Press
- 2013 - "The Gezer Water System, Is There Light at the End of the Tunnel" Results From the 2010–2012 Excavations, forthcoming, Cura Aquarum
- 2013 - Co-Editor, Festschrift for Dr. James Strange, in preparation, Borderstone Press
- 2013 - Biblical Terrain Model & Archaeological Reconstructions (Jerusalem), in preparation, Logos
- 2012 - "Archeological Reconstructions", Revised NIV Study Bible, Zondervan
- 2011 - "Archaeological Reconstructions", Essential Bible Companion to Life in Bible Times, Zondervan
- 2008 - The Archaeology of Canaanite Cult: An Analysis of Canaanite Temples from the Middle and Late Bronze Age in Palestine, VDM Verlag Dr. Müller Aktiengesellschaft & Co. KG
- 2007 - "Archaeological/Historical Reconstructions", The New Testament in Antiquity, Zondervan
- 2007 - Photo editor, Revised Zondervan Pictorial Bible Dictionary, Zondervan
- 2005 - "The Metaphor of 'Sheep' and 'Shepherd' and the Security of God's Flock", from the Old Testament - Inter School Christian Fellowship Group of Presentation College (San Fernando, South Trinidad)
- 2004 - "Ashkelon" - Sola Scriptura Journal, Faith Baptist Bible College (Kerala, India)
- 2004 - "Altars in the Archaeological Record" - Sola Scriptura Journal, Faith Baptist Bible College (Kerala, India)
- 2004 - "Gate Keeper" - Sola Scriptura Journal, Faith Baptist Bible College (Kerala, India)
- 2004 - "The Gate in Scripture" - Sola Scriptura Journal, Spring Vol. 6 (Orlando, FL)
- 2001 - "Abraham's Journey", Interactive CD - The Virtual Bible (Orlando, FL)
- 1990 - "The Divided Kingdom", A Teachers Guide and Student Manual - Regular Baptist Press (Schaumburg IL)
