= Gezer =

Archaeological site in the foothills of the Judaean Mountains

- גזר (Hebrew)
- Tel Gezer/Tell Jezar/Tell el-Jazari
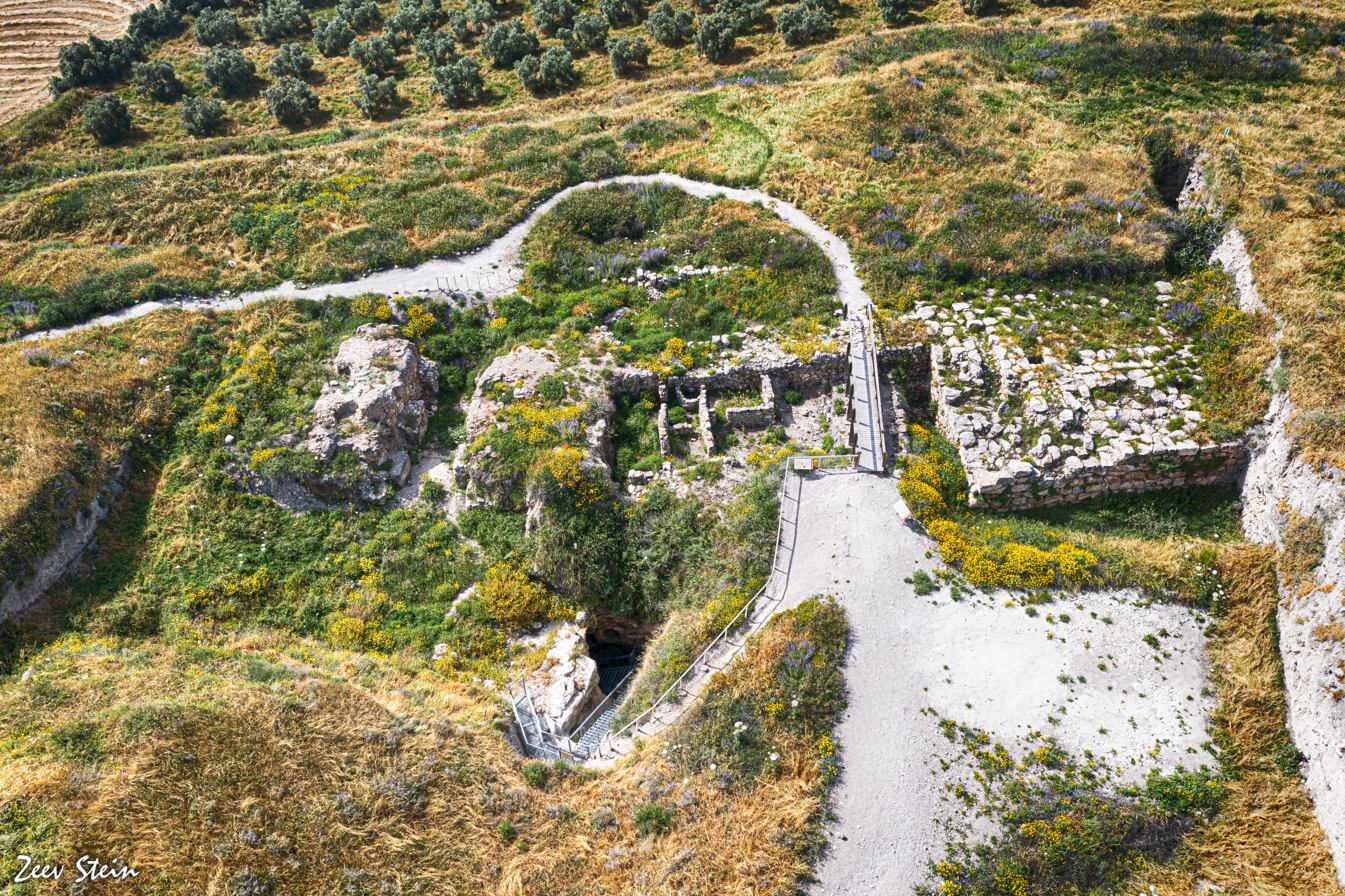
- View of Gezer

- Location within Central Israel Location within Israel
- 31°51′32.4″N 34°55′8.4″E
- Type: Ancient city
- Location: Central District, Israel
- Region: Shephelah
- Grid position: 142/140 PAL

Site notes
- Condition: In ruins
- Owner: National Park
- Management: INPA
- Public access: yes
- Website: Gezer National Park website

Gezer (Hebrew: גזר) is an archaeological site in the foothills of the Judaean Mountains at the border of the Shephelah roughly midway between Jerusalem and Tel Aviv in central Israel. It is now an Israeli national park. In the Hebrew Bible, Gezer is associated with Joshua and Solomon. Gezer rises to an elevation of 229 metres (751 ft) above sea-level, and affords a commanding prospect of the plains to the west, north, and east.

Gezer became a major fortified Canaanite city-state in the first half of the 2nd millennium BCE. It was later destroyed by fire and rebuilt. It is first mentioned in several ancient Egyptian inscriptions. Its importance was due in part to the strategic position it held at the crossroads of the ancient coastal trade route linking Egypt with Syria, Anatolia and Mesopotamia, and the road to Jerusalem and Jericho, both important trade routes. In Roman and Byzantine times, the site was sparsely populated. Later, In the modern era, Gezer was the site of the depopulated Palestinian Arab village of Abu Shusha, the residents of which fled, and others were massacred by Givati Brigade during the 1948 Arab–Israeli War.

== Sources ==
=== Biblical conquest under Joshua ===
In biblical times, Gezer, which lay on the outskirts of Jewish land, was incorporated at a later time. The biblical story of the Israelite conquest of Canaan under their leader Joshua mentions a certain "king of Gezer" (Joshua 10:33) who had gone to help his countrymen in Lachish, where he met his death. Gezer is listed in the Book of Joshua as one of the cities allotted to the tribe of Ephraim, as well as a Levitical city, one of ten allotted to the Levite children of Kehoth – the Kohathites (Joshua, ch. 21). Eusebius (4th century CE), describing the biblical Gezer of his day, writes:

Gazer [sic]. The lot of Ephraim, set aside for Levites. And Joshua besieged it, killing its king (Josh. 10:33). Solomon also built here (1 Kings 9:15–16). It is now called Gazara, a village of Nikopolis (Emmaus), [which is a place located] 4 milestones from it in the north. The tribe of Ephraim did not expel the foreigners from it (Judges 1:29).

==== The Egyptian sack of Gezer ====
According to the Hebrew Bible, the only source for this particular event, the Sack of Gezer took place at the beginning of the 10th century BCE, when the city was conquered and burned by an unnamed Egyptian pharaoh, identified by some with Siamun, during his military campaign in Philistia. This anonymous Egyptian pharaoh then gave it to King Solomon as the dowry of his daughter. Solomon then rebuilt Gezer and fortified it.

The Bible states:

This is the account of the forced labor that King Solomon conscripted to build the house of the Lord and his own house, the Millo and the wall of Jerusalem, Hazor, Megiddo, Gezer, Lower Beth-horon, Baalath, Tamar in the wilderness, within the land, as well as all of Solomon's storage cities, the cities for his chariots, the cities for his cavalry, and whatever Solomon desired to build... (Pharaoh king of Egypt had gone up and captured Gezer and burned it with fire, and had killed the Canaanites who lived in the city, and had given it as dowry to his daughter, Solomon's wife;

— (1 Kings 9:15–16)

==== Identifying the biblical pharaoh ====
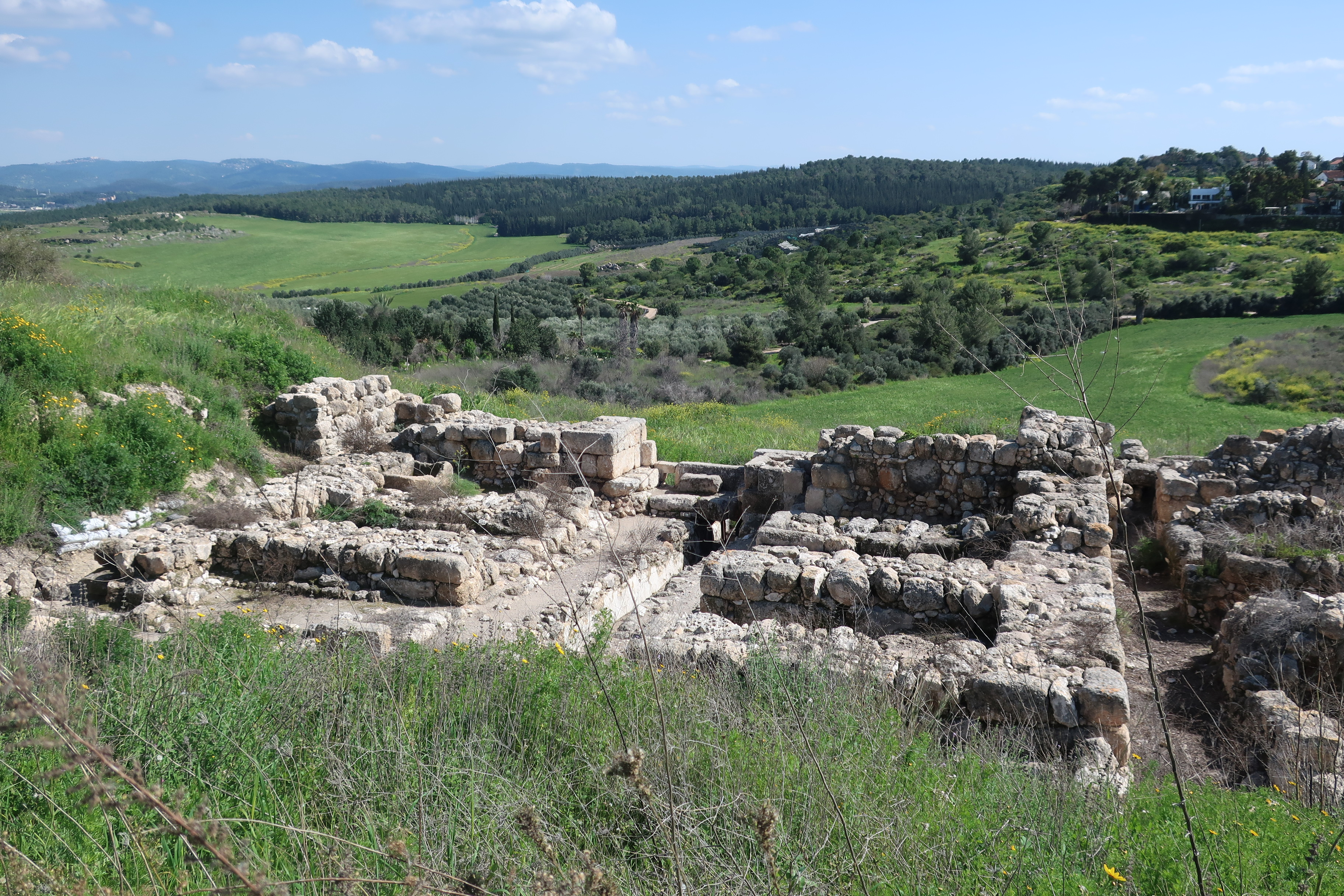
The Archaeological ruin of Gezer

The only mention in the Bible of a pharaoh who might be Siamun (ruled 986–967 BCE) is the text from 1 Kings quoted above, and we have no other historical sources that clearly identify what really happened. As shown below, Kenneth Kitchen believes that Siamun conquered Gezer and gave it to Solomon. Others such as Paul S. Ash and Mark W. Chavalas disagree, and in 2001 Chavalas states that "it is impossible to conclude which Egyptian monarch ruled concurrently with David and Solomon". Professor Edward Lipinski argues that Gezer, then unfortified, was destroyed late in the 10th century (and thus not contemporary with Solomon) and that the most likely Pharaoh was Shoshenq I (ruled 943–922 BCE). However, the archaeological evidence recovered at the site indicates that Gezer was previously destroyed in an earlier stratum, around the times of Siamun.

Lindelle C. Webster's excavation team concluded recently that correlation of Stratum IX, in Tel Gezer, with Solomon's era and Siamun "[is] improbable [as the end] of Tandy Stratum 10A is estimated by [radiocarbon] within the 11th century BCE, contemporary with the 21st Dynasty of Egypt but too early for Solomon by any estimate," and that correlation of Stratum 7 "with Shishak/[Shoshenq I]'s [e]nd boundary, (927–885 BCE, 68.3% hpd), [included in] the biblical date for Shishak's campaign [d]oes not fit well with current [radiocarbon]-based estimates for [Shoshenq I]." They estimate Shoshenq I's reign within the Stratum 8 destruction of Tel Gezer, which has been radiocarbon dated to the mid-10th century BCE (c. 969-940 BCE with 68.3% hpd, and 991-930 BCE with 95.4% hpd).

==== Tanis temple relief ====
One fragmentary but well-known surviving triumphal relief scene from the Temple of Amun at Tanis believed to be related to the sack of Gezer depicts an Egyptian pharaoh smiting his enemies with a mace. According to the Egyptologist Kenneth Kitchen, this pharaoh is Siamun. The pharaoh appears here "in typical pose brandishing a mace to strike down prisoners(?) now lost at the right except for two arms and hands, one of which grasps a remarkable double-bladed axe by its socket." The writer observes that this double-bladed axe or 'halberd' has a flared crescent-shaped blade which is close in form to the Aegean-influenced double axe but is quite distinct from the Canaanite double-headed axe, which has a different shape that resembles an X. Thus, Kitchen concludes Siamun's foes were the Philistines, who were descendants of the Aegean-based Sea Peoples and that Siamun was commemorating his recent victory over them at Gezer by depicting himself in a formal battle scene relief at the temple in Tanis. Alternatively, Paul S. Ash had put forward a detailed argument that Siamun's relief portrays a fictitious battle. He points out that in Egyptian reliefs Philistines are never shown holding an axe, and that there is no archaeological evidence for Philistines using axes. He also argues that there is nothing in the relief to connect it with Philistia or the Levant.

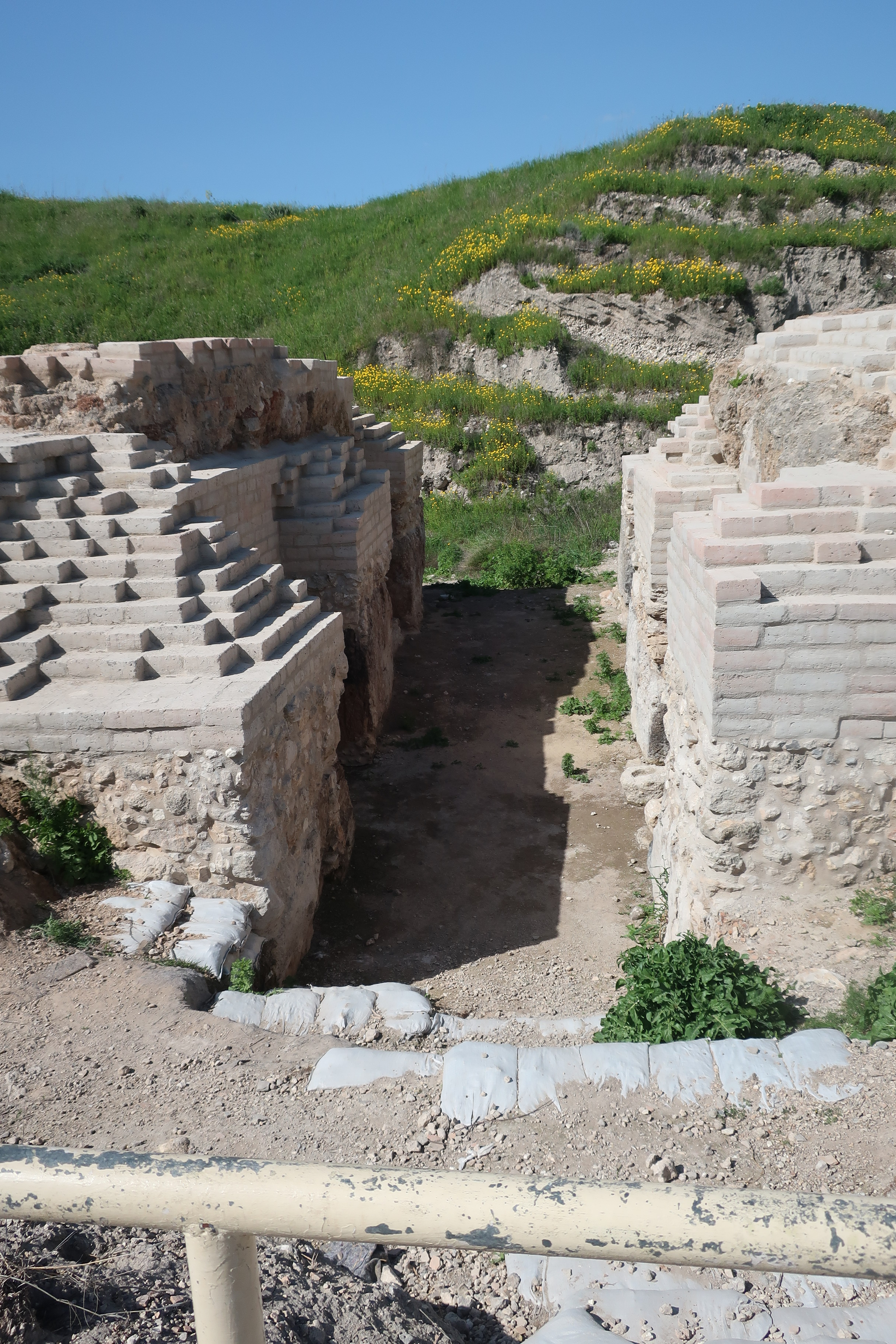
Canaanite gateway at Tel Gezer flanked by two towers (now in ruin)

== Location ==
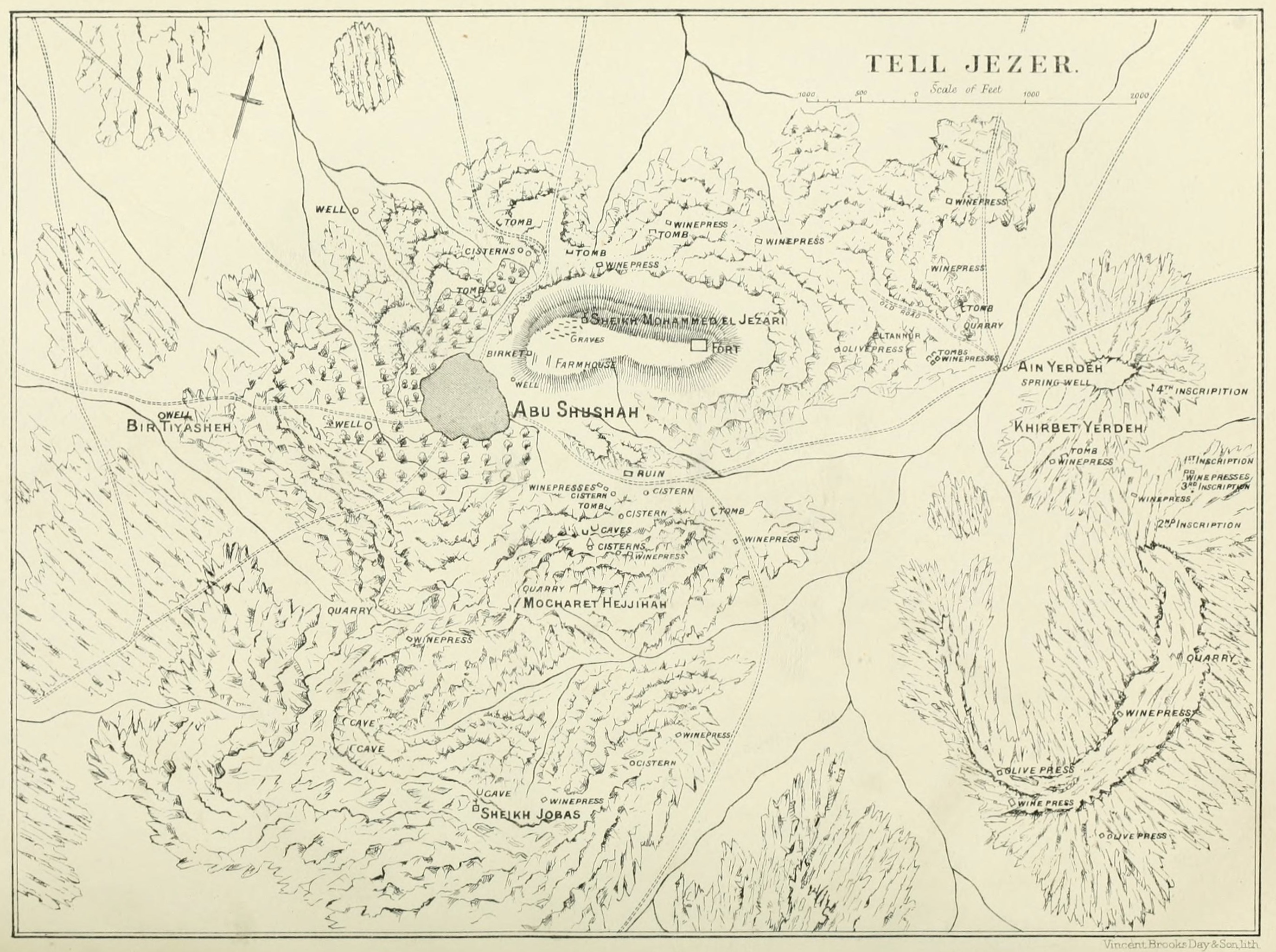
Tell Jezer from the 1871-77 PEF Survey of Palestine, also showing Abu Shusha

Gezer was located on the northern fringe of the Shephelah region, approximately 30 km (19 mi) northwest of Jerusalem. It was strategically situated at the junction of the Via Maris, the international coastal highway, and the highway connecting it with Jerusalem through the valley of Ayalon, or Ajalon. The nearest modern-Israeli settlement to the archaeological site is Karmei Yosef.

Verification of the identification of this site with biblical Gezer comes from a dozen bilingual inscriptions in either Hebrew or Aramaic, and Greek, found engraved on rocks several hundred meters from the tell. These inscriptions from the 1st century BCE read "boundary of Gezer" and "of Alkios" (probably the governor of Gezer at the time). The discovery of these boundary stones near the archaeological site makes it the first biblical city to be positively identified.

Today's archaeological site spans an area of 130 dunams (32 acres), and contains 26 levels of settlement, from the Chalcolithic to the early Roman periods (3500 BCE to 100 CE). Most of the remains date from the Middle and Late Canaanite and the Israelite periods.

== History ==
=== Chalcolithic ===
The first settlement established at Tel Gezer dates to the end of the 4th millennium BCE during the Chalcolithic period, when large caves cut into the rock were used as dwellings.

- Strata 14 (XXVI) LC, Beersheban Chalcolithic.

=== Early Bronze Age ===
At the beginning of the Early Bronze Age (early 3rd millennium BCE), an unfortified settlement covered the tell. It was destroyed in the middle of the 3rd millennium BCE and subsequently abandoned for several centuries.

- Strata 13 (XXV) EB IB.
- Hiatus
- Strata 12 (XXIV) EB IIA. Resettlement
- Strata 11 (XXIII) EB IIB. Structural remains.
- Hiatus until Stratum 10 (XXI) MB IIB. The lack of EB III is significant, with no Khirbet Kerak Ware.

=== Middle Bronze Age ===
==== Middle Bronze I ====
In Middle Bronze I (MB I; c. 2000-1800 BCE), there was a hiatus in the occupation.

==== Middle Bronze II ====
In Middle Bronze IIA (MB IIA, c. 1820/1800-1630 BCE), there was a hiatus in the occupation.

In the Middle Bronze Age IIB (MBIIB), Gezer became a major city, well fortified and containing a large cultic site. It may have grown due to MBIIA-sites like Aphek becoming weaker.

- Stratum 10 (XXI) MB IIB
- Stratum 9 (XX) MB IIB-C
- Stratum XVIII MB III/LB IA

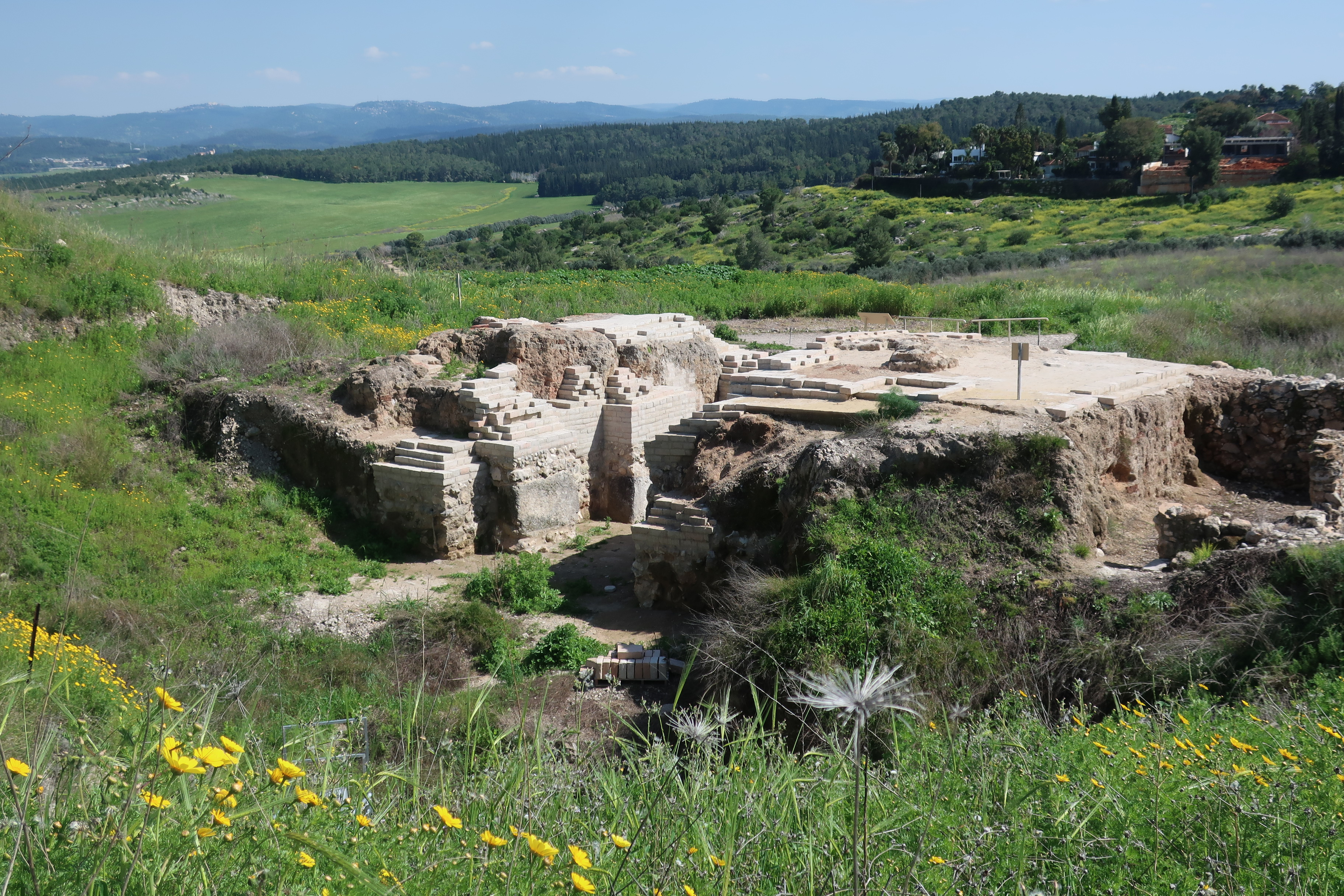
Ruined tower at Tel Gezer

Fortifications

On the north side of the city, the fortifications consisted of at least two lines of defense surrounding the tell. Some excavators have noted as many as three defensive walls built in different periods: an outer earthen rampart, a central wall and an inner wall. In what remained of the outer rampart, it reached a height of about 5 metres, and was built of compacted alternating layers of chalk and earth covered with plaster. The inner wall measured 4 metres in width and was made of large stone blocks, reinforced with towers. The city gate stood near the southwest corner of the wall, was flanked by two towers which protected the wooden doors, a common design for its time. The tell was surrounded by a massive stone wall and towers, protected by a five-meter-high (16 ft) earthen rampart covered with plaster. The wooden city gate, near the southwestern corner of the wall, was fortified by two towers.

Cultic site with massebot

Cultic remains discovered in the northern part of the tell were a row of ten large standing pillars, known as massebot or matsevot, singular masseba/matseva, oriented north–south, the tallest of which was three meters high, with an altar-type structure in the middle, and a large, square, stone basin, probably used for cultic libations. The exact purpose of these megaliths is still debated, but they may have constituted a Canaanite "high place" from the Middle Bronze Age, ca. 1600 BCE, each masseba possibly representing a Canaanite city connected to Gezer by treaties enforced by rituals performed here. Both the number and size of the standing stones confer a unique character to this cultic site. Such massebot are found elsewhere in the country, but those from Gezer massebot are the most impressive examples. The area was almost completely cleared by Macalister. The remains were re-excavated in 1968. A double cave beneath the high place was shown to be predating it and not connected to it.

=== Late Bronze Age ===
==== Egyptian Period ====
In the Late Bronze Age (second half of the 2nd millennium BCE) a new city wall, 4 m (13 ft) thick, was erected outside the earlier one. It is a very rare example of Late Bronze Age fortifications in the country, witness for the elevated political status of Gezer in southern Canaan during Egyptian rule.

- Stratum XVII LB IB (unexcavated)
- Stratum XVI/13 LB IIA (two walls of a monumental building)
- Stratum XV/12B LB IIB (elite building)

==== Thutmosid Period (c. 1479-1411 BCE) ====
Thutmose III mentions Gezer as captured during his first campaign on his Topographical List on the walls of the Precinct of Amun-Re, at Karnak.

N29 G1 I10 Z4 D21 Z1 or N29 G1 U28 G1 D21 Z1 T14 N25
ḳꜣḏjr or ḳꜣḏꜣꜣr
in hieroglyphs
Era: New Kingdom
(1550–1069 BC)

The Canaanite city was destroyed in a fire, presumably in the wake of a campaign by the Egyptian pharaoh Thutmose III (ruled 1479–1425 BCE). A destruction layer from this event was found in all excavated areas of the tell.

Thutmose IV refers to Hurrian captives from [Gezer] (broken inscription) in his mortuary temple at Thebes.

==== Amarna Period (c. 1350 BCE) ====
The Amarna letters mention kings of Gezer swearing loyalty to the Egyptian pharaoh. The Tell Amarna letters, dating from the 14th century BCE, include ten letters from the kings of Gezer swearing loyalty to the Egyptian pharaoh. The city-state of Gezer (named Gazru in Babylonian) was ruled by at least three leaders during the 20-year period covered by the Amarna letters. Discoveries of several pottery vessels, a cache of cylinder seals and a large scarab with the cartouche of Egyptian pharaoh Amenhotep III attest to the existence of a city at Gezer's location in the 14th century BCE—one that was apparently destroyed in the next century—and suggest that the city was inhabited by Canaanites with strong ties to Egypt.

In the 14th century BCE, a palace was constructed on the high western part of the tell, the city's acropolis. Archaeologists also discovered remains of what might have been the Egyptian governor's residence from the same period in the northern part of the tell.

==== Ramesside Period ====
19th Dynasty. In the late reign of Ramesses II, climate became drier and colder causing turmoil in the Mediterranean from around 1250 BCE, eventually leading to the Late Bronze collapse. The death of Ramesses II caused cities in Canaan to rebel to become independent.

Merneptah of Egypt, who succeeded Ramesses II, had to regain control and boasted about his capture of Gezer. A massive fiery destruction seems to support this in excavations done by Prof. Steven Ortiz. Gezer is mentioned in the victory stele of Merneptah, dating from the end of the 13th century BCE, which states: "Plundered is the Canaan with every evil; carried off is Ashkelon; seized upon is Gezer; Yanoam is made as that which does not exist; Israel is laid waste, his seed is not". At Amada, an inscription claim Mernpetah as the "subduer of Gezer".

Toward the end of the Bronze Age, the city declined and its population diminished.

=== Iron Age ===
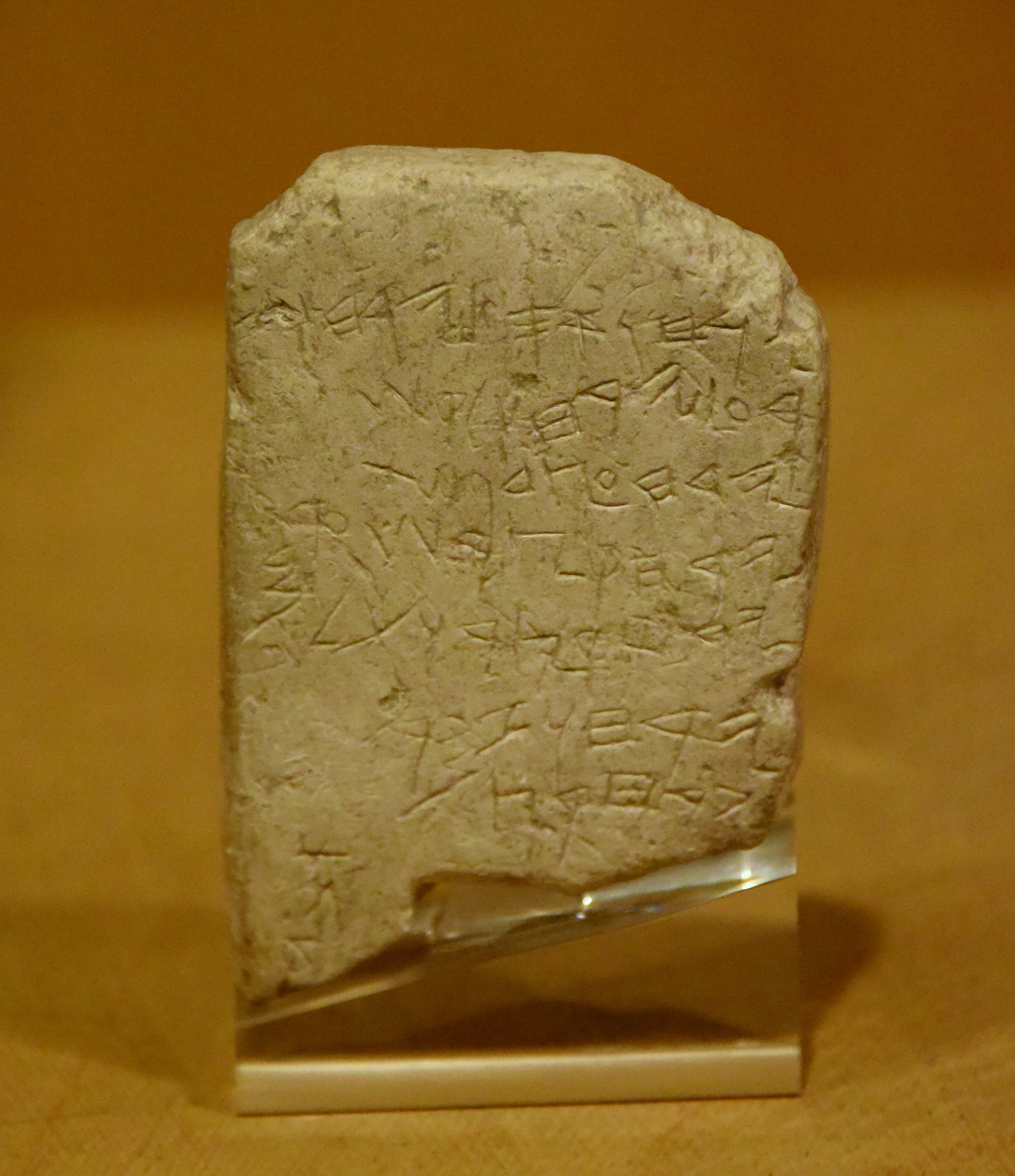
The Gezer Calendar tablet, early Iron Age, 10th century BCE, Museum of Archaeology, Istanbul, Turkey

==== Iron I ====
In 12th and 11th centuries BCE, a large building with many rooms and courtyards was situated on the acropolis. Grinding stones and grains of wheat found among the sherds indicate that it was a granary. Macalister describes the Iron Age construction of an olive press with collecting vats. Local and Philistine vessels attest to a mixed Canaanite/Philistine population.

- Stratum XIV/12A Iron IA (repairs, rebuilding).
- Stratum XIII-XII/11 Iron IA/B (philistine pottery)
- Stratum XI/10B
- Stratum X-IX/10A Iron IB
- Stratum 9 Iron IC/IIA - destroyed by Pharaoh

==== Iron II ====
The 10th century BCE seems to have been a period of notable urban development for the city until it became destroyed in the third quarter of that century, probably as a result of Shoshenq I's campaign in Canaan at that time. Archaeologist William G. Dever estimates its population at around 2,500 during the 10th century BCE.

- Stratum VIII/8 Iron IIA - Solominic Gate, destroyed by Shoshenq I.
- Stratum VII/7 Iron IIA - rebuilt, but shifted to domestic quarters.
- Stratum VI/6B-A Iron IIB.

Siege of Gezer
Date	10th century BCE (biblical account)
Location	Gezer, Israel
Result	Egypt takes Gezer, Egyptian victory

Belligerents
Egypt	Philistines

Commanders and leaders
Siamun (?)	Unknown

Strength
Unknown	Unknown

Casualties and losses
Unknown	Many killed

By the 9th and 8th centuries BCE, the city is estimated by Dever to have had a population of around 3,000 people.

==== Israelite city gate, wall ====
On the southern slope about 200 meters east of the gate from the Middle Bronze Age IIB, there is what is now known as the "Solomon Gate". This area was excavated at the beginning of the 20th century by Macalister, who defined the remains discovered there as a "Maccabean citadel" from the 2nd century BCE, because on one of the stones a curse against Simon was found engraved in Greek (Macalister 1912, vol. I: 209–23; 236–56).

After the discovery of identical gates from the time of King Solomon in Megiddo and Hazor, and following what is told in the Bible about the construction projects of this king in the three cities, Yigael Yadin proved in 1957 that in fact the Hasmonean citadel was no other than a gate from the days of Solomon. In the excavations of the 1960s, the entire gate was revealed. It is identical in plan and size to the other two mentioned and is connected by a casemate wall. On both sides of the passageway within the gate are four pairs of pillars and three pairs of cell-like chambers ("six-chambered gate"). In front of the entranceway stood two towers. At the gate, a construction of hewn-stone in the style typical of the days of Solomon is evident. The Solomonic Gate has since been reinterpreted by some as dating from several centuries later, by virtue of the fact that the gate was rebuilt, although recent radiocarbon tests support an early date for the strata at the site.

==== Tiglath-Pileser III and the Neo-Assyrian period ====
The Neo-Assyrian king Tiglath-Pileser III put Gezer under siege between the years 734 and 732 BCE. The city was probably captured by the Assyrians at the end of the campaign of Tiglath-Pileser III to Canaan. At any rate, a fiery destruction so severe befell the city at this time, insofar that it reduced the upper two courses of stone in the inner casemate wall to powdery lime. A reference to Gezer's destruction appears in a cuneiform relief from the 8th-century BCE royal palace of Tiglath-Pileser III at Nimrud. The city inscribed on the relief is called 'Gazru'.

==== Hellenistic period ====
Stamped Rhodian amphora handles, a Tyrian lead weight of the Tanit series, and a didrachm of Ptolemy VI found in situ suggest a Hellenistic occupation from the end of the 3rd century BCE to 142 BCE.

Gezer became known as Gazara in the Hellenistic period and became an important city for the Hasmonean rulers. According to the book of 1 Maccabees, Simon Thassi captured Gazara and expelled the population during the Maccabean Revolt. He then brought in new settlers of devout Jews and fortified it, making it part of the Hasmonean kingdom. Notwithstanding Simon's capture of Gezer in circa 142 BCE, Josephus alludes to the fact that Gezer returned under Seleucid control in the days of Antiochus VII Sidetes and during the high-priesthood of Simon's son, John Hyrcanus. Archaeologist Ronny Reich identified a cistern at Gazar as a mikveh, a Jewish ritual bath, based on its stepped design, plastering, hydraulic system, and close parallels to known examples from Jerusalem and Jericho, including the use of an otzar (pure rainwater reservoir) connected to the immersion pool. The installation appears to have been added to an earlier Hellenistic-era house, suggesting that Jewish settlers at Gezer repurposed existing buildings following Simon's conquest. This mikveh and the few other examples found at the site support the account in 1 Maccabees, which identifies the inhabitants of Hasmonean Gezer as observant Jews.

Josephus, in both his Antiquities (12.7.4.; 13.6.7.; 13.9.2.) and in the Jewish War (1.2.2.), cites the Book of Maccabees as his primary source for these events and retains the Greek form of the name Gazara (Greek: Γάζαρά), meaning, Gezer.

Elsewhere, Josephus (Jewish War 1.170) wrote that a certain "Gadara" (Greek: Γαδάροις) was one of the five synedria, or regional administrative capitals of the Hasmonean realm, established by Aulus Gabinius, the Roman proconsul of Syria, in 57 BCE. The name has been edited to "Gazara" in the Loeb edition (Jewish War 1.170). However, in this case, other researchers prefer one of two candidates from Transjordan, Gadara in Perea, or Gadara of the Decapolis (see more at Perea and Gadara (disambiguation)).

=== Roman and Byzantine periods ===
Gezer was sparsely populated during Roman times and later times, as other regional population centers took its place. Archaeological finds attesting to the Hellenistic and early Roman periods include two bath houses discovered in situ, as well as a number of ritual baths (mikveh) and rock tombs. (Note: Some of the tomb types discovered in Gezer include Arcosolium and loculus tombs, of which there were five Arcosolium or recessed bench tombs, another five distinct simple double arcosolia type, and nine loculus or kokhim tombs. These are considered to date to the Hellenistic through Byzantine periods, during which periods they were most common.) The site continued to be occupied after the destruction of the Second Temple, but was gradually abandoned during the late Roman-early Byzantine period.

=== Crusader period ===
In 1177, the plains around Gezer were the site of the Battle of Montgisard, in which the Crusaders under Baldwin IV defeated the forces of Saladin. There was a Crusader Lordship of Montgisard and apparently a castle stood there, a short distance from Ramleh.

=== Early modern and modern periods ===
R.A. Stewart Macalister who excavated the ruin in the years 1902–1905 and 1907–1909 has noted that around the year 1869 the mound and other parts of the lands of the village of Abû Shûsheh were acquired by Messrs. Bergheim, who had been bankers in Jerusalem. Their acquisition of these lands would prove "a fortunate circumstance" for the excavator, as the site was later put at the disposal of the Palestine Exploration Fund.

== Archaeological highlights ==
=== Canaanite water system ===
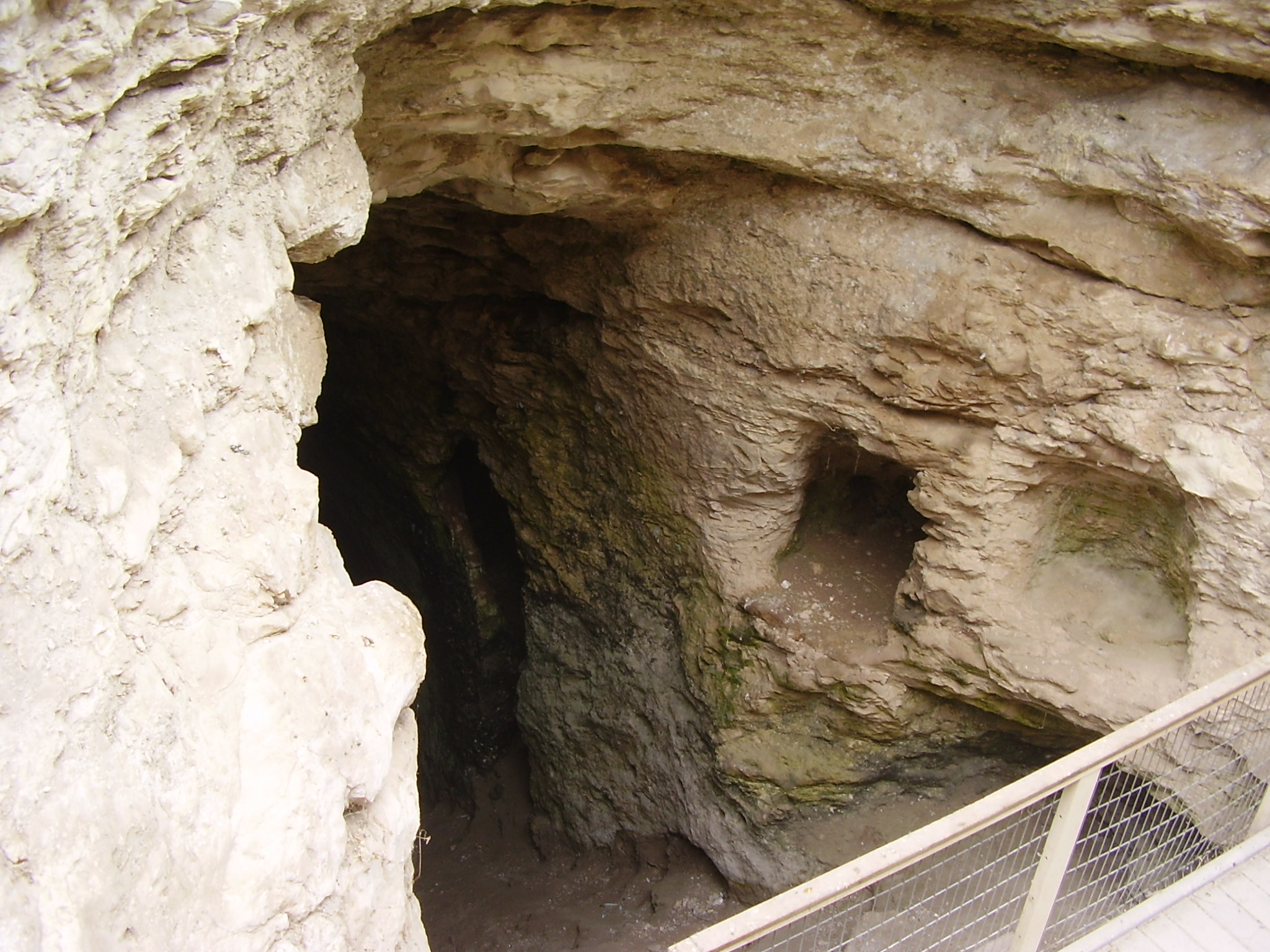
Canaanite water tunnel at Tel Gezer

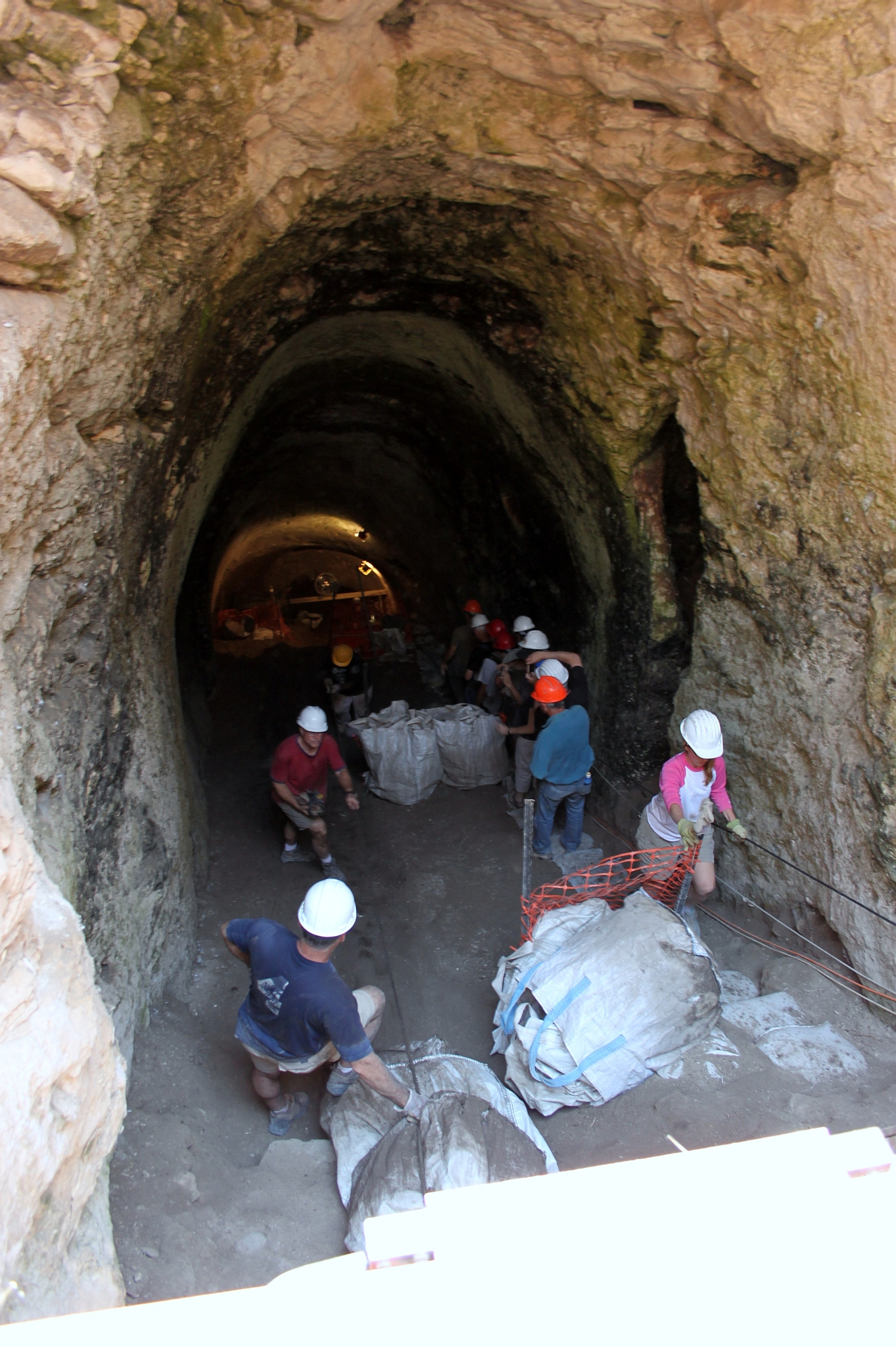
June 3, 2011, excavation by New Orleans Baptist Theological Seminary and the Israeli Parks Authority to clear the Bronze Age water system at Gezer, originally excavated by Macalister. see below

A large Canaanite (Bronze Age) water system comprising a tunnel going down to a spring, similar to those found in Jerusalem, Tel Hazor and Tel Megiddo, was first excavated by Macalister and was re-excavated as part of the 2006–2017 campaigns of the Tel Gezer Excavation and Publication Project.

In 2010 a team from the New Orleans Baptist Theological Seminary ("NOBTS"), in partnership with the Israeli Parks Authority and the Israeli Antiquities Authority, launched an effort to clear a massive water tunnel, discovered first by Macalister over a hundred years earlier. Macalister never fully excavated the tunnel because a strong storm blew debris back into the tunnel and he considered it too expensive and time consuming to re-excavate the site.

In 2011 professor Dennis Cole, archaeologist Dan Warner and engineer Jim Parker from NOBTS, and Tsvika Tsuk from the Israeli Parks Authority, led another team in an attempt to finish the effort. In just two years the teams removed approximately 299 tons of debris from the ancient water system.

In 2012, the team uncovered a large sealed cavern about nine meters beyond the water pool and "Macalister's Causeway."

In 2013, the team began an effort to preserve the ancient Canaanite mudbrick gate and complex near the water system.

In the Water System: "Most of the first two weeks of the dig were spent searching for the bottom step and cleaning Macalister's causeway. Tons of debris and rocks were removed in the process. When the bottom step was located and the causeway area clear, the team excavated three probes in the pool area. Each of the pool probes reached a depth of more than six feet before the end of the season and the bottom of the pool was discovered in only one probe (Eastern probe)—the one just below the bottom step of the water shaft."

The debris removal and excavation continued until the summer of 2017.

=== Gezer calendar ===
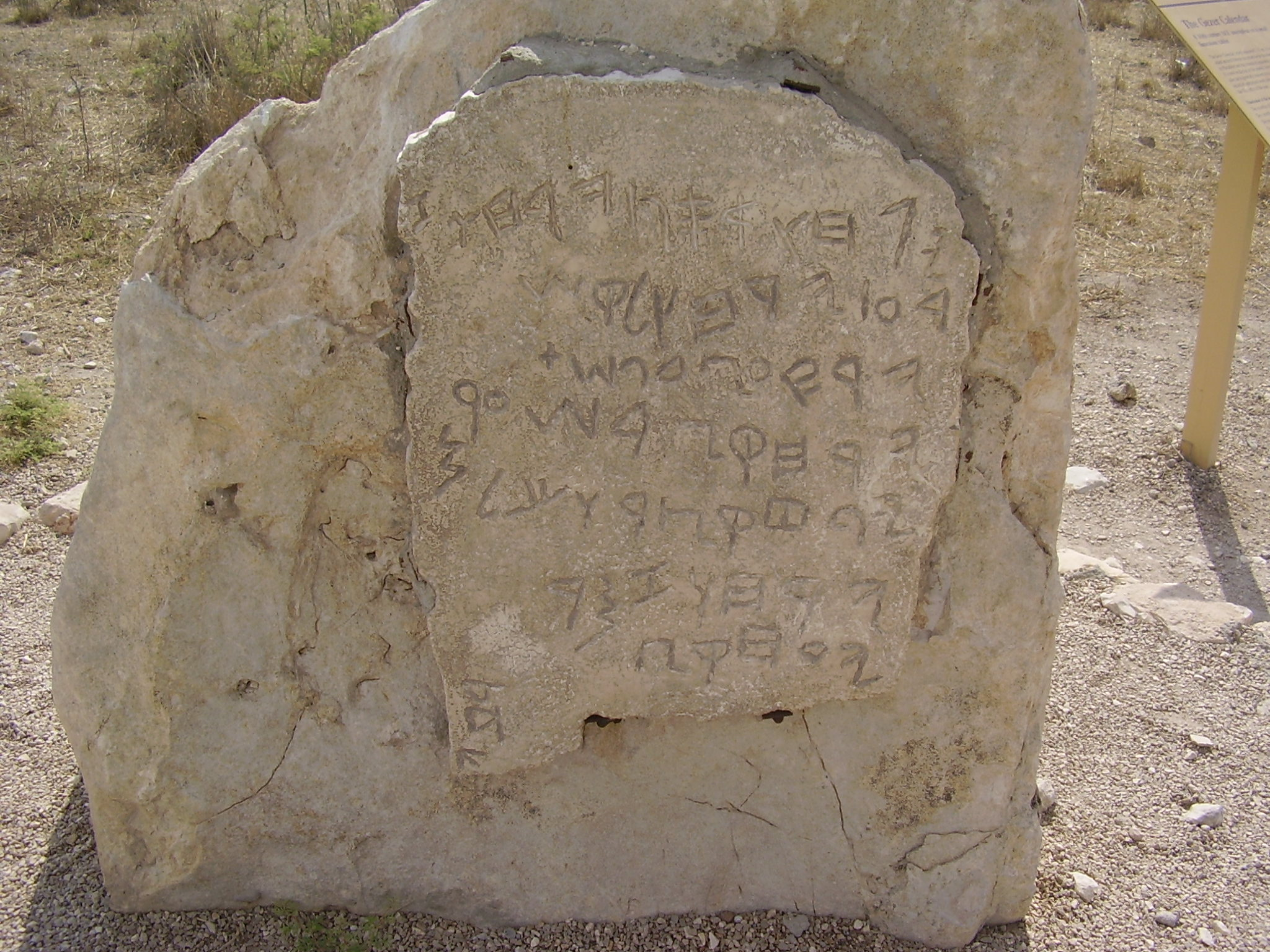
Large replica of the Gezer calendar in Gezer National Park

One of the best-known finds is the "Gezer calendar". This is a plaque containing a text appearing to be either a schoolboy's memory exercises, or a text designated for organising the collection of taxes from farmers. Another possibility is that the text was a popular folk song, or child's song, listing the months of the year according to the agricultural seasons. It has proved to be of value by informing modern researchers of ancient Middle Eastern script and language, as well as the agricultural seasons.

=== Boundary stones ===
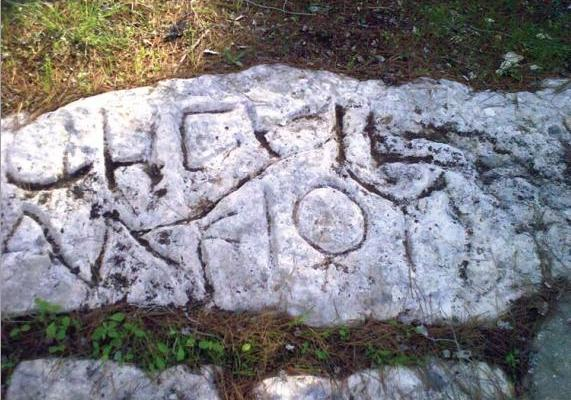
Boundary inscription from Hellenistic Gezer, in Aramaic or Hebrew (top) and Greek (bottom)

Thirteen boundary stones have been identified near the tell, distanced between less than 200 metres to almost 2 km from it, probably dating from the Late Hellenistic period (late 2nd – 1st century BCE), the most recent having been found by archaeologists from SWBTS in 2012. See also Location.

There are only a few "lost" biblical cities that have been positively identified through inscriptions discovered by means of archaeological work (surveys or digs). Gezer is the first among them, thanks to Clermont-Ganneau's discovery of three such inscribed stones in 1874 and of a fourth in 1881.

Ten of the thirteen inscriptions are bilingual, including the first three ones, containing two distinct parts, one in Greek and one either Hebrew or Aramaic, and written in what is known as square Hebrew characters. Clermont-Ganneau's reading of the Hebrew/Aramaic part as "the boundary of Gezer" was later confirmed. The inscriptions' Greek part contains personal names, either (H)alkios, Alexas, or Archelaos, for instance Clermont-Ganneau's four stones were all bearing the inscription "of Alkios". Sometimes the two parts are upside-down, or "tête-bêche", in relation to each other, on the last discovered one the lines being separated by a line and the Hebrew/Aramaic inscription תחמ גזר > "Teḥum Gezer" ("the boundary of Gezer") facing the tell. With the discovery of the last nine inscriptions it became evident that their distribution does not support Clermont-Ganneau's initial interpretation, of them marking Gezer's Sabbath limit, but rather that they probably mark the boundaries between private estates, or between city land and these estates. Analysis of the lettering have led to the conclusion that they were all contemporaneous, with opinions based on palaeography and history slightly diverging in regard to their date – either Hasmonean or Herodian. The earlier date and the Hebrew script can be connected to what is known from the First Book of Maccabees about Simon replacing the gentile inhabitants with Jewish ones (1 Macc. 13:47–48) The later date can be supported by a scenario in which Herod, after acquiring the lands of the vanquished Hasmoneans, gave them to (H)alkios, Archelaos and Alexas, all three names mentioned by Josephus for members of a powerful land-owning family from Herod's court.

==== Language: Hebrew or Aramaic ====
David M. Jacobson wrote that the inscriptions are in Hebrew and that this suggests a need for a closer look at their date.

Other scholars are not convinced that the language of the inscriptions is Hebrew and not Aramaic, leaving both options as possible as is the case in the Corpus Inscriptionum Iudaeae/Palaestinae.

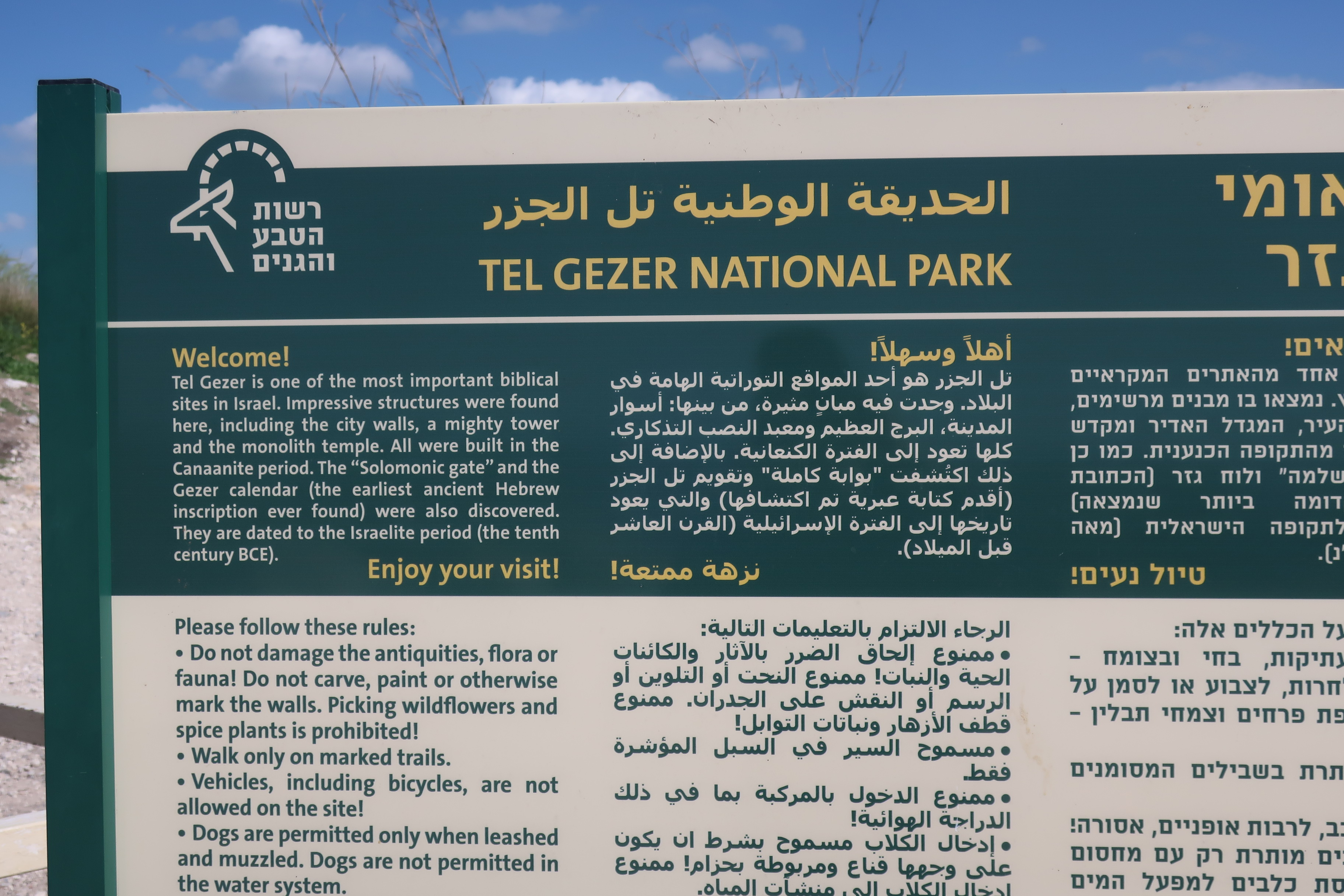
Welcoming sign at Tel-Gezer National Park (Israel Nature and Parks Authority)

=== Egyptian-era remains ===
In July 2017, archaeologists discovered skeletal remains of a family of three, one of the adults and a child wearing earrings, believed to have been killed during an Egyptian invasion in the 13th century BCE. A 13th-century BCE amulet, various scarabs and cylinder seals were also found on the site. The amulet bears the cartouches—or official royal monikers—of the Egyptian pharaohs Thutmose III and Ramses II.

In November 2026, an American teen found a 3,300-year-old Egyptian amulet.

== Archaeological excavation history ==
Archaeological excavation at Gezer has been going on since the early 20th century, and it has become one of the most excavated sites in Israel. The site was identified with ancient Gezer by Charles Simon Clermont-Ganneau in 1871. R. A. Stewart Macalister excavated the site between 1902 and 1909 on behalf of the Palestine Exploration Fund. Twentyone quarterly dig reports were published in the Palestine Exploration Quarterly. Macalister recovered several artifacts and discovered several constructions and defenses. He also established Gezer's habitation strata, though due to poor stratigraphical methods, these were later found to be mostly incorrect (as well as many of his theories). In 1914 and 1921 Raymond-Charles Weill dug there, focusing mainly on the Bronze and Iron Age Tombs. Results were not published due the Weill's assistant Paule Zerlwer-Silberberg dying in a camp in occupied France and the excavation data was lost at that time. Surprisingly, the master thesis of that assistant, about the dig, was recently discovered and was published in 2012. Alan Rowe briefly visited the site in 1934. Between 1964 and 1974 G.E. Wright, William Dever and Joe Seger worked at Gezer on behalf of the Nelson Glueck School of Archaeology in the Hebrew Union College and Harvard University. Dever worked there again in 1984 and 1990, with the Andrews University.

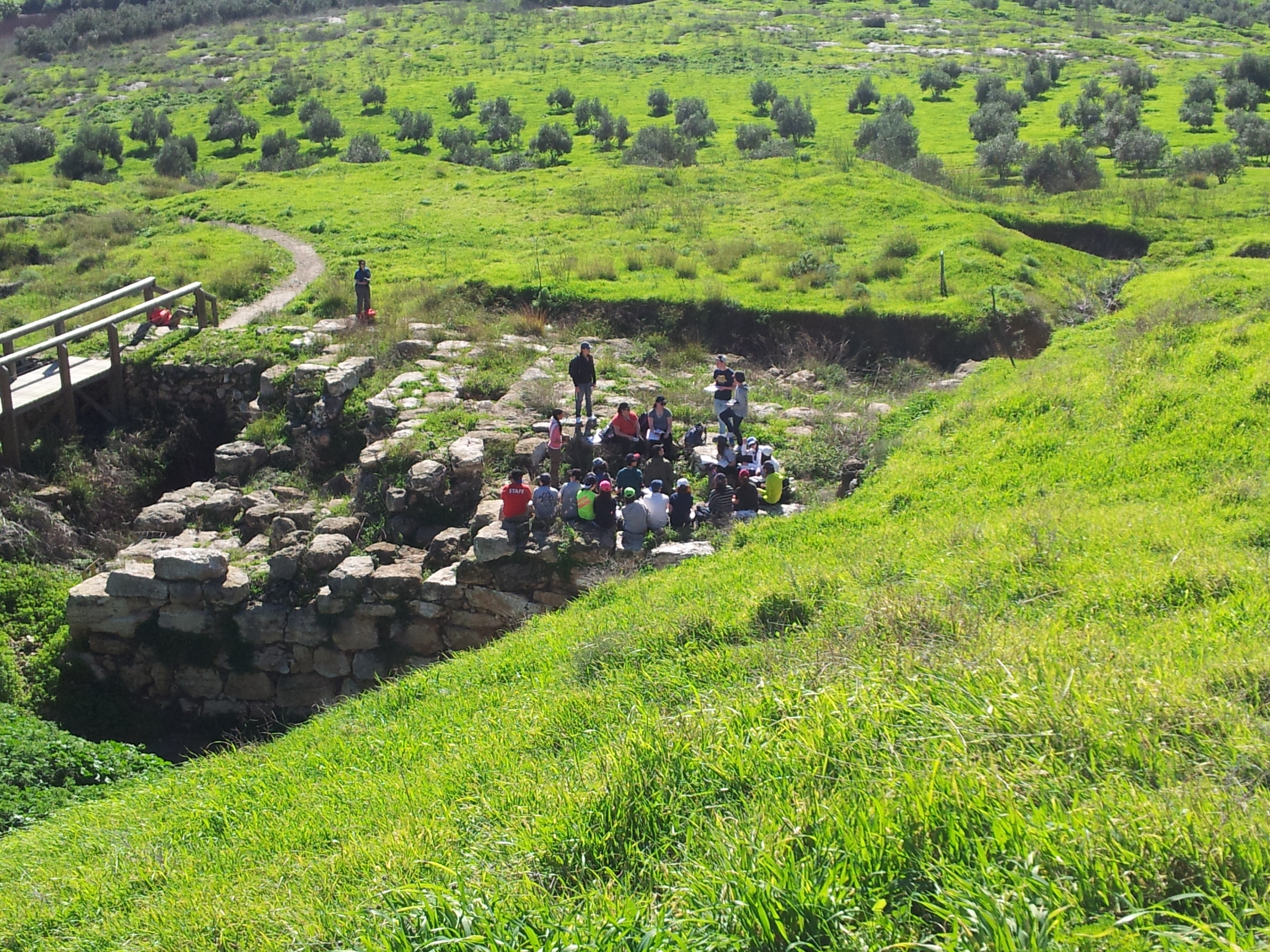
Ruins at Tel Gezer

=== Latest excavations and surveys (2006–2017) ===
Excavations were renewed in June 2006 by a consortium of institutions under the direction of Steve Ortiz of the Southwestern Baptist Theological Seminary (SWBTS) and Sam Wolff of the Israel Antiquities Authority (IAA). The Tel Gezer Excavation and Publication Project is a multi-disciplinary field project investigating the Iron Age history of Gezer. The effort completed in 2017.

The first season of the Gezer excavations concluded successfully and revealed some interesting details. Among other things is a discovery of a thick destruction layer may be dated to the destruction at the hands of the Egyptians, which some associate with the biblical episode from 1 Kings 9:16: "Pharaoh, the king of Egypt, had attacked and captured Gezer, killing the Canaanite population and burning it down. He gave the city to his daughter as a wedding gift when she married Solomon."

In 2013, two separate archaeological survey-excavations were conducted at Tel Gezer, one by Tsvika Tsuk, Yohanan Hagai, and Daniel Warner, on behalf of the IAA, and the other led by a team of archaeologists from the SWBTS and Andrews University's Institute of Archaeology.

=== Gallery ===
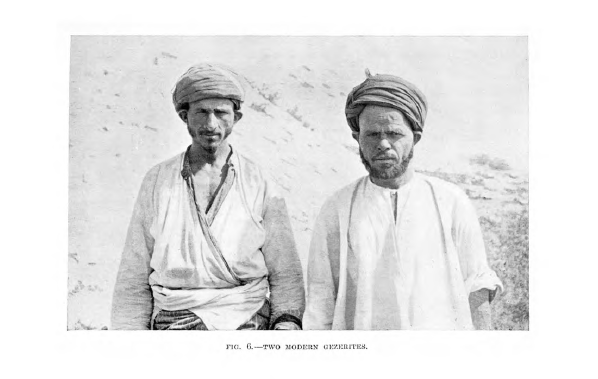

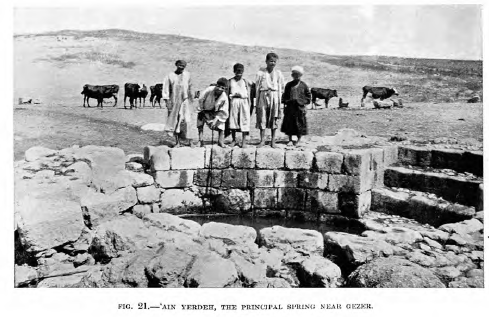

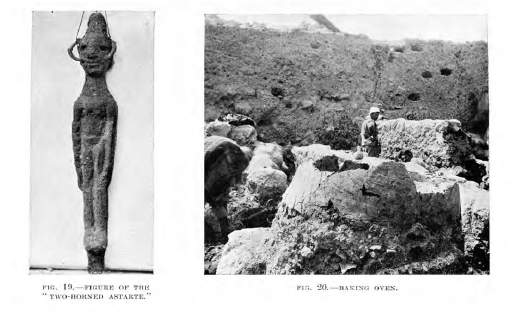

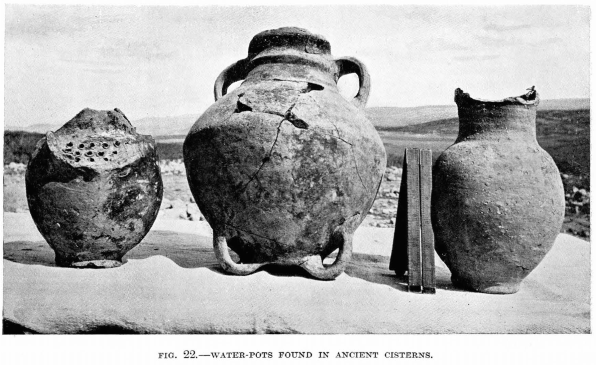

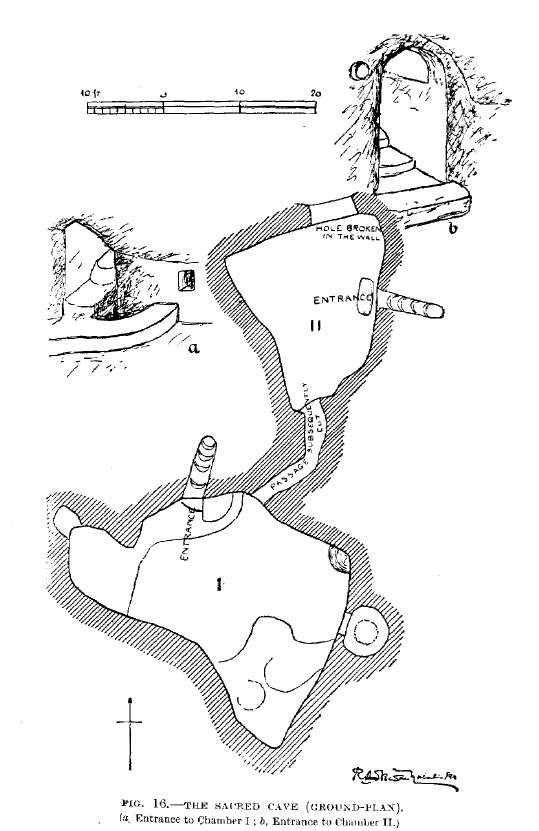

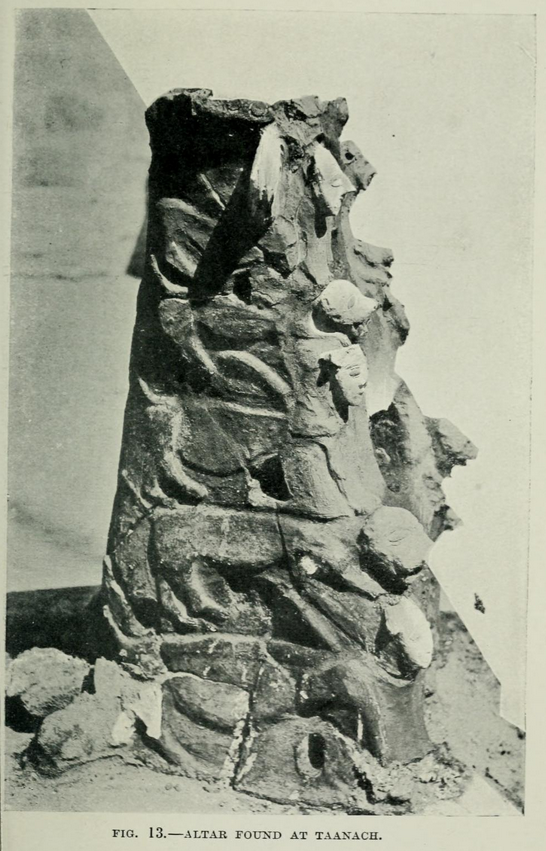

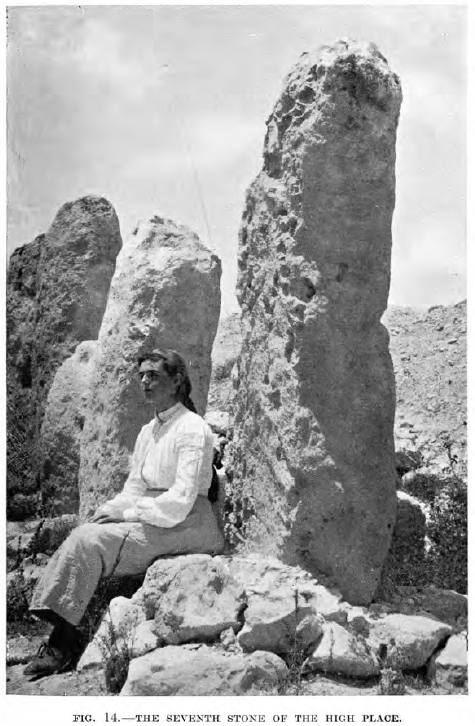
Archaeologist or student with large, numerous massebot

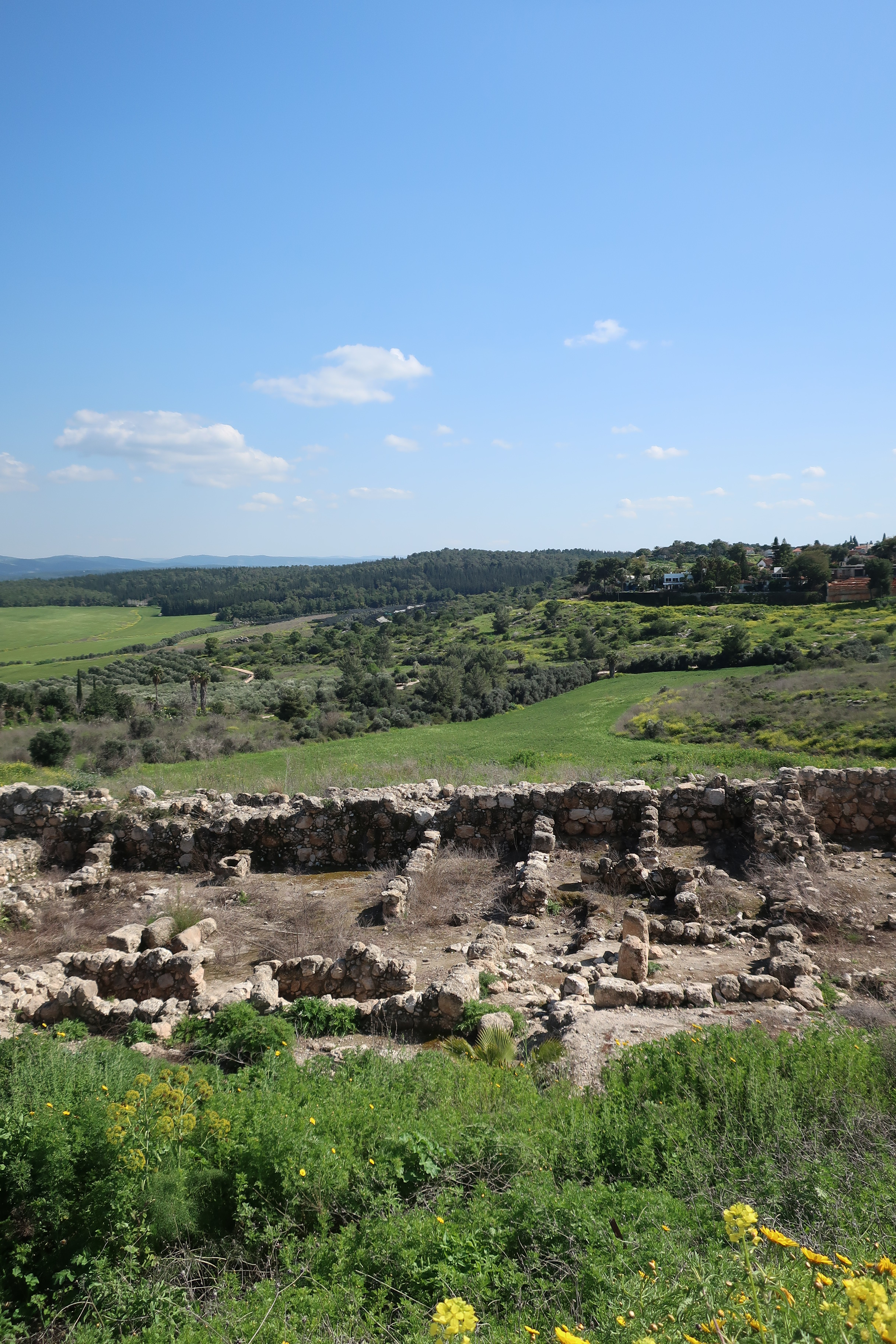
Excavations at Tel Gezer

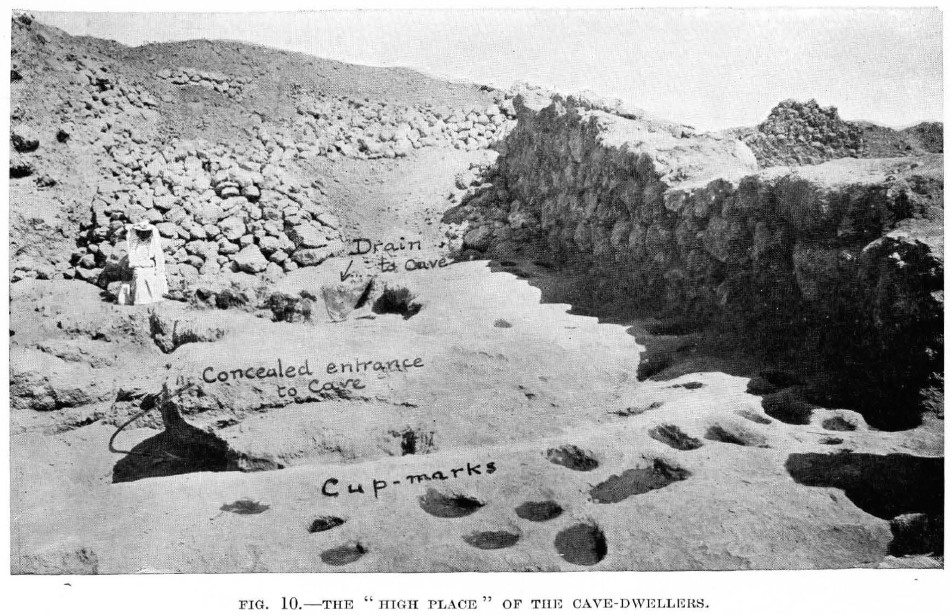
High place with "cup holders", cave mouth

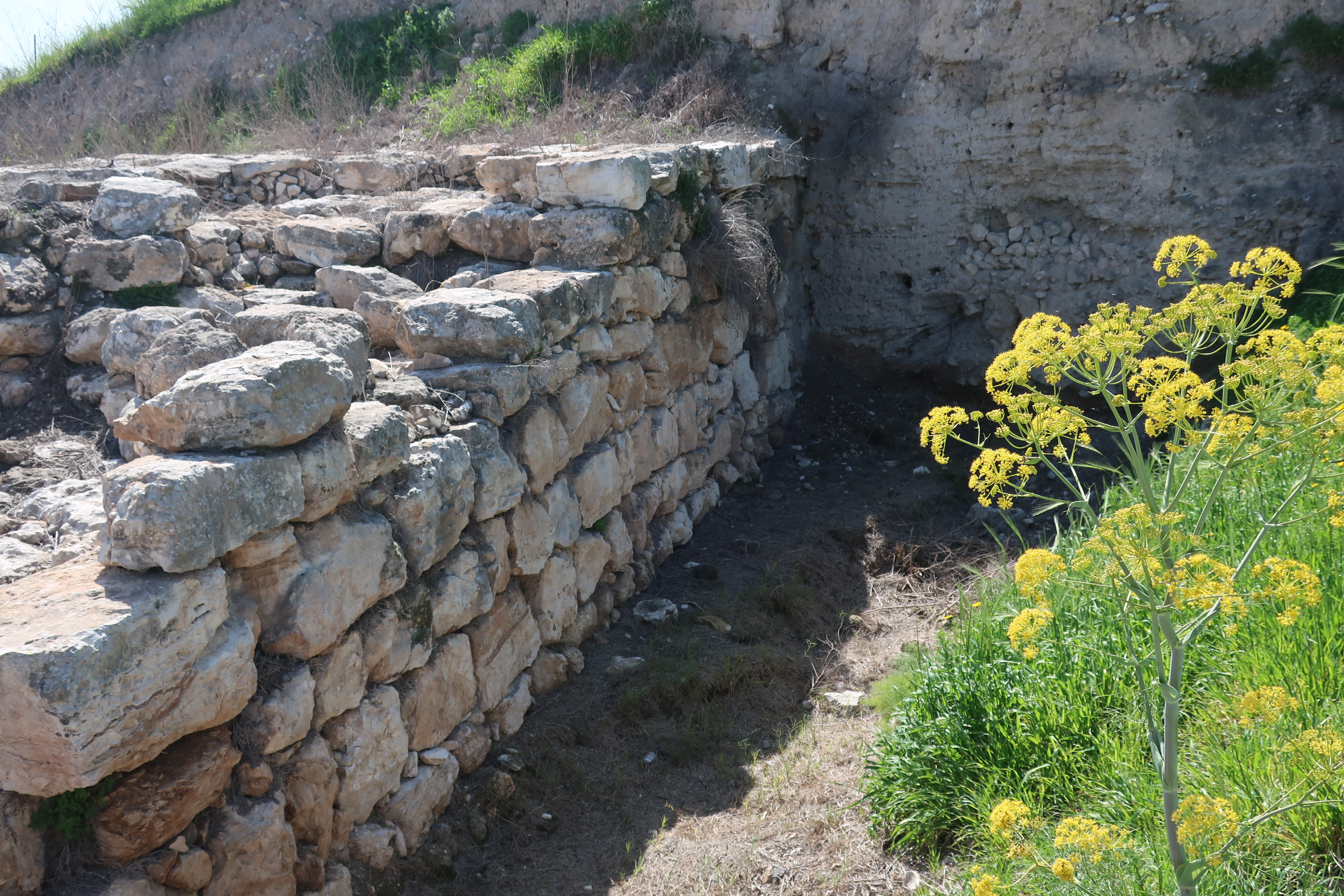
Courses of stone in old tower at Gezer

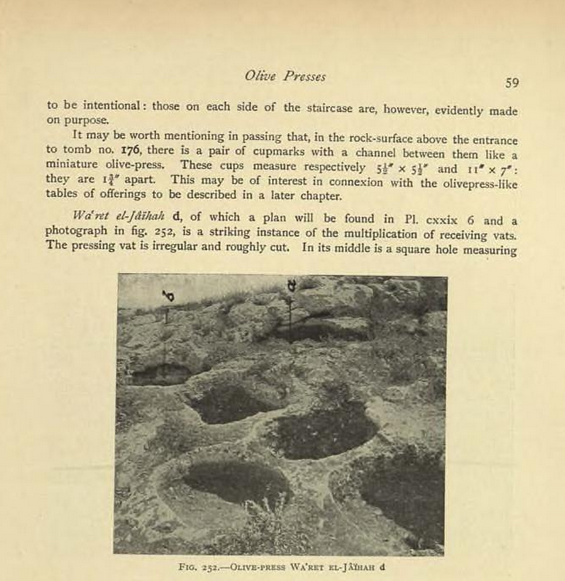
recessed olive presses look similar to the cup holders at the same site, in a polka dot pattern

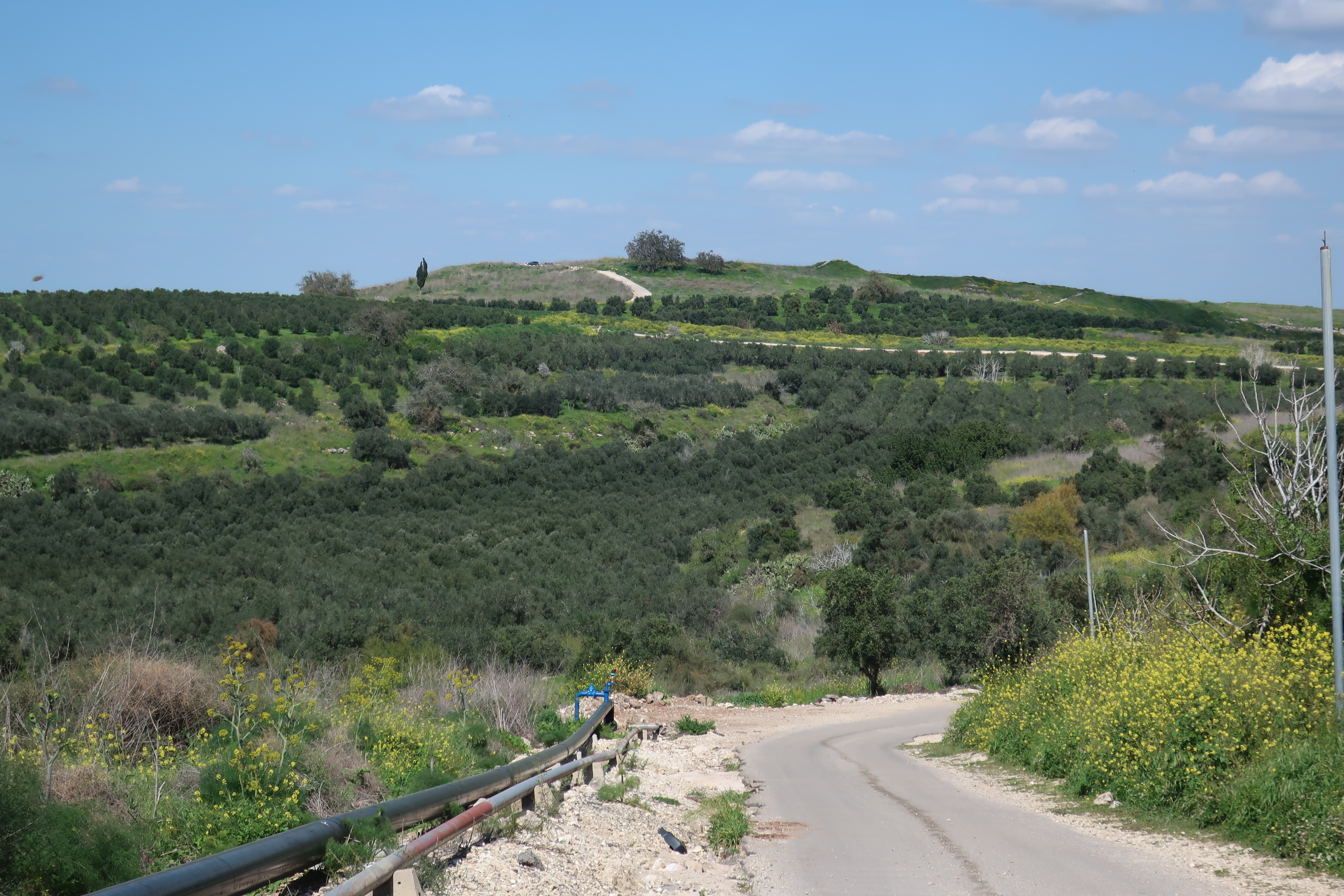
Approach to Tel Gezer (seen in distance)

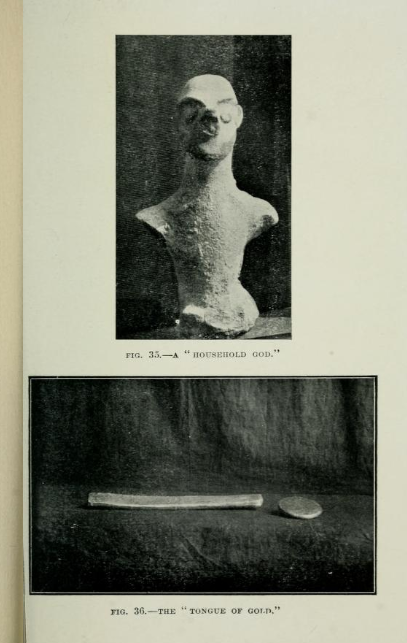
Figurine discovered at Gezer.

== National Park and conservation ==
The Israel Nature and Parks Authority (INPA) oversees Tel Gezer National Park, which protects the archeological site.

=== Preservation initiatives ===
The Israel Antiquities Authority (IAA) and INPA carry out stabilization projects, like strengthening the 3,500-year-old Canaanite gate, to prevent erosion, vandalism, and fire damage to ancient mudbrick and stone structures. They also engage public volunteers in the production of traditional protective bricks to strengthen the site's fortifications.

== See also ==
- Cities of the ancient Near East
- Archaeology of Israel
