= Thebes (Ionia) =

Port town of ancient Ionia

Coordinates: 37°38′04″N 27°08′38″E

Thebes or Thebae or Thebai (Ancient Greek: Θῆβαι) was a port town of ancient Ionia, under the Mycale mountains.

Its site is located west of Doğanbey, Asiatic Turkey.
