= Gadara (disambiguation) =

Gadara was an ancient Hellenistic city in what is now Umm Qais, Jordan.

Gadara may also refer to following cities from the Southern Levant:

- Gadara or Gadora of Peraea, ancient city identified with Tell el-Jadur near Salt, Jordan
- Gezer (not consensual), ancient city in the Judaean foothills, Israel, possibly graecised to Gadara (in Loeb edition of Josephus amended to Gazara)

== See also ==
- Gadarene (disambiguation)
- GDRT, vocalised by historians as Gadarat, king of Aksum (c. 200 CE)
