= Shousha =

Shousha or Shusha is a surname. It may refer to:

- Aly Tewfik Shousha (1891-1964), Egyptian physician
- Antoine Shousha (born 1927), Egyptian sports shooter
- Farouk Shousha (1936–2016), Egyptian poet
- Youssef Shousha (born 1993), Egyptian basketball player

== See also ==
- Shusha (disambiguation)
- Shusha, a city in the disputed region of Nagorno-Karabakh in the South Caucasus
- Abu Shusha, Palestinian Arab village in the Ramle Subdistrict of Mandatory Palestine, located 8 km southeast of Ramle. It was depopulated in May 1948.
