= Wadi al-Hujeir =

Valley in Lebanon

Coordinates: 33°18′28″N 35°26′19″E

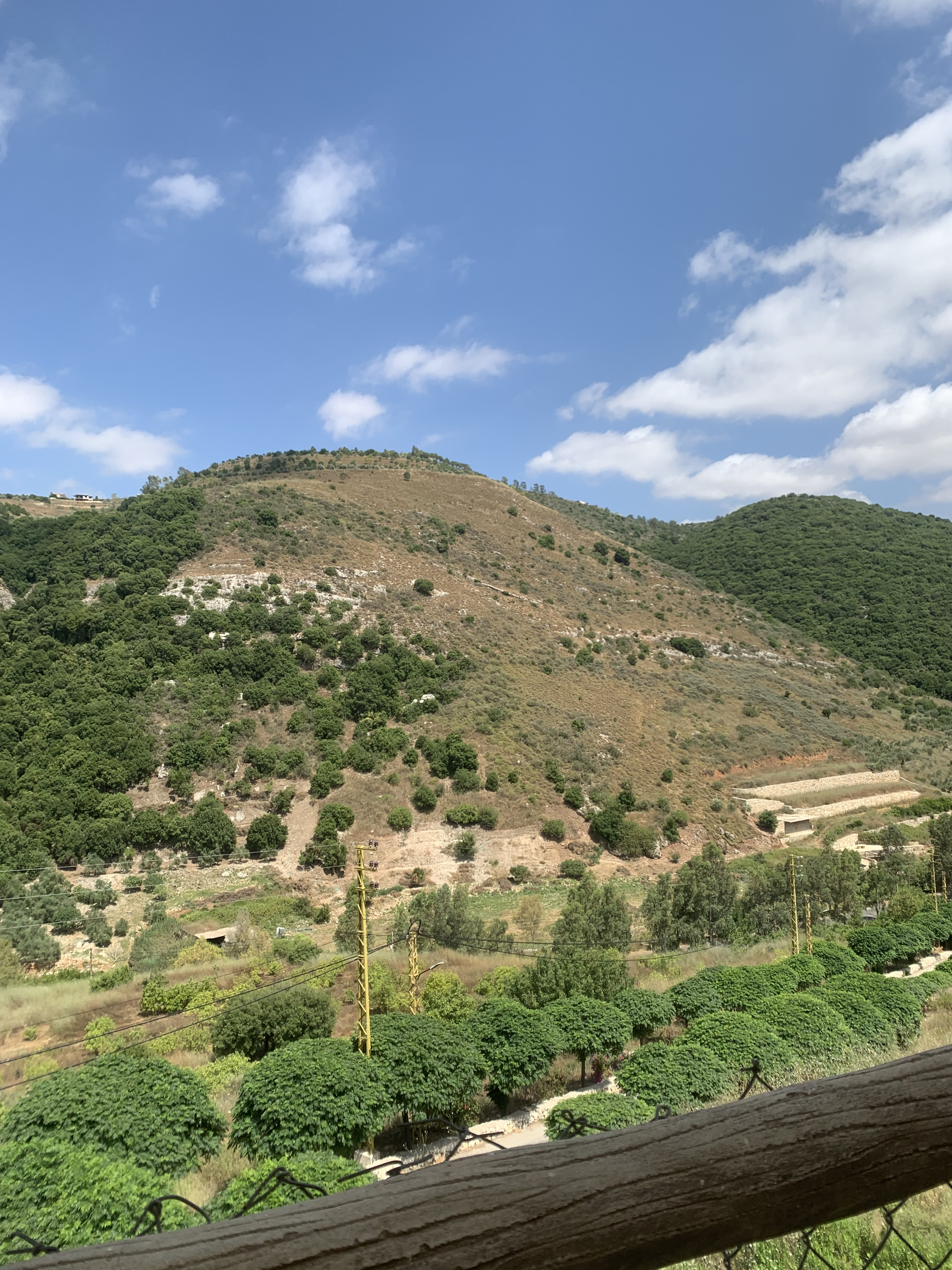
- Part of Wadi al-Hujeir as seen from Ghanduriyah, Bint Jbeil in 2023
- Area: 26 km^{2} (10 mi^{2})

Naming
- Native name: وادي الحجير (Arabic)

Geography
- Country: Lebanon
- Interactive map of Wadi al-Hujeir

Wadi al-Hujeir (Arabic: وادي الحجير) is a valley and nature reserve in Jabal Amil, across the Nabatieh, Bint Jbeil and Marjeyoun districts of Southern Lebanon.

The valley holds a strategic value in the Israeli–Lebanese conflict. In the 2006 war, it was labeled the "Merkava graveyard", as Hezbollah destroyed 39 Israeli tanks in the area.

Wadi al-Hujeir was announced a nature reserve by law in 2010, over an area of 26 km^{2}. It is characterized by the presence of ancient olive trees, with some as old as 300 years, Valonia oak forests, as well as an emerging carob plantation.

== History ==
=== 1920 conference ===
In the wake of the French occupation of Lebanon and Syria in 1920, a conference of anti-French revolutionaries, led by Abd al-Husayn Sharaf al-Din, was held in Wadi al-Hujeir. The conference called for resistance against the French colonial forces and participation in the Arab Revolt. Sharaf al-Din also emphasized the importance of unity and respect between Christians and Muslims.

=== Israel–Hezbollah conflict ===
In the final days of the 2006 war, a battle was fought across the Saluki stream and Wadi al-Hujeir, as part of Operation Change of Direction 11. Hezbollah halted the advance of Israeli troops towards the Litani river. The IDF suffered 33 deaths, several dozens of injured soldiers in addition to the destruction of several Merkava tanks.
