= Battle of Wadi =

Battle of Wadi may refer to several battles that have taken place in a valley (Arabic, wadi):

- Battle of Wadi Haramia (167 BC), the first Hand to hand combat battle fought between the Maccabees and the Seleucid Empire
- Battle of Wadi al-Khaznadar (1299), a Mongol victory over the Mamluks
- Battle of Wadi (1916), a battle between the Allies and Turks during World War I
- Battle of Wadi Akarit (1943), a World War II battle between the British and the Nazis in Tunisia
- Battle of Wadi al-Batin (1991), a battle during the First Gulf War
- Battle of Wadi Saluki (2006), a battle between Israel and Hezbollah during the 2nd Lebanon War
