= Yeled =

Yeled ילד
- Born: Omer Yefet; 7 June 2000 (age 26); Beit Hashmonai
- Genres: Pop
- Occupations: singer; songwriter; record producer
- Years active: 2022–present

Omer Yefet (Hebrew: עומר יפת; born June 7, 2000), known by his stage name Yeled (Hebrew: ילד, lit. 'child'), is an Israeli singer-songwriter. He first became known in 2022 after participating in the singing competition "The Next Star." He gained more recognition in 2024, when he released "למה את?", which gained popularity on social media and received chart success.

== Biography ==
Yeled was born on June 7, 2000, and grew up in the settlement of Beit Hashmonai. In August of 2022, he participated in the reality show "The Next Star." Yeled performed the song "Haor Bachay" from the album "Our Song" in the audition and won 92% of the votes from the audience and judges. During the show, he also performed original songs, including "Ain Derech HaKhetra", which he later officially released. Yeled was eliminated in the quarter-finals of the show.

"Give Me a Reason", the first single from his debut album, was released in July 2023.

In April 2024, Yeled reset his social media accounts and adopted the stage name Yeled. That same month, he released the second single from the album, "Lama At?", which he had previously revealed in videos he uploaded to TikTok. The song also reached number 10 on the Mako Hitlist chart. The song also entered the Media Forest chart and the Galgalatz chart. His self-titled debut album was released on June 17, 2024.

On May 21, 2025, Yeled announced the release of the album "Ahava Aheret" via an Instagram post, in which he also revealed his partner, Noam Goldstein, who took the album cover photo. To mark the album launch, a performance was planned at the Barbie Club in Tel Aviv on July 2, 2025. The album's title track was titled "Love Another".

== Discography ==
=== Albums ===
- ילד (2024)
- אהבה אחרת (2025)
