= Battle of Ayta ash-Sha'b =

Battle during the 2006 Lebanon War

Coordinates: 33°05′50″N 35°20′04″E

- Part of 2006 Lebanon War
Date	12 July – 14 August 2006
Location	Ayta ash-Sha'b, Southern Lebanon
Result	Hezbollah victory: Israel failed to capture the town

Belligerents
Israel Defense Forces	Hezbollah

Commanders and leaders
Brig.-Gen. Udi Adam, head of Northern Command; Brig.-Gen. Gal Hirsch, commander of the 91st Div. Col. Ilan Atias, commander of 2nd Brigade; Col. Hagai Mordechai, commander of 35th Brigade	Unknown

Units involved
35th Paratroopers Brigade: 101st battalion; 890th battalion; 84th Nahal Brigade; 2nd Infantry Reserve Brigade (Carmeli); 847th Armored Reserve Brigade; 551st Paratrooper Reserve Brigade: 8219th Engineering Battalion	60–70 fighters (Israeli estimate); 100 fighters (Lebanese estimate)

Casualties and losses
28 killed (IDF claim); 200 killed and wounded (Hezbollah claim)	around 10 fighters killed (Lebanese and international media estimates); 40 killed (IDF claim); 2 captured
- 8 Lebanese civilians killed (Lebanese sources)

The Battle of Ayta ash-Sha'b took place during the 2006 Lebanon War, when the Israel Defense Forces and the Islamic Resistance, the armed wing of Hezbollah, fought over the town of Ayta ash-Sha'b in southern Lebanon. The fighting started with the 2006 Hezbollah cross-border raid. After a failed Israeli incursion immediately after the cross-border raid, the town was subjected to two and a half weeks of intense bombardment by air and artillery. The ground battle for the Ayta ash-Sha'b lasted about two weeks, from late July to mid-August. The IDF deployed five brigades. The Hezbollah force in the town was estimated to consist of little more than half a company. Still the IDF failed to capture the town and suffered relatively heavy casualties in the process.

== Background ==
On 12 July 2006, under the cover of mortar and rocket fire directed at Israeli communities and IDF positions, forces belonging to the Islamic Resistance launched a cross-border raid into Israeli territory, killing three Israeli soldiers and abducting two, Ehud Goldwasser and Eldad Regev. The abductors apparently headed for the town of Ayta ash-Sha'b, less than a kilometer from the site of the abduction.

Nir Rosen writes that Ayta ash-Sha'b was defended by approximately 100 fighters, mainly local inhabitants. Some of the defenders of the town were not members of the Islamic Resistance or even of Hezbollah. According to Andrew Exum, the majority of the fighters were not "regular Hezbollah fighters". Blanford agrees that most of the fighters were local residents, but that they were "no second-rate home guard. They were battle-hardened veterans,… many of them with specialist training in anti-armor missiles and sniping." According to a study supported by Israeli authorities, Hezbollah's military infrastructure in the village consisted of 60–70 Hezbollah operatives.

== The Battle ==
Ayta ash-Sha'b, other Lebanese border villages, and Hezbollah outposts were immediately subjected to bombardment from aircraft, artillery, and attack helicopters supporting Israeli ground forces. This would continue almost daily throughout the war. On the first day the IDF declared, somewhat optimistically, that "all Hezbollah outposts along the border were destroyed."

=== First attempted incursion ===
Less than two hours after the capture of the two soldiers, the IDF sent a force of tanks and armored personnel carriers across the border following a dirt track, through an olive grove called Khallat Warda, leading to Ayta ash-Sha'b. The force was ordered to capture a Hezbollah post and to take control of the exit roads from the town, in case the abducted soldiers were still there. Only 70 meters into Lebanese territory, a Merkava heavy battle tank drove over a remote-controlled mine. The tank was destroyed and its four crewmen were killed instantly, and the mission to capture the access roads to the town was quickly abandoned. Hezbollah fire prevented the extraction of the destroyed tank and the remains of the four soldiers just inside Lebanese territory for several days. A fifth soldier was killed and two soldiers wounded in the effort. Defence Minister Amir Peretz, who watched the tank exploding live on his monitor, was stunned. It was later described as the "Zidane effect" that cemented Israel's resolve towards going to war.

=== Shelling and displacement of the population ===
On the evening of 12 July, IDF Northern Command contemplated sending paratroopers to Ayta ash-Sha'b "to conduct arrests". This was postponed because of a lack of intelligence. During the first week the fighting was limited to exchanges of fire over the border. The original Israeli plan deemed it unnecessary to occupy Lebanese territory to rid the border of Hezbollah.

Israel started shelling Ayta ash-Sha'b about an hour after the cross-border raid. Around 03.00 the following morning 13/7 the Israeli Air Force started attacking ground targets in south Lebanon. A few hours later Hizbullah retaliated by firing off rockets at targets in northern Israel. Within one hour, Israel suffered its first civilian fatality.

The IDF used the air force, both aircraft and attack helicopters, and artillery fire. The Lebanese fighters fired rockets, guided missiles, mortars, Katyusha rockets and heavy machine guns at Israeli towns and IDF positions.

The headquarters of the 91st Division at Biranit just across the border from Ayta ash-Sha'b was subjected to a "hard and extremely accurate" attack by Katyusha rockets. The Command bunker received a direct hit destroying the generator and cutting off light and air supply to the facility. Only the dim lights of cell phones could be seen when terrified Israeli soldiers called home. According to Islamic Resistance commanders the fighters suffered no casualties during this period.

According to Yedioth Ahronoth more than 300 rockets were fired from the area of Ayta ash-Sha'ab during the war. According to an IDF sponsored study, however, IDF radar detected 156 rockets being launched from inside villages throughout South Lebanon during the war, but none from Ayta ash-Sha'b.

According to Lebanese sources Hezbullah did not have artillery or rocket firing positions inside the town but used "Nature Reserves", well-entrenched positions in the country-side, to shell IDF positions and Israeli civilian settlements.

The IDF artillery used the Nurit Radar detection system for identifying the location of incoming rockets and mortars, and rapidly fire back at the source of fire. This action had no noticeable effect on the rate of Hezbullah firing. Towards the end of the war IDF understood that the firing positions in the "Nature Reserves" were covered in bunkers with metal hatches and the launchers were only exposed at the time of firing.

On 14 July the IDF launched operation "Salvation to the South" to encourage the evacuation of the civilian population in the border villages, among them Ayta ash-Sha'b.

The civilian inhabitants of the town were warned through loudspeakers, leaflets and radio messages to evacuate the town. To prove their point, IDF artillery units would fire a number of explosive shells at areas a few hundred meters from built-up areas. If the calls were not heeded, then another number of shells were fired at the villages' fringes. If this didn't help non-explosive grenades (smoke or lightening grenades) were fired into the center of villages.

The great majority of the population of Ayta ash-Sha'b therefore left the town. Some civilians stayed put for a variety of reasons. Some had no means of transport or could not afford to rent such. Others stayed on principle, refusing to be expelled from their homes. Yet others stayed to help the fighters, by cooking food for them or tending to the wounded.

=== Second attempted incursion ===
About a week into the war the IDF resumed ground operations around Ayta ash-Sha'b, with nightly incursions by foot, mainly around the Old Quarter in the west and the northern sections of the town, such as the Abu Tawil hill. These incursions were described by Arkin as "probes" and probably served mainly to gather intelligence.

On the 19th, Northern Command launched Operation Webs of Steel 1, a simultaneous attack on the border villages of Maroun ar-Ras, Marwahin and Ayta ash-Sha'b. A unit of Paratroopers infiltrated northern Ayta ash-Sha'b, with orders to attack suspected weapons caches. The unit was detected by Hezbullah and a clash ensued. One IDF soldier was seriously wounded and had to be evacuated by helicopter.

Meanwhile, the attack on Maroun ar-Ras failed and led to a number of IDF casualties. The forces about to attack Ayta ash-Sha'b were called back and were redirected as reinforcements to Maroun ar-Ras.

=== Decision to create a Security Zone ===
Two weeks into the war it was clear that the Israeli strategy was not working. In late July the Israeli cabinet therefore approved "Operation Web of Steel 3" (later renamed Operation Change of Direction 8), designed to take control of a "security zone", 6–8 kilometers wide, along the border. Reserves were called up and eight brigades amassed on the Israeli-Lebanese border.

On 31 July Israeli paratroopers effectively surrounded Ayta ash-Sha'b with the intention of driving out Hezbollah. They were met with fierce resistance. On the next day they advanced on the town from two directions. One company-sized unit was advancing into the eastern Abu Laban quarter. The troops were discovered by Hezbollah forces, which after several hours of fighting forced the Israelis to retreat. During this fight Hezbollah suffered its first fatality, Younis Surour. The other force, the 890th Paratrooper Battalion, attacked the Old Town from the north and advanced towards the Imam Hussein mosque. The battalion came under fire, and its forces got separated as they took cover. Israeli soldiers were shocked by the ferocity of the fire and several stopped functioning. The attack was aborted and reinforcements were called in to extract dead, wounded and shell-shocked soldiers. According to Hezbollah, another Lebanese fighter, Hisham as-Sayyid, was killed while pursuing the retreating Israelis. Three Israeli soldiers, including an officer, were killed and at least 25 were wounded. The IDF claimed that 15 Hezbollah guerrillas had been killed in the clash, though Hezbollah claimed it only lost two fighters. Israeli injured had to be carried by their comrades, under Hezbollah fire, back to the Israeli border. It took the wounded a whole day to reach the hospital in Nahariya. The Paratroopers were originally supposed to move north the following day but because of the casualties sustained, they were ordered to remain in the vicinity of the town.

Defense Minister Amir Peretz expressed his growing frustration at the slow progress IDF was making to his senior officers: "It's infuriating – we're circling Ayta al-Shaab for the third time already."

=== Continued street fighting ===
On 2 August, "harsh battles" were reported inside the town. One Israeli paratrooper was reported killed and nine wounded. On the same day, an Israeli force surrounded a house in the northern Abu Tawil section of the town. When the house was searched, two Hezbollah fighters hiding in the house were discovered and taken prisoner.

Israeli media reports were still upbeat and reported that the IDF "during the day" [sic] was "set to complete its deployment" in a 5–6 kilometers wide "security zone" along the Lebanese border, all the way between Metula and Rosh HaNikra. Ayta ash-Sha'b, less than a kilometer from the border, was going to prove a much more difficult nut to crack than expected.

The Hezbollah fighters generally fought from well-protected positions. A Hezbollah fighter told Lebanese daily as-Safir after the war how close the Israeli soldiers and Hezbollah guerrillas were, sometimes separated only by an alley or a destroyed house. The first time he saw Israeli soldiers he could not believe his eyes: "They were so close that sometimes our units would overlap theirs". The Israeli soldiers would advance into a neighborhood and seek cover in a building when exposed to fire. The fighters would then target the building with remote-controlled missiles or rocket-propelled grenades. Most of the casualties sustained by the IDF were caused by rockets or missiles. When Israeli forces retreated the fighters would generally take cover in tunnels or shelters to avoid the shelling or bombardment from the air that would usually follow. When the shelling stopped the fighters would emerge to face the expected Israeli advance. In one case, three Hezbollah fighters took cover in a shelter during an air raid. The shelter received a direct hit and collapsed, killing them. Their bodies could not be recovered for 10 days. Another Hezbollah fighter also became one of the first Lebanese killed by a drone strike during the war.

In spite of the substantial losses, IDF officials denied that there was any intention of withdrawing from the village, without "a clear surrender" of Hezbollah, because it was major stronghold and considered a "symbol of the determination" of the movement.

On 5 August, a soldier from the Carmeli brigade was killed and several others wounded by a missile. The Brigade commander then decided to withdraw, abandoning all the positions previously captured in the town by both the Carmeli Brigade and by the Paratroopers. He was heavily criticised for this decision after the war.

On 6 August, the Defense Minister again expressed his dissatisfaction over the army's inability to conquer Ayta ash-Sha'b. The orders to the IDF to quickly occupy Ayta ash-Sha'b were repeated several times over the coming days. A negotiating team that had been sent to the town to negotiate a peaceful surrender of its defenders returned empty handed on 7 August.

On 10 August, the IDF claimed to have killed three Hezbollah fighters in Ayta ash-Sha'b.

=== Fighting spreads to Dibil and al-Qawzah ===
Israeli forces eventually bypassed Ayta ash-Sha'b and started pushing northward towards the villages of al-Qawzah and Dibil, a few kilometers to the north of the town. Both of the villages were Christian and Hezbollah probably maintained a minimal presence there. The front line was thereby "extended from ash-Shomera–Zar’it [in Israel], over Khallat Warda [near the border] and reaching al-Qawzah and Dibil”.

On 7 August, a joint force of PUMA APCs and D-9 bulldozers attempted a break through from al-Qawzah to Dibil. On the way back, the force was attacked by a barrage of missiles. One of the PUMAs was severely hit and one soldier was killed and five others wounded.

9 August, a large IDF force was detected by Hezbollah scouts while advancing from al-Qawzah towards Dibil. Local headquarters were alerted and the Israeli force was subjected to artillery and mortar fire, near the Dibil public swimming pool, from positions outside Ayta ash-Sha'b. Hezbollah did not maintain artillery inside the town. An Israeli unit, belonging to the 8219th Engineering Battalion of the 551st Paratrooper Reserve Brigade, took cover in a garage on the outskirts of Dibil. The house was hit by two anti-tank missiles fired from Ayta ash-Sha'b (about 4 kilometers away) and the building collapsed. Nine soldiers were killed and 31 wounded, many of whom were buried under the ruins. Among those killed were Major Natan Yahav, the only senior IDF officer to die in the battle of Ayta ash-Sha'b. The incident was dubbed "The House of Death". Survivors later expressed bitterness at the IDF command, whose "incompetence and stupidity" contributed to the high number of casualties. "In Debel, those nine guys never even had a chance to shoot a single bullet." The casualties had to be carried on stretchers back to Israel.

The same day, a Merkava tank was hit by a missile, fired from close range in Ayta ash-Sha'b. The tank turret was blown off and the tank caught fire. Its four crewmen were killed instantly.

On 9 August, General Eizenkot had to inform the government that the army had failed to capture Ayta ash-Sha'b. Prime Minister Ehud Olmert demanded an explanation.

Less than three days before the ceasefire, Operation Changing Direction 11 was launched with the aim of pushing further into Lebanese territory. 17 Israeli soldiers died in the fighting around the villages of Haddatha, Yatar, at-Tiri, Rashaf and Ayta az-Zut, well to the north of Ayta ash-Sha'b. There are no reports of any offensive Israeli action against Hezbollah positions in the town itself.

On the last day of the fighting, an IDF infantry force at the Abu Tawil hill in the northern outskirts of the town was hit by an anti-tank missile. Four soldiers were killed and 20 wounded.

By the time the cease-fire took effect on the morning of 14 August, the IDF apparently had abandoned all its positions inside Ayta a-Sha'b. Blanford notes: "On the first day of the ceasefire, it was possible to reach [Aita ash-Sha'b]… which lay behind the IDF's frontline positions in Haddatha, Rashaf and Yatar without even seeing a single IDF soldier." A camera team from al-Jazeera reached the village and interviewed a Hezbollah fighter a few hours after the ceasefire took effect.

== Aftermath ==
The Israeli army never occupied Ayta ash-Sha'b. According to Harel and Issacharoff, the town became "a symbol of Israel's performance in the war, the village where it all began, where the IDF thrashed about for four weeks and never succeeded in taking." Exum described Hezbollah's "tenacity" in the defense of the border villages as "the biggest surprise of the war" and the performance of the village units as "exceptional".

The Carmeli Brigade pulled a battalion out of the town, after one of its soldiers was killed, in what was described as a "tactical retreat". The performance of the Carmeli Brigade was afterwards singled out (together with another unit, the 366th Division) for particular harsh criticism. It displayed a "lack of determination, an unnecessary retreat and a misunderstanding of the bigger picture. Much of the blame was placed on the top brass, but the [two] brigades were left thoroughly shaken by the war." After the war a committee, headed by Col. (res) Yoram Yair, sharply criticized the conduct of 91st Division during the war, including the battle of Ayta ash-Sha'b. The battle was called "the black hole of the war".

Brig.-Gen. Gal Hirsch, the commanding officer under which the Carmeli Brigade served during the war, was fired a few months after the war.

The commander of the Northern Command, Gen. Udi Adam, was practically fired already on 8 Aug, after the repeated failures to capture Bint Jbeil and Ayta ash-Sha'b. Chief of Staff Halutz sent his deputy, Maj.-Gen. Moshe Kaplinsky, to Northern Command, to serve as his "coordinator" beside Adam. Adam formally resigned from the army in September. Chief of Staff Dan Halutz himself resigned in January 2007.

Veteran Israeli war correspondent Ron Ben-Yishai claimed that the problem was not limited to the commanding officers. He claimed that a "crybaby culture" had developed among the soldiers of the Israeli army. Almost every Israeli offensive operation in the war, including those in Ayta ash-Sha'b, were called off as soon as resistance was encountered and casualties were sustained, even though IDF in almost every clash enjoyed superiority, both in terms of numbers and firepower. Soldiers often abandoned their missions and focused all efforts on evacuating casualties from the battlefield rather than continuing to pursue their objectives.

Gilad Sharon asked in a column in Yedioth Ahronoth after the war: "How could it be that after a month of war, our soldiers were still being wounded among the still-standing houses of the village of Aita al-Shaab, literately [sic] hundreds of meters from the location of the abduction that sparked the war?"

== Casualties ==
The Municipality of Ayta ash-Sha’b published a casualty list that included the names of 11 Hezbollah fighters who were killed in the battle of Ayta ash-Sha’b. Eight of these were locals and three were from other localities in Lebanon. Another eleven named fighters were wounded. The town also suffered eight "civilian martyrs". These Hezbollah casualties were largely confirmed by other sources: Journalist Simon Assaf (eight locals), The Washington Post (eight locals), Nir Rosen and Hannah Alam of McClatchy (nine locals) and Israeli newspaper Yedioth Ahronoth ("around ten" residents, "in addition to other fighters who arrived").

Ayta ash-Sha'b resident Commander Muhammad Wahbi Surour was also named a "martyr of Ayta", but he was killed in an airstrike near the village of Barish further to the north. He was a logistics officer and one of the three highest ranked Hezbollah commanders to die in the war.

The IDF, on the other hand, claimed that 40 Hezbollah guerrillas were killed in the battle.

Two Hezbollah fighters were taken prisoner by the IDF during the battle of Ayta ash-Sha'b. The captured fighters were not recognized as prisoners-of-war. In September 2006 the two prisoners were put on trial, together with a third prisoner, Mahir Kourani, who was captured a few days later at the village of Shihin. The three were accused of a long series of criminal offenses, including "providing service to an illegal association," "weapons training in Iran and Lebanon without government permission," "conspiracy to commit a crime," and "conspiracy to commit murder" as well as participation in the kidnapping and attempted kidnapping of Israeli soldiers. Before the trial was concluded the three prisoners (including the fourth prisoner, Khadr Zaidan, who was captured at al-Ghandouriya) were released in the 2008 prisoner exchange.

According to a spokesman for the U.N. High Commissioner for Refugees, only 100 of the 1300 houses in the town remained after the war. In spite of the widespread destruction in Ayta ash-Sha'b, there were surprisingly few civilian casualties. According to Lebanese sources only eight civilian residents were killed in the war. The main reason for this seems to have been that the great majority of the civilian population had been evacuated from the town early in the conflict. According to a Human Rights Watch report two of the civilian fatalities were actually killed outside the town. On 19 July Zaynab Salah Jawad, aged 7, and her sister Kawthar, 4, were killed when a 155 mm artillery shell struck the private home in the nearby Christian village of Rumaysh, where the family had sought refuge after being evacuated from Ayta ash-Sha'b. One man was killed 20 July by a missile fired by a helicopter. An elderly couple and their son in his forties were killed the day after when their home was destroyed by an air strike.

28 Israeli soldiers, five of them officers, were killed in 33 days of fighting in and around Áyta ash-Sha'b. Five of them died in the ill-fated rescue attempt at the border on 12 July and another ten were killed in the nearby village of Dibil.

=== Islamic Resistance fatalities ===
The Municipality of Ayta ash-Sha’b published the following casualty list.

==== Fighters from Ayta ash-Sha’b ====
- al-Sayyid Yousuf Muhammad as-Sayyid
- Muhammad Ni’ma Rida
- Muhammad Kamal Surour
- Younis Ya’qoub Surour
- Shadi Hani Sa’d
- Muhammad Mousa Surour
- Wajeeh Muhammad Tuhaini
- al-Sayyid Hisham Muhsin Murtada

==== Fighters from other Lebanese localities ====
- Hassan Qa’iq
- Ali Abdul-Muhsin Khalil
- Hasan Muhammad Muhsin

==== Fighters from Ayta ash-Sha’b killed in other battles of 2006 war ====
- Commander Muhammad Wahbi Surour

=== Islamic Resistance prisoners-of-war ===
- Muhammad Surour
- Hussein Suleiman (captured in Ayta but a resident of Beirut)

=== Lebanese civilian fatalities ===
- Hajj Rida Rida
- Hajja Haniya Surour
- Hajj Ahmad Rida
- Ahmad Abdul-Nabi
- Hajj Hassan Rida
- Ali Hassan Daqdouq
- Kawthar Salah Jawad (killed in Rumaysh)
- Zaynab Salah Jawad (killed in Rumaysh)

=== Israeli fatalities ===
12 July 2006 (Khallat Warda / Ayta ash-Sha'b)

- Staff-Sergeant Alexei Kushnirski (tank commander, 82nd Bat. of the 7th Brigade), 21, of Ness Ziona
- Staff-Sergeant Yaniv Bar-on (2nd Bat. of the 7th Brigade), 20, of Maccabim
- Sergeant Gadi Mosayev (2nd Bat. of the 7th Brigade), 20, of Akko
- Sergeant Shlomi Yirmiyahu (2nd Bat. of the 7th Brigade), 20, of Rishon LeZion
- Sergeant Nimrod Cohen (Nahal Brigade), 19, of Mitzpe Shalem

1 August 2006 (Ayta ash-Sha'b)

- Lieutenant Ilan Gabai (Paratroopers 101 Bat.), 21, of Kiryat Tivon
- Staff-Sergeant Yonatan Einhorn (Paratroopers 101 Bat.), 22, of Moshav Gimzo
- Staff-Sergeant Michael Levin (Paratroopers 890 Bat.), 21, of Jerusalem

2 August 2006 (Ayta ash-Sha'b)

- Sergeant Adi Cohen (Paratrooper 101 Bat.), 18, of Hadera

5 August 2006 (Ayta ash-Sha'b)

- Corporal (res.) Kiril Kashdan (Carmeli brigade), 26, of Haifa

7 August 2006 (Dibil)

- Staff-Sergeant Philip Mosko (Paratroopers 101 Bat.), 21

9 August 2006 (Ayta ash-Sha'b)

- Captain (res.) Gilad Stukelman (847th reserve brigade), 26, of Moshav Timrat
- Sergeant-Major.(res.) Noam Goldman (847th reserve brigade), 27, of Tel Aviv
- Staff-Sergeant (res.) Nir Cohen (847th reserve brigade), 22, of Maccabim
- Staff-Sergeant (res.) Ben (Binyamin) Sela (847th reserve brigade), 24, of Koranit

9 August 2006 (Dibil)

- Major (res.) Natan Yahav (551st Paratrooper Brigade), 36, of Kiryat Ono
- Captain (res.) Yoni (Leon) Shmucher (551st Paratrooper Brigade), 30, of Bet Nehemia
- Sergeant-Major (res.) Asher Reuven Novik (551st Paratrooper Brigade), 36, of Kanaf
- Staff-Sergeant Adi Salim (551st Paratrooper Brigade), 22, of Beit Hashmonai
- Sergeant-Major (res.) Elad Dan (551st Paratrooper Brigade), 25, of Kibbutz Eilot
- Sergeant-Major (res.) Gilad Zussman (551st Paratrooper Brigade), 26, of Eli
- Sergeant-Major (res.) Idan Kobi (551st Paratrooper Brigade), 26, of Eilat
- Sergeant-Major (res.) Naor Kalo (551st Paratrooper Brigade), 25, of Kibbutz Maagan Michael
- Sergeant-Major (res.) Nimrod Segev (551st Paratrooper Brigade), 28, of Ramat Gan

13 August 2006 (Abu Tawil / Ayta ash-Sha'b)

- Lieutenant (res.) Eliel Ben-Yehuda (Carmeli brigade), 24, of Kfar Tavor
- Sergeant-Major (res.) Guy Hasson (Carmeli brigade), 24, of Moshav Na'omi
- Staff-Sergeant (res.) Yaniv Shainbrum (Carmeli brigade), 24, of Mei Ami
- Staff-Sergeant (res.) Elad Shlomo Ram (Carmeli brigade), 31, of Haifa

== Bibliography ==
- Arkin, William M. (July 2007). "Divining Victory: Airpower in the 2006 Israel-Hezbollah War" (PDF). Maxwell Air Force Base, Alabama: Air University Press.
- Biddle, Stephen and Jeffrey A. Friedman, "THE 2006 LEBANON CAMPAIGN AND THE FUTURE OF WARFARE: IMPLICATIONS FOR ARMY AND DEFENSE POLICY", Strategic Studies Institute, U.S. Army War College, September 2008
- Blanford, Nicholas, "HIZBULLAH AND THE IDF: ACCEPTING NEW REALITIES ALONG THE BLUE LINE" in THE SIXTH WAR ISRAEL’S INVASION OF LEBANON, The MIT Electronic Journal of Middle East Studies Vol. 6, Summer 2006
- Crooke, Alastair and Mark Perry, HOW HEZBOLLAH DEFEATED ISRAEL, Asia Times

PART 1: Winning the intelligence war, 12 October 2006
PART 2: Winning the ground war, 13 October 2006
PART 3: The political war, 14 October 2006

- Ehrlich, Dr. Reuven (Col. Ret.) (November 2006). "Hezbollah's use of Lebanese civilians as human shields". Intelligence and Terrorism Information Center at the Center for Special Studies (C.S.S). Archived from the original on 25 January 2012. [The study was supported by Military Intelligence, the Operations Division of the IDF General Staff, the IDF Spokesperson and the legal experts of the IDF and the Ministry of Foreign Affairs.]
- Exum, Andrew, "Hizballah at War – A Military Assessment", Washington Institute for Near East Policy, Policy Focus No. 63 | December 2006
- Harel, Amos; Issacharoff, Avi (2008). 34 Days: Israel, Hezbollah, and the War in Lebanon. New York: Palgrave Macmillan.
- Human Rights Watch (September 2007). Why They Died: Civilian Casualties in Lebanon during the 2006 War (PDF) (Report). Human Rights Watch.
- Flooding South Lebanon: Israel's Use of Cluster Munitions in Lebanon in July and August 2006 (PDF) (Report). Human Rights Watch. February 2008.
- Matthews, Matt M., "We Were Caught Unprepared: The 2006 Hezbollah-Israeli War", The Long War Series Occasional Paper 26, U.S. Army Combined Arms Center Combat Studies Institute Press Fort Leavenworth, Kansas, 2006
- Rapaport, Amir, אש על כוחותינו: כך הכשלנו את עצמנו במלחמת לבנון השנייה (Friendly Fire, How We Failed Ourselves in the Second Lebanon War), Sifriya Ma'ariv, 2007
- Shelah, Ofer; Limor, Yoav (2007). Captives in Lebanon, the truth about the Second Lebanon War (Hebrew). Yediot books.

Chapter 1 Hannibal

- The final Winograd Commission report (Hebrew)
