= Battle of Wadi Saluki =

Israeli attack on Hezbollah in 2006

- Part of the 2006 Lebanon War
Date	11–13 August 2006 (3 days)
Location	Bint Jbeil District, Ghandouriyeh, south of Litani River, Wadi Saluki, Lebanon
Result	Inconclusive

Belligerents
Israel	Hezbollah

Commanders and leaders
(Israel) Mickey Edelstein	(Hezbollah) Hassan Nasrallah (Hezbollah) Imad Mughniyeh

Units involved
(Israel) Israeli Defence Forces: 162nd Division, 401st Brigade; Nahal Brigade; 226th Paratroopers Brigade; HaMachatz 605 battalion	Hezbollah troops in South Lebanon and anti tank squads

Strength
(Israel) 3,000 - 4,000 soldiers	Hezbollah troops around the Litani River

Casualties and losses
(Israel) 33 soldiers killed (Israel) Several dozen injured (Israel) Several armoured vehicles destroyed/damaged	9 troops killed 1 captured (Hezbollah claim) 80 troops killed Several dozen injured (Israeli claim)

The Battle of Wadi Saluki also known as the Battle of Wadi al-Hujeir was a battle within the framework of Operation Change of Direction 11 that took place at the end of the Second Lebanon War between the armored forces of the 162nd Division, 401st Brigade, and infantry of the Nahal Brigade and the Combat Engineering Corps and Hezbollah fighters, in the area of river Saluki and the villages of Ghanduriyah and Faron. The battle is considered one of the hardest-fought battles in the Second Lebanon War.

== History ==
The battle of Wadi Saluki was the last part of Operation Change of Direction 11 announced by Prime Minister of Israel at the time, Ehud Olmert, in the final days of the Second Lebanon War. The goal was to cross the Saluki stream to direct additional forces towards the Litani River. The decision to cross the stream came from the High Command after United Nations Security Council Resolution 1701 came into effect. Ground forces of the Nahal Brigade were supposed to cover the movement of tanks from the 401st Brigade that were vulnerable to 9M133 Kornet missiles.

According to the plan, forces from the Nahal Brigade, commanded by Col. Mickey Edelstein, were flown in helicopters to Saluki for the mission of securing the 4th Merkava tank convoy from the 401st Brigade. Battalion 931, under the command of Lt. Col. Avi Dahan, began by occupying the village of Ghanduriyah and encountered strong resistance from Hezbollah fighters. Battalion 932, under the command of Lt. Col. Ran Kahana, who followed behind Battalion 931, entered the village to rescue the wounded and then moved to attack the village from his side the second The battle in Ghanduriyah was of central importance because with the breakthrough of this Hezbollah fortified formation, the road to the west was opened for the forces of the division.

The Combat Engineering Corps from Battalion 605 under Lt. Col. Usheri Logsi (with the assistance of Lt. Col. Avi (Brimou) Cohen) broke through the road to the village of Rab El Thalathine and the axis from Khirbat Kasif through Wadi Barach towards Wadi Saluki. Later, they broke through and cleared 16 km from a necessary axis, which the Armored Brigade and the Nahal Brigade moved after it. The axis led to the village of Ghanduriyah above the Saluki Wadi, where several IDF tanks were hit by anti-tank fire. The 401st company fighters rescued the wounded under heavy fire. Hezbollah fighters took advantage of the procrastination of the political echelon that postponed the operation for several hours, studying the operation patterns of the IDF soldiers and organizing to stop the forces using advanced anti-tank missiles. The order to cross the stream came on the morning of 12 August 2006, about eight hours after the UN ceasefire. The series of serious malfunctions in the battle started at the very beginning when the order to cross was given on the encrypted phone and not on a walkie-talkie, which was used by most of the troop commanders.

At that time, the Nahal Brigade was fighting fierce battles in the villages around the Saluki River, Ghanduriyah, and Froun, where the patrol battalion of the Nahal Brigade under the command of Lt. Col. Shay Elbaz was fighting, after being dropped from helicopters near the village. The General Staff failed to inform them that the tank convoy was making its way west, even though the Nahal HCP and the 401st Brigade HCP were located in two separate rooms of the same house, in the East Bank of the stream. Nahal Brigade soldiers were unaware that their main task was to secure the movement of the armored forces. When the tanks of the 401st Brigade crossed the channel without the intended security, they were severely hit by anti-tank fire, mainly Kornet missiles. The tank movement made another critical mistake when it moved in a different direction from what the Nahal Brigade expected and was exposed to enemy fire for the second time. The wounded of the 9th Battalion were rescued from the tanks by the fighters of the 401th company, led by the incoming patrol commander, Major Yossi Panso, a veteran of the Golani Brigade. They even helped rescue the victims of the Nahal Brigade. After the war, five of the unit's soldiers received decorations for their work during it, including Sgt. Itai Steinberger, who was killed in the battle in Andoriya in the eastern sector, and Yotam Shesh, a team commander in a patrol, who received the Chief of Staff's TLS.

On Saturday, 12 August, when the armored forces were involved in crossing the Saluki and suffered many casualties, the commander of the "Black Eagle" paratrooper brigade, Col. Boaz Amidror, turned to the commander of 7056, one of the battalions in his brigade, Lt. Col. Amos Brizel, and asked if he was able, with the power he had at his disposal, to take control of the village of al-Kozair, which controls the crossing from the north and where Hezbollah's anti-tank squads were entrenched, and shooting at IDF tanks crossing the Saluki valleys. Brizel was at the time with his forces in the village of Deir-Sirian, which he had occupied with the reserve paratroopers battalion under his command four days earlier. Although he had no intelligence aids and the supply situation was poor, Brizel replied in the affirmative. The headquarters officers of the battalion, led by the general, gathered in Beit Badir-Sirian and drew on a paper napkin a battle register of the village, as they remembered it from an observation they had made a few days earlier. The register was copied onto additional paper napkins and distributed to the commanders of the companies in the battalion. The battalion left for its mission on Sunday Early in the morning. By noon the paratroopers had completed the takeover of the village and the scanning of the branch controlling the Saluki.

The original task of crossing the Saluki River was eventually completed a few hours later than planned. While the forces were prepared to continue the operation in their movement towards the Litani River, Defense Minister Amir Peretz and Chief of Staff Dan Halutz decided to stop the advance following the downing of a CH53 helicopter by Hezbollah.

== Casualties ==
IDF forces suffered 33 deaths and dozens of wounded from among the infantry, armor and combat engineering fighters. Two of eight Merkava tanks in the battle were destroyed by Kornet anti-tank guided missiles. Despite the casualties, the delays and the entanglement of the forces throughout the battle, the IDF forces managed to cross the Saluki. Hezbollah claimed the death of nine of its soldiers, and one was taken prisoner.
