= Shusha (disambiguation) =

Shusha is a city in Azerbaijan.

Shusha and similar may mean one of the following:

== Places ==
- Shusha fortress, a fortress around the city of Shusha
- Shusha District, a district of Azerbaijan Republic
- Shushi Province, a former province in the Nagorno-Karabakh Republic

=== Abu Shusha ===
- Abu Shusha, Palestinian Arab village in the Ramle Subdistrict of Mandatory Palestine, located 8 km southeast of Ramle. It was depopulated in May 1948.
- Abu Shusha, Palestinian Arab village in the Haifa Subdistrict. It was depopulated during the 1947–48 Civil War in Mandatory Palestine on 9 April 1948 during the Battle of Mishmar HaEmek
- Ghuwayr Abu Shusha, Palestinian Arab village in the Tiberias Subdistrict. It was depopulated during the 1947–1948 Civil War in Mandatory Palestine on April 21, 1948. It was located 8 km north of Tiberias, nearby Wadi Rubadiyya.

== People ==
- Zhu Xi (1130–1200), Confucian scholar
- Xuxa (born 1963), Brazilian entertainer
- Shusha Guppy (1935–2008), Persian folk singer

== Others ==
- Shusha FK, Azerbaijani football club based in Baku. It represented the city of Shusha
- Shusha massacre, the mass killing of the Armenian population of Shusha and the destruction of the Armenian half of the city that followed the suppression of the Armenian revolt against the authorities of the Azerbaijan Democratic Republic in 1920
