= Keren Tendler =

Israeli helicopter flight mechanic

- קרן טנדלר
- Born: September 26, 1979
- Died: August 12, 2006 (aged 26)

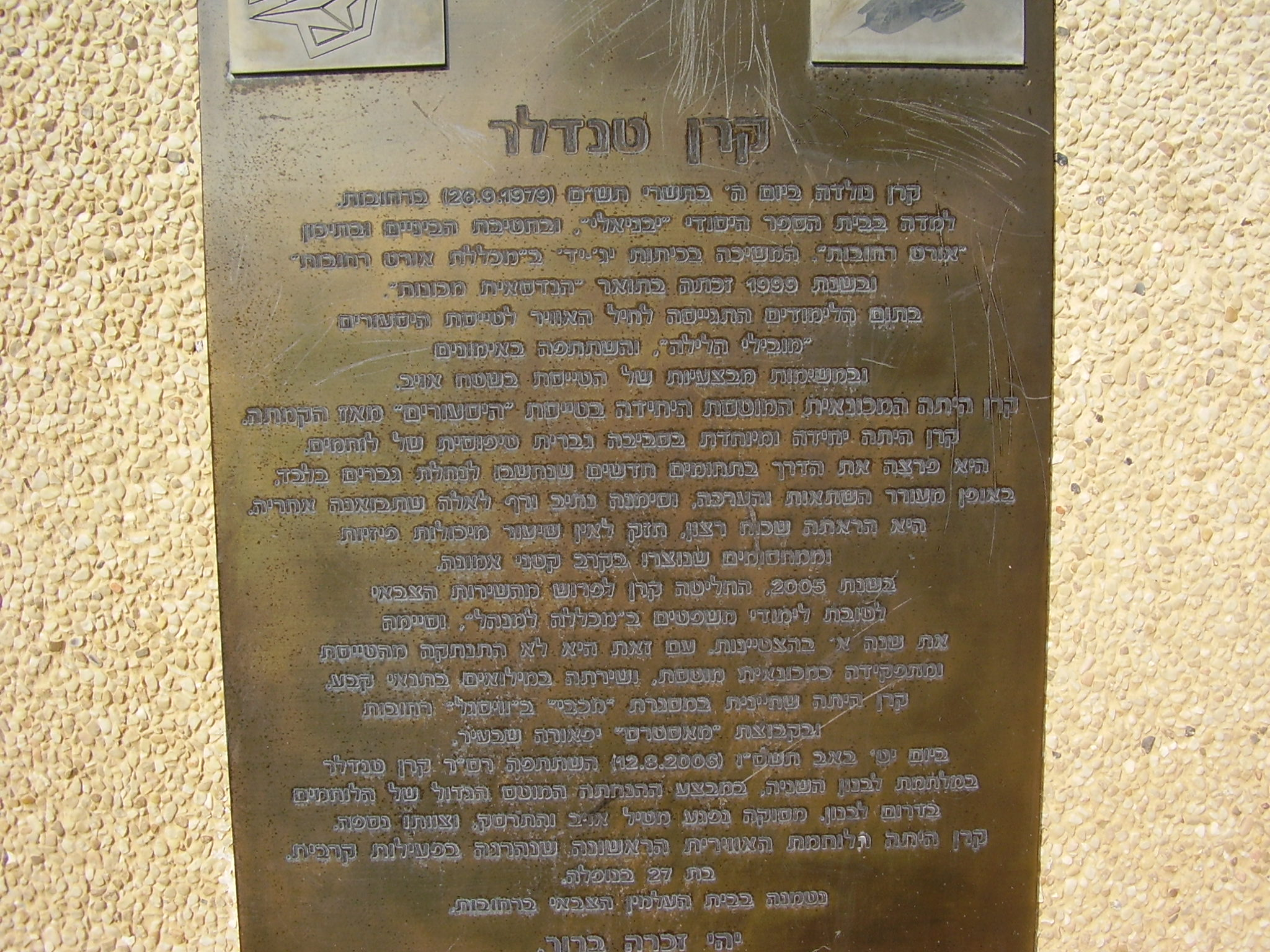
Keren Tendler Garden in Rehovot

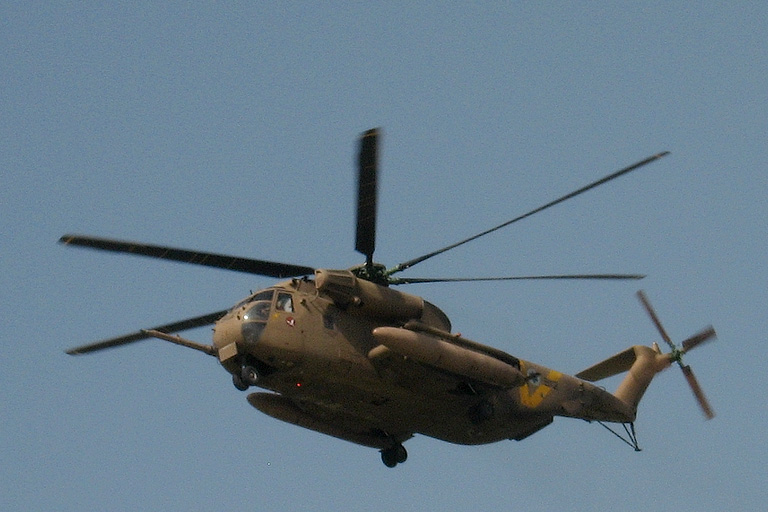
IAF CH-53 Yas'ur

Keren Tendler (Hebrew: קרן טנדלר; September 26, 1979 - August 12, 2006) was Israel's first female helicopter flight mechanic soon after the supreme court allowed women to serve in combat positions.

She was the first female Israeli soldier to die on active duty in Lebanon. Tendler was killed during the 2006 Israel-Lebanon conflict, along with four other crew members, when their helicopter, a CH-53 Sea Stallion Yas'ur, was shot down upon lifting off in Lebanon.

== Biography ==
Tendler was born on 26 September 1979 in Rehovot, the eldest child of Riwona and Dan, who had immigrated to Israel from Romania. She had one brother.

She attended the ORT school in Rehovot, where she studied computer-aided design and manufacturing (CAD/CAM). Tendler completed her matriculation examinations at the age of 17 and a half. In July 1997, she began her military service with an early induction and subsequently continued her studies in the 13th–14th grade programs at ORT College. In 1999, she graduated as a practical engineer in mechanical engineering.

After completing her military service, Tendler began studying law at the College of Management Academic Studies.

Tendler was an accomplished swimmer. She trained with the Maccabi Weizgal and Masters Yafora swimming clubs in Rehovot, participated in numerous swimming competitions, and won medals.

=== Military service ===
In 2000, after completing her studies, Tendler enlisted in the Israeli Air Force. She completed an aircraft maintenance course at the IAF Technical School in Haifa and was assigned to a CH-53 Sea Stallion helicopter squadron at Tel Nof Airbase, where she served as a ground mechanic. In 2000, she took part in a firefighting mission in Greece. During the mission, she was interviewed by Galei Tzahal and received coverage in the Greek media.

After signing on for permanent military service in January 2001, Tendler underwent selection tests for the airborne mechanic course. She completed advanced infantry basic training (Rifleman 07) and the course's selection process, and was accepted into the program. She was the only woman in the course, which lasted approximately eight months. Upon completion, she received airborne mechanic wings and qualified as a military parachutist. She subsequently served as an airborne mechanic in 114 Squadron, becoming the first woman to hold the position.

In 2005, Tendler left permanent military service with the rank of First Sergeant and turned to studying law.

In 2006, when the 2006 Lebanon War broke out, Tendler was serving in the military reserves under a permanent-service arrangement. Initially, her commanders refused to assign her to missions beyond enemy lines. However, after she protested what she considered discrimination on the basis of her sex, it was decided that she would be permitted to take part in operational flights beyond enemy lines. On 11 August, she began participating in operational missions across the Israel–Lebanon border.

=== Her Death ===
On 12 August, the helicopter aboard which Tendler was serving took part in Operation Change of Direction 11, transporting troops by helicopter to a location deep inside Lebanon. After the troops had been landed, as the helicopter was taking off, Hezbollah operatives fired a missile at it. The helicopter was hit and crashed in a valley in an area under Hezbollah control.

All five crew members aboard the helicopter were killed. Paratroopers who witnessed the crash quickly recovered the bodies of the crew, but were unable to locate Tendler's body. Forces from Shaldag Unit, Unit 669, and the Mobility Unit were dispatched deep into enemy territory to search for her remains. They were found only three days after the crash, beneath the helicopter's tail section. The soldiers remained concealed in Lebanon for an entire day with her remains in order to bring them back to Israel for burial.

During the night of 15–16 August 2006, Tendler's remains were carried on a long journey on foot from Lebanon to the Israeli border by soldiers from Unit 669 and Shaldag, accompanied by paratroopers.

Tendler was buried on 16 August 2006 at the military cemetery in Rehovot.

== Legacy ==
A garden was inaugurated in her memory on 7 August 2007 in Rehovot, Israel.

A scholarship was established in her name to encourage young women to pursue technical careers in military aviation.

Her career has been cited as an example of the changing role of women in the Israel Defense Forces.
