= Wadi Saluki =

District in Lebanon

Wadi Saluki or Wadi Sulouqi (English: Saluki Creek; (Arabic: وادي السلوقي, romanized: Wādī as-Salūqī) is a stream in Wadi Al-Hujeir, southern Lebanon.

== Toponym ==
Wadi Saluki or Wadi Sulouqi is believed to have gotten its name from Arab Bedouins who were familiar with the ancient Saluki (Arabic: سلوقي) dog breed, which is revered for its swiftness in the Middle Eastern societies. This could be a reference to a hunting area, or a breeding ground where this breed was particularly common or famous in the area of Wadi Saluki.

Or, the stream's actual physical characteristics, perhaps its swift, winding nature reminded people of the dog.

Another theory is that the name is derived from a “long vanished city”, “Saluq” (Arabic: سلوق), said to have been in South Arabia.

== History ==
In 1999, during the South Lebanon conflict a clash broke out between Israel Defense Forces troops and Hezbollah fighters in Wadi Saluki in which two IDF soldiers and three Hezbollah fighters were killed in the fighting. Hezbollah announced that the incident was revenge for the assassination of their commander Ali Hassan Deeb.

In 2006 as part of the second Lebanon war the IDF and Hezbollah engaged in a combat encounter across several days in the area known as the Battle of Wadi Saluki.

On 2 November 2023, four Hezbollah members were killed in Wadi Saluki during a shelling by Israeli soldiers.
