= Al-Barriyya =

Al-Barriyya البريّة
- Etymology: The desert
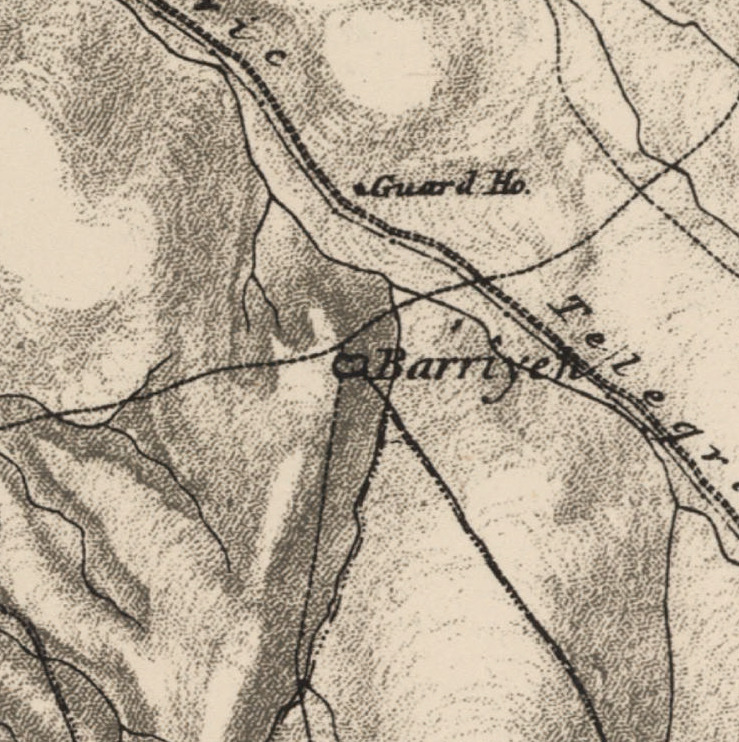
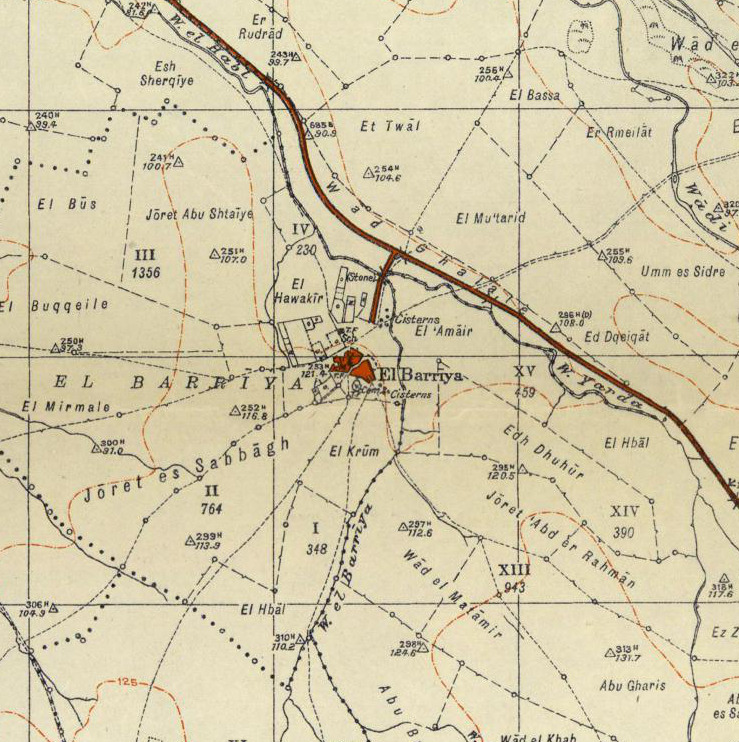
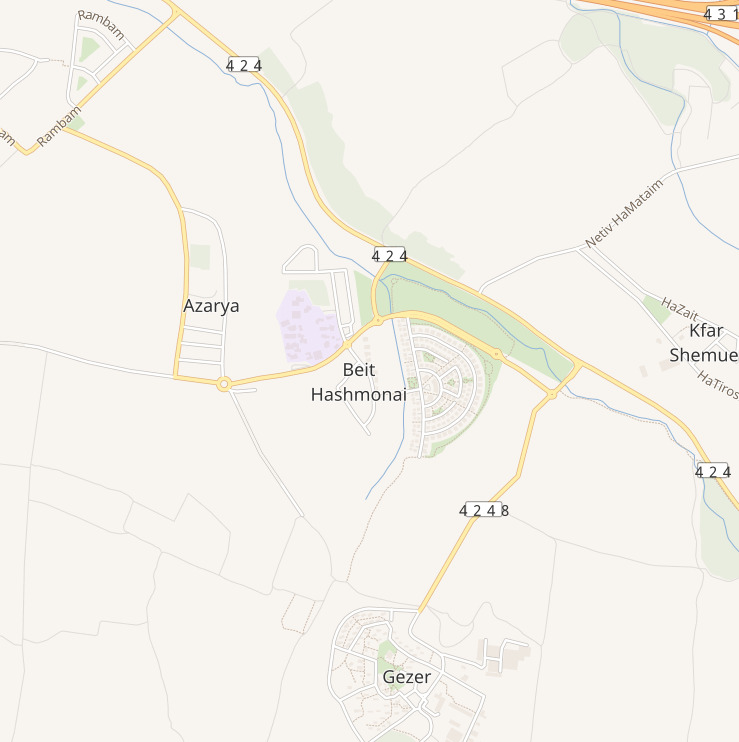
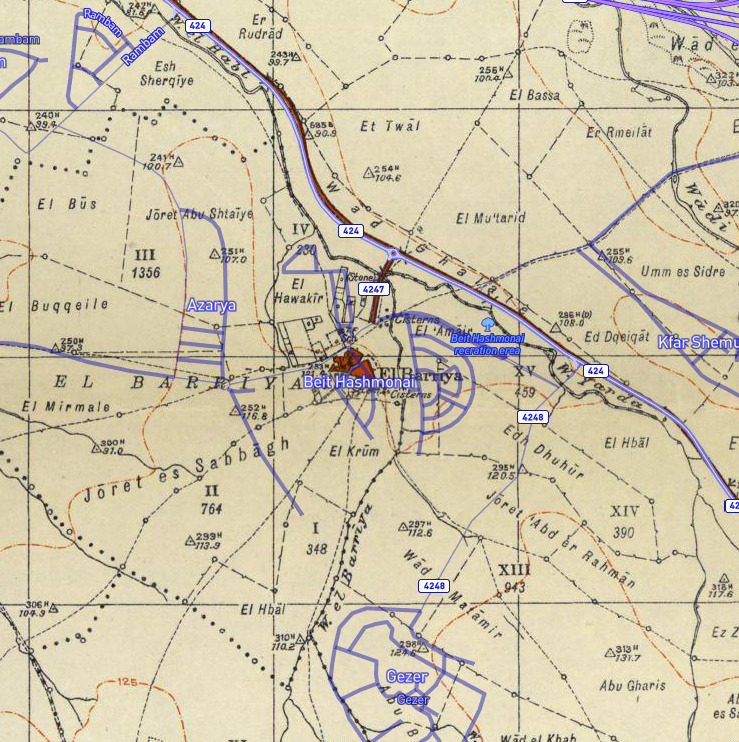
- 1870s map 1940s map modern map 1940s with modern overlay map A series of historical maps of the area around Al-Barriyya (click the buttons)

- Location within Mandatory Palestine
- Coordinates: 31°53′17″N 34°55′6″E
- Palestine grid: 142/144
- Geopolitical entity: Mandatory Palestine
- Subdistrict: Ramle
- Date of depopulation: July 10–13, 1948

Area
  - Total: 2,831 dunams (2.831 km^{2}; 1.093 sq mi)

Population (1945)
  - Total: 510
- Cause(s) of depopulation: Military assault by Yishuv forces
- Current Localities: Azarya, Beyt Chashmonay

Al-Barriyya was a Palestinian village in the Ramle Subdistrict of Mandatory Palestine. It was depopulated during the 1948 Arab–Israeli War on July 10, 1948, as part of Operation Dani. It was located 5.5 km southeast of Ramla, on the eastern bank of Wadi al-Barriyya.

The area of the destroyed village has been overbuilt by Beit Hashmonai.

== History ==
The Survey of Western Palestine (SWP) noted in 1882 that: "The name Barriyeh, 'Desert,' applied to a village, is explained by the inhabitants to be due to their ancestors having about 50 years ago lived in Abu Shusheh, whence they were expelled by the other villagers, and had to settle in the 'Desert,' or 'Outer Part.' They own most of the gardens of Abu Shusheh at the present day. This information is obtained from Mr. Bergheim." While the name is recorded already in the 16th century, the literal etymology of "desert, outer part' is confirmed by modern comparative linguistics.

In 1860, Saintine described it as a "modern village", without any antiquities. In 1863 Victor Guérin noted that the village was situated on a low eminence, and "the few houses which compose it consist of roughly constructed huts."

An official Ottoman village list of about 1870 showed that it had a total of 20 houses and a population of 72, though the population count included men, only.

In 1882, PEF's Survey of Western Palestine (SWP) described as a small adobe hamlet, surrounded by cultivated land.

=== British Mandate era ===
After the end of World War I, the Ottoman Empire was partitioned and a Palestine mandate was accorded to Britain by the League of Nations. In the 1922 census of Palestine conducted by the British Mandate authorities, Bariyeh had a population of 295 residents; all Muslims, increasing in the 1931 census to 388, still all Muslims, in a total of 86 houses.

In the 1945 statistics, the village had a population of 510 Muslims with total of 2,831 dunums of land. Of this, 51 dunums of land were used for plantations and irrigable land, 2,627 dunums were used for cereals, while 55 dunams were classified as built-up public areas.

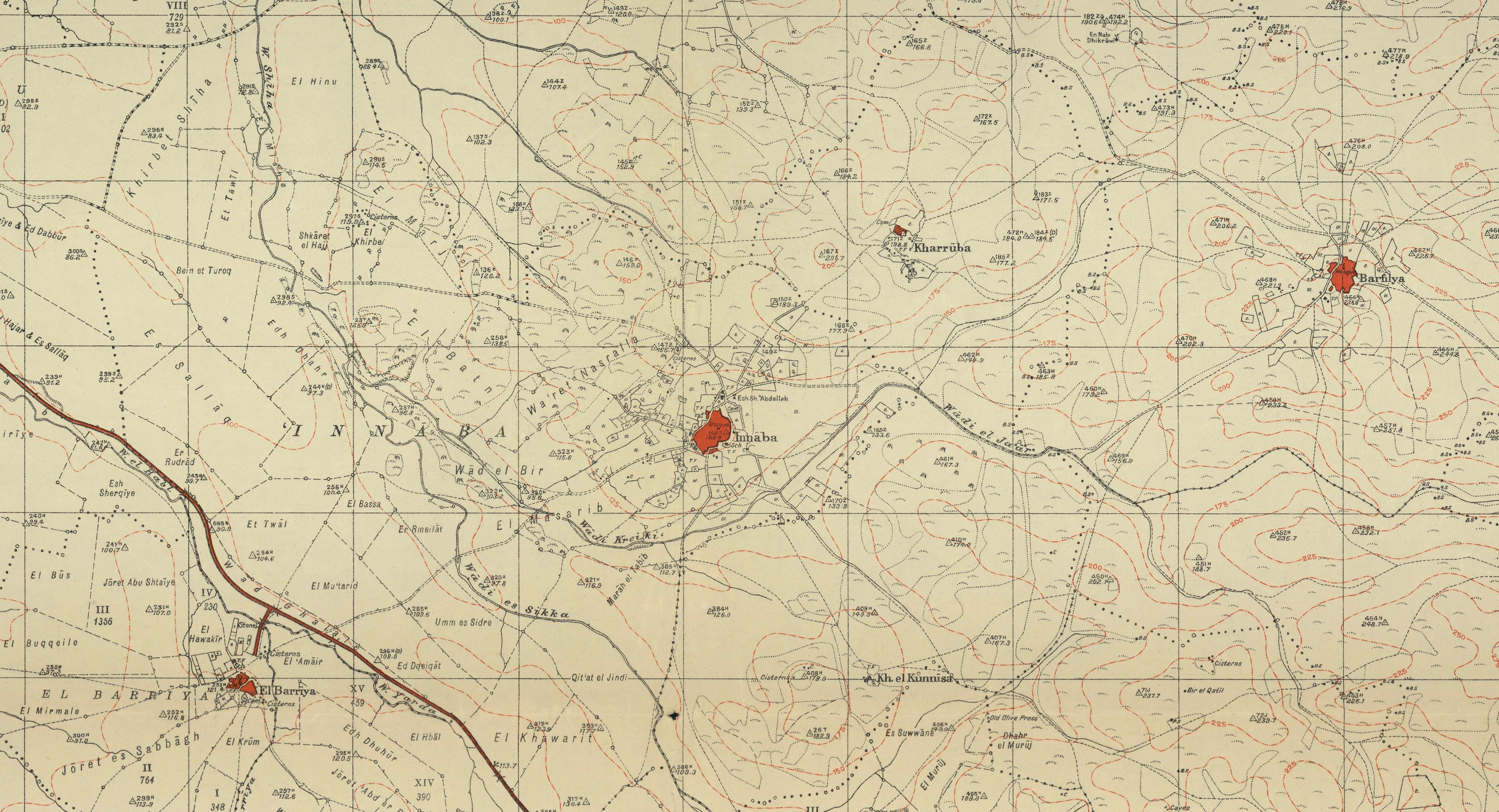
Al-Barriya 1942 Survey of Palestine 1:20,000

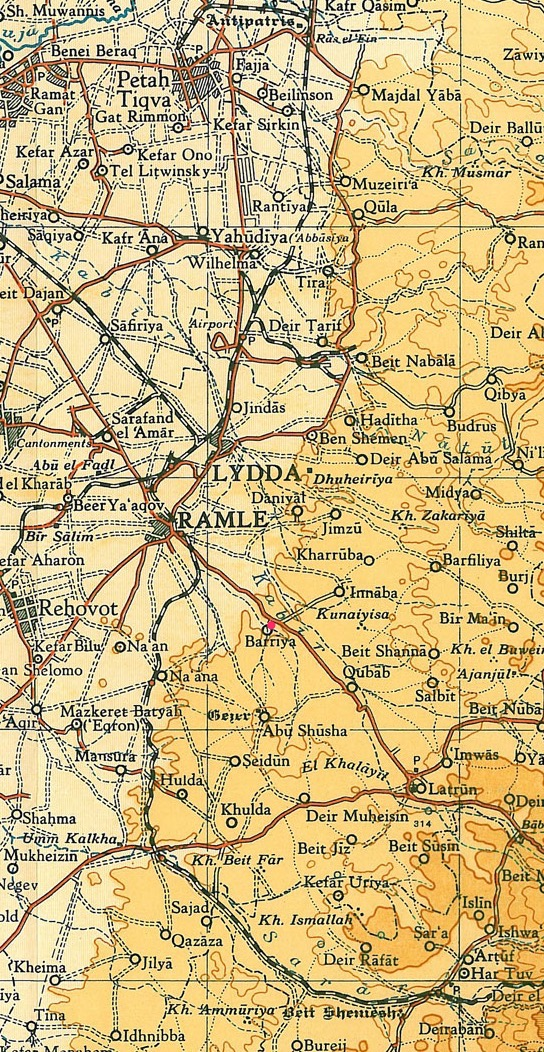
Al-Barriyya. Survey of Palestine. 1945. Scale 1:250,000

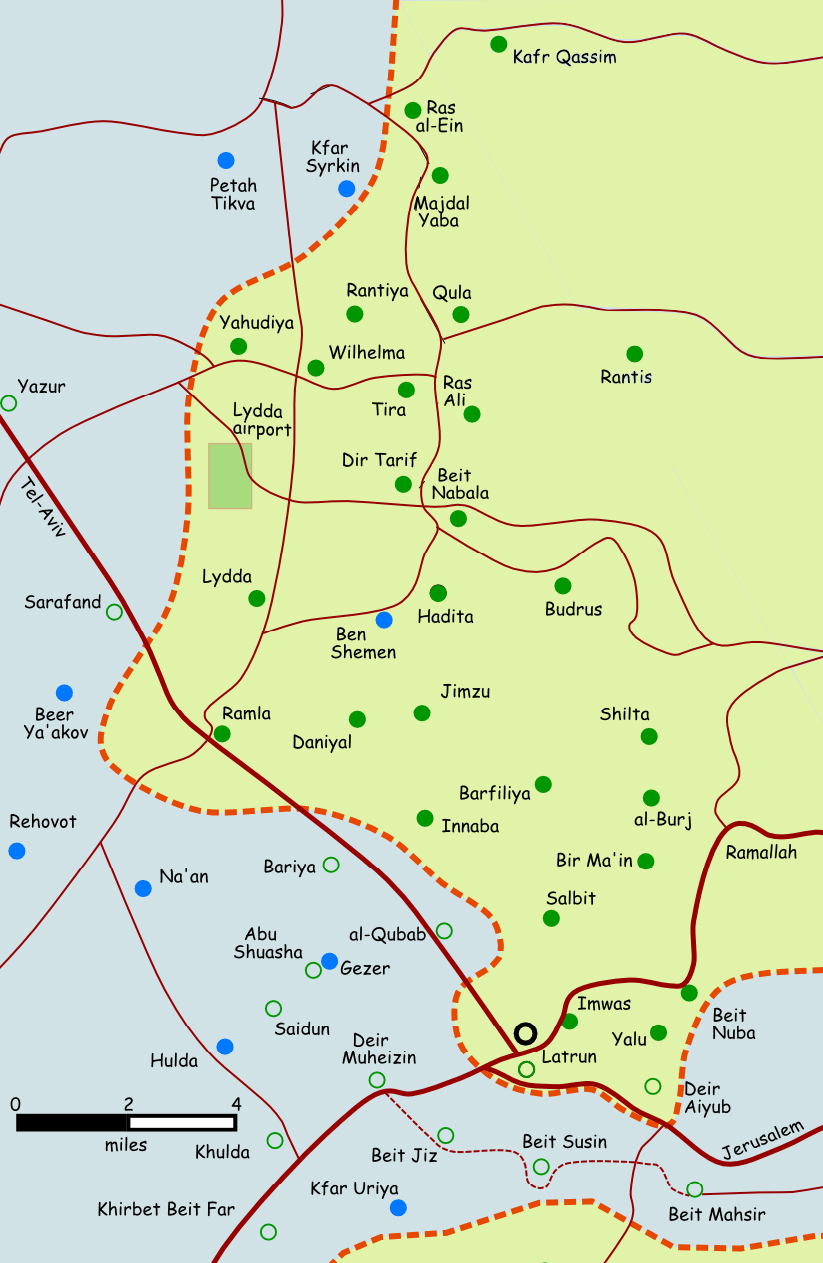
Palestinian villages depopulated in the area around Lydda and Ramla (coloured in green)

=== 1948, aftermath ===
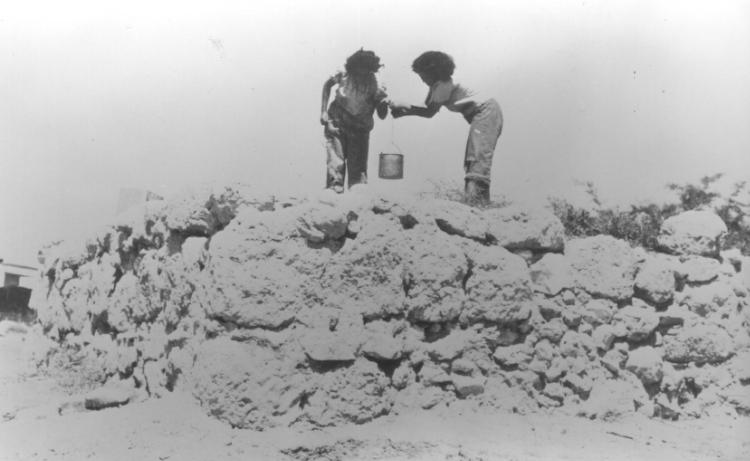
Women from Yiftach Brigade raising water from a cistern in Al-Barriyya. Operation Danny, July 1948

The village was depopulated on July 10–13, 1948, after military assault by Israeli forces, as part of Operation Dani.

The Israeli settlements of Azarya and Beyt Chashmonay was constructed on village land.

In 1992 the village site was described: "The village site is mostly cleared and has been leveled except for one remaining stone house and fragments of the walls of two concrete houses with steel bars protruding from them".

== Bibliography ==
- Barron, J.B., ed. (1923). Palestine: Report and General Abstracts of the Census of 1922. Government of Palestine.
- Conder, C.R.; Kitchener, H.H. (1882). The Survey of Western Palestine: Memoirs of the Topography, Orography, Hydrography, and Archaeology. Vol. 2. London: Committee of the Palestine Exploration Fund.
- Department of Statistics (1945). Village Statistics, April, 1945. Government of Palestine.
- Guérin, V. (1868). Description Géographique Historique et Archéologique de la Palestine (in French). Vol. 1: Judee, pt. 1. Paris: L'Imprimerie Nationale.
- Hadawi, S. (1970). Village Statistics of 1945: A Classification of Land and Area ownership in Palestine. Palestine Liberation Organization Research Center. Archived from the original on 2018-12-08.
- Hartmann, M. (1883). "Die Ortschaftenliste des Liwa Jerusalem in dem türkischen Staatskalender für Syrien auf das Jahr 1288 der Flucht (1871)". Zeitschrift des Deutschen Palästina-Vereins. 6: 102–149.
- Khalidi, W. (1992). All That Remains: The Palestinian Villages Occupied and Depopulated by Israel in 1948. Washington D.C.: Institute for Palestine Studies. ISBN 0-88728-224-5.
- Mills, E., ed. (1932). Census of Palestine 1931. Population of Villages, Towns and Administrative Areas. Jerusalem: Government of Palestine.
- Morris, B. (2004). The Birth of the Palestinian Refugee Problem Revisited. Cambridge University Press. ISBN 978-0-521-00967-6.
- Palmer, E.H. (1881). The Survey of Western Palestine: Arabic and English Name Lists Collected During the Survey by Lieutenants Conder and Kitchener, R. E. Transliterated and Explained by E.H. Palmer. Committee of the Palestine Exploration Fund.
- Saintine, P. Gérardy (1860). Trois ans en Judée (in French). Hachette.
- Socin, A. (1879). "Alphabetisches Verzeichniss von Ortschaften des Paschalik Jerusalem". Zeitschrift des Deutschen Palästina-Vereins. 2: 135–163.
