= Mickey Edelstein =

Israeli military general (born 1966)

- מיקי אדלשטיין
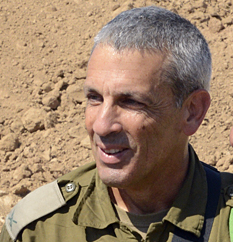
- Born: May 1966 (age 60); Jerusalem, Israel
- Military career
- Allegiance: Israel
- Branch: Israel Defense Forces
- Service years: 1986–present
- Rank: Aluf (major-general)
- Unit: Shaldag Unit
- Commands: Duvdevan Unit, 202 "Tsefa" (Viper) paratroop battalion, the Nahal Brigade, the Gaza Division, IDF's military attaché in the United States
- Conflicts: South Lebanon conflict (1985–2000); First Intifada; Second Intifada; 2006 Lebanon War; Operation Cast Lead; Operation Pillar of Defense; Operation Protective Edge

Mickey Edelstein (Hebrew: מיקי אדלשטיין; born May 1966) is a major-general in the Israel Defense Forces, and the IDF's military attaché in the United States.

== Biography ==
Michael (Mickey) Edelstein was born in Omer. He was drafted into the IDF in 1986 and volunteered to the Israeli Air Force special forces unit Shaldag. He served as a soldier and a squad leader.

== Military career ==
Edelstein became an infantry officer after completing Officer Candidate School and return to the unit as a platoon leader. Later he served as a company commander in the unit and in Givati Brigade. He was the commander of Duvdevan Unit, an elite special forces unit and later led 202 "Tsefa" (Viper) paratroop battalion during the Second Intifada. Afterwards he commanded the Nahal Brigade May 2006 to May 2008, including during the Second Lebanon War, and served as head of the Paratroopers and Infantry Corps.

He was appointed Commander of the Gaza Division in November 2012, responsible for Israel's border with Gaza, replacing General Yossi Bachar. He was the primary commander of the Israeli army in the Gaza Strip during the 2014 Israel–Gaza conflict. In 2016 he was promoted to the rank of aluf (Major general) and was appointed as the IDF's military attaché in the United States.
