= Beit Hashmonai =

Community settlement in central Israel

Beit Hashomai: בֵּית חַשְׁמוֹנַאי (Hebrew)
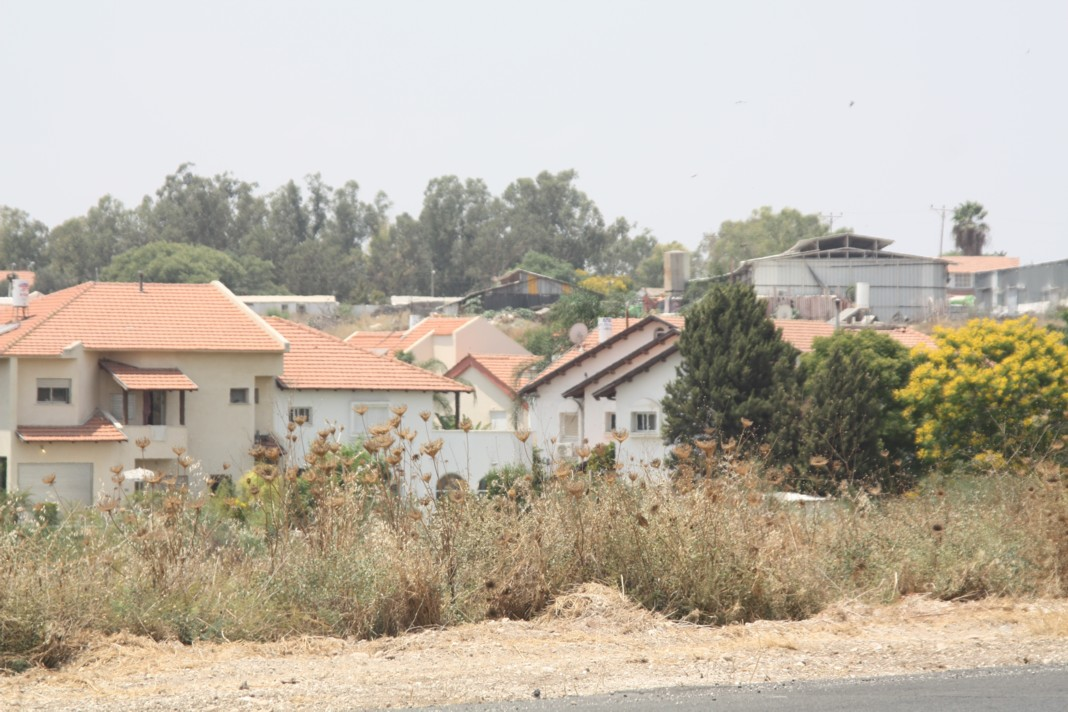
- Etymology: Hasmonean House
- Location within Central Israel Location within Israel
- Coordinates: 31°53′26″N 34°54′58″E
- Country: Israel
- District: Central
- Subdistrict: Ramla
- Council: Gezer
- Founded: 1970
- Founder: Jewish Agency
- Population (2024): 2,153

Beit Hashmonai (Hebrew: בֵּית חַשְׁמוֹנַאי, lit. 'Hasmonean House') is a community settlement in central Israel. Located five kilometers south-east of Ramla, it falls under the jurisdiction of Gezer Regional Council. In 2024, it had a population of 2,153..

== History ==
Beit Hashmonai was established in 1970 by the Jewish Agency for teachers at the nearby Ayalon School on land located near the depopulated Palestinian village of al-Barriyya. It is named for Simon Maccabaeus, a member of the Hasmonean family who captured the ancient city of Gezer, located nearby.

In 1987 it was designated a community centre for the regional council, with the council's offices moved to the village.
