= Operation Change of Direction 11 =

Israeli military operation

Operation Change of Direction
- Part of 2006 Lebanon War
Date	August 11–14, 2006
Location	Southern Lebanon
Result	IDF captures some territory but fails to seize objectives. End of the war and Israeli withdrawal under UN Security Council Resolution 1701

Belligerents
Israel Defense Forces	Hezbollah

Commanders and leaders
Lt. Gen. Dan Halutz; Chief of staff Maj. Gen. Moshe Kaplinsky; Deputy Chief of Staff; Brig. Gen. Udi Adam; Head of Northern Command Brig. Gen. Eyal Eisenberg; OC 98th Div. Brig. Gen. Gal Hirsch; OC 91st Div. Brig. Gen. Guy Tzur; OC 162nd Div. Brig. Gen. Erez Zuckerman; OC 366th Div	Hassan Nasrallah; Ali Mahmoud Salih †

Units involved
91st Infantry Division (The Galilee Formation); 98th Paratrooper Division (The Fire Formation); 162nd Armored Division (The Steel Formation); 366th Armored Division (Pillar of Fire Formation)	Nasr Unit (Special Forces); Village mobilization units

Strength
30,000 inside Lebanon	1,000 in area (south of the Litani river)

Casualties and losses
34 killed 447 IDF wounded, 1 helicopter downed, 20+ vehicles damaged and immobilized	9 killed (in the north only); 1 captured(Hezbollah claim); 80+ killed(IDF estimate)
- 1 Israeli civilian killed and 157 Israeli civilians wounded Lebanese civilian casualties unknown

The Operation Change of Direction 11 was the final offensive operation by the Israel Defense Forces (IDF) during the 2006 Lebanon War that began on August 11, 2006, and ended three days later when the ceasefire came into effect. It involved a tripling of Israeli forces inside Lebanon and aimed at encircling Hizbullah forces in south Lebanon. The plan was to advance westwards along the Litani River from the Galilee Panhandle, combined with helicopter landings behind enemy lines, intended to be the largest in IDF history, and simultaneous advances northwards in the central sector and along the Mediterranean coast. The plan was to follow up the offensive by several weeks of mopping-up operations in the surrounded territories, eliminating Hizbullah infrastructure, especially in the launching areas of Katyusha rockets.

The offensive was called off halfway due to heavy casualties and the implementation of the UN ceasefire. At least 33 Israeli officers and soldiers were killed and over 400 were wounded, an Israeli Air Force (IAF) helicopter was shot down and scores of Israeli tanks were damaged. The IDF never reached the Litani river and failed to surround Hizbullah forces in South Lebanon. Instead the Israeli government on August 13, accepted a ceasefire in accordance with UN Security Council Resolution 1701. When the ceasefire commenced the following day IDF found itself in control of 16 different pockets or sectors in South Lebanon, often isolated from each other and from Israeli territory. IDF expressed a desire to withdraw from these positions as quickly as possible, as soon as a ceasefire agreement was in place. Hizbullah remained in control of both Bint Jbeil and Ayta ash-Sha'b, close to the border, while IDF soldiers were operating well to the north of both these towns.

== The Plan ==
According to the plan Brig. Gen. Eyal Eisenberg’s Reserve 98th Paratrooper Division would be airlifted to the central sector, south of the Litani river, in what was envisioned as the largest airlift in IDF history. Brig. Gen. Gal Hirsch’s 91st Division would proceed north and link up with Eisenberg’s forces. Brig. Gen. Guy Tzur’s 162nd Armored Division would cross the Sulouqi/Hujeir river from the east along the Litani and sweep west and link up with the other IDF forces at Juwwiya. With the exception of the city of Tyre the entire South Lebanon, south of the Litani river, would then be effectively surrounded by Israeli forces. Brig. Gen. Erez Zuckerman' 366th Division was assigned to capture al-Khiyam and the adjoining areas from where rocket fire was directed at Northern Israel.

The Israeli government was initially determined to continue the fighting in spite of the Security Council resolution's call for a cease-fire by 8 AM August 14. The IDF command had asked for at least a full month of fighting to complete the mission; one week to capture the territory south of the Litani, two to four weeks for mopping-up operations and another week for the exit. When the operation was finally launched IDF had only 60 hours before the ceasefire would eventually commence.

IDF Chief of Staff Dan Halutz said the IDF would fight until the ceasefire was implemented. Israeli Government officials claimed that IDF operations would not stop "until the army's goals were reached, despite the passage of UN Security Council resolution 1701."

== The battles in the North ==
The fighting in the north was formally not part of Operation Change of Direction 11 but were preparatory steps for its implementation. On the night of August 8, units belonging to the reserve brigade of the 366th Division (Pillar of Fire Formation), under the command of Brigadier General Erez Zuckerman, advanced northward and reached the Christian town of Marj'ayoun, 9 kilometers from the border. The Israeli forces initially did not encounter any resistance and there were no clashes inside the town. It appears that a secular leftist party (probably the SSNP) aligned to Hezbullah eventually offered some resistance. Fighting erupted outside Marj'ayoun and the nearby Shiite town of al-Khiyam. A supply convoy was hit by missiles. Israeli media reported that IDF forces began August 8, operating "in al-Khiam", from where a large number of rockets were being fired at northern Galilee.

The day after the Israeli Cabinet finally approved the advance towards the Litani.

On August 10, an Israeli tank belonging to the 366th Division got stuck near the Christian town of al-Qulay’ah, facing the Shi’ite town of al-Khiyam, on the other side of the valley. A column of tanks that came to its rescue were targeted by Hizbullah missiles. Several tanks took hits and seven soldiers were injured, four of them seriously.

The entire battalion got involved in the rescue mission, after which the battalion promptly returned to Israeli territory, ignoring orders to continue the advance towards Marj'ayoun. Apparently the battalion commander’s tank was left stranded in the town with only an APC to back him up. The brigade commander was therefore relieved of his command after the war. The unit became known after the war as "the brigade that ran away."

Another battalion commander from the same brigade was ordered into Lebanon to assist in the evacuation of the trapped units. He expressed his reservations about advancing in broad daylight and asked to be relieved of his command.

One of the tank crew members later wrote about his experience. The tank company was attacking al-Khiyam at nighttime, circling it and firing into the town when one of the tanks broke down. It had to be towed by a second tank back to Israel, approximately 7 kilometers away. The two tanks could only move by five kilometers an hour and failed to reach Israeli territory before dawn. Both tanks were hit by Kornet missiles that hit the tanks in exactly the same spot, the engine grille and both were penetrated. One of the crew members were killed. Both tanks started burning and were abandoned. The tank crews hid in a ditch before being evacuated by APC's more than an hour later.

Anthony Shadid reported that Hezbullah fighters claimed to have hit and damaged up to a dozen Israeli tanks outside al-Khiyam.

The 366th Division does not seem to have resumed offensive action for the duration of the war and never completed the missions assigned to it. Uri Bar-Yosef described the two-day stand-off as "one of the most humiliating operations in the history of the Israel Defense Forces." A two-day stand-off between an Israeli armored division and an “handful of Hezbollah fighters”. A few months after the war Brig.-Gen. Erez Zuckerman told the IDF Chief of Staff "I have failed, and I resign."

=== The Marj’ayoun tea party ===
The Marj'ayoun garrison of troops from the Lebanese Internal Security Forces did not resist the IDF occupation. The commander General Adnan Daoud invited Israeli soldiers for tea and let them inspect the base. The Israeli troops were accompanied by an Israeli TV team. The pictures of the "Marj'ayoun tea party" were broadcast on Israeli television and soon also on Hizbullah TV channel al-Manar. The scandal lead to General Daoud being placed in house arrest.

An hour after the departure of the Israeli soldiers, four Israeli tanks drove up to the gate of the barracks and blasted the gate. The 350 Lebanese soldiers surrendered without a fight and were disarmed and taken prisoners. The Lebanese soldiers were later released and allowed to evacuate the town. The evacuation convoy was joined by hundreds of cars with civilians, mainly Christians wanting to leave the battle zone. Although the evacuation convoy was coordinated with IDF through UNIFIL it was targeted by an air strike killing of at least seven people.

One of several ambitious targets set by Prime Minister Ehud Olmert in his speech in the Knesset on July 17, 2006 was the deployment of the Lebanese army in "all of Southern Lebanon". It was also one of the cornerstones of the resolution being finalized at the same time in Security Council. On August 17, the Lebanese army returned to the barracks of Marj’ayoun as part of the cease-fire arrangements.

== Central and Western sectors ==
The Paratrooper Division began carrying out preparatory tasks on the night of 8–9 August. IDF forces occupied the Christian village of Dibil, situated to the north of Ayta ash-Sha’b (which was surrounded but still unoccupied) in the central sector. An engineering unit hid in a building in the outskirts of the village but was spotted by Hizbullah scouts and was hit by two missiles fired from Ayta ash-Sha’b. Nine soldiers were killed and 31 wounded. None of them had even fired a single bullet.

The division was ordered to proceed north to the Shiite village of Rashaf, occupy it and open a supply route to the area. The village was eventually occupied but the supply route was not secured. When the cease fire came into effect, the division had advanced about a mile northwards.

Brigadier General Gal Hirsch’s Division 91 was ordered to move west from its positions north of Bint Jbeil towards the Mediterranean coast. "The action proved chaotic" and the operation "fell far short of the mark" by war’s end.

According to the Winograd Commission Division 91 was commissioned with the task of occupying the remaining Hizbullah strongholds near the border, such as Bint Jbeil and Ayta ash-Sha'b. The Report gives no details but notes that both towns remained in Hizbullah hands.

The Alexandroni brigade fought in the western sector. The brigade finally took up position along the coastal road near al-Mansouri after an operation that took eight days rather than the planned 36 hours. The soldiers suffered hard from lack of food and water and dozens collapsed from dehydration and had to be evacuated. The brigade commander Maj. Nati Barak decided not to send his soldiers after Hizbullah fighters hiding in the nearby village. "I have mercy on my soldiers' lives," Barak said. IDF forces managed to advance about one mile north of al-Mansouri by the time the war ended on 14 August.

=== The Bmaryamin landing ===
Friday evening the paratroop brigade under the command of Col. Hagai Mordechai was airlifted to the Bmaryamin plain outside the villages of Yatar and Kafra. For some reason the landing took place much to the south than what was originally planned. According to Harel and Issacharoff the immediate target was the occupation of "village of Jabel-Amal" (probably a mistranslation referring to the town of Yatar in the district of Jabal 'Amil). Yatar was described as "the headquarters of the [Hizbullah] Nasr unit's Second Territorial Subdivision." The mission was to significantly reduce the rocket fire being launched from the area.

Optimism was booming in the Israeli Army Command. According to intelligence estimates Hizbullah was withdrawing. During the night Defence Minister Amir Peretz called Prime Minister Ehud Olmert. "Listen, Hezbollah’s in trouble," Peretz said excitedly to Olmert. "Believe me, there’s never been a flight like this in history. Everything’s going great. If it continues like this, it’ll be spectacular."

When the first Yas’ur (CH-53 Sea Stallion) helicopter took off, after unloading its soldiers, it was hit by a missile and burst into flames and the crew of five was killed instantly. The helicopter was probably shot down with a shoulder-fired, infrared guided SA-7 missile. Five Israeli crew members were killed, including two senior officers and Sgt.-Maj. Keren Tendler, the only female IDF soldier to die in the war.

The Bmaryamin landing was supposed to be the largest heliborne operation in the history of the IDF. After the downing of the helicopter it was apparent that the landing zone had been compromised and that Hizbullah had prepared ambushes in the area. Headquarters decided to call off further landings. Paratroop commander Col. Hagai Mordechai was ordered not to proceed to the target but to abort the mission and hide at the landing zone until next nightfall. More than 200 Paratroopers had landed safely and Mordechai deemed this to be sufficient to carry out the original orders. Instead a precious 24 hours were lost. The next night the mission was again aborted, this time apparently by direct orders from the Prime Minister. Mordechai told an Israeli reporter: "I didn’t think that at this age I’d find myself hiding in the bushes," The paratroopers were never given the opportunity to carry out their assignments. The ceasefire was to take effect at 8 AM the following morning. The paratroopers instead used the darkness of the night and started withdrawing on foot to Israeli territory.

A total of 17 IDF soldiers died in the central and western sectors in Operation Change of Direction 11.

== The battles in the north-eastern sector ==
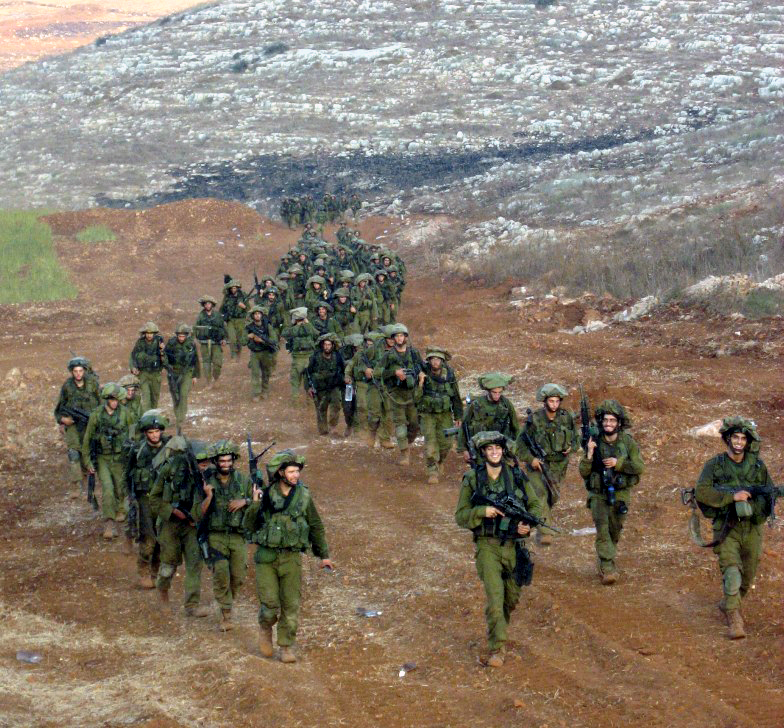
Israeli soldiers of the Nahal Brigade withdrawing from Lebanon

What became known in Israel as the Battle of Wadi Saluki is called the Battle of Wadi al-Hujeir in Lebanon. Wadi as-Sulouqi originates in the area of Bint Jubeil and runs north several kilometers west of the Israel-Lebanon border until it turns west near the town of at-Tayyiba. The wadi is renamed Wadi al-Hujeir when it meets the western contributory and turns north before it joins the Litani River near the Qa'qa'iya bridge. The area was the obvious route of any Israeli attempt to cut south Lebanon off at the Litani river. Both the Israeli invasions in 1978 and 1982 passed through this area.

From the first days of the war, Israel bombed the small Christian village of al-Ghandouriya, situated near the wadi crossing, forcing the inhabitants to evacuate their homes. Israel usually did not attack Christian villages for no good reason and for Hizbullah it was clear that the Israeli army intended to pass this way. Several attempted Israeli incursions in the area reinforced this impression. The only question was whether it would take the form of a helicopter landing behind Hizbullah lines or an armored advance from the border. Hizbullah thus reinforced its forces in the area. It took up positions in the vacated villages and started preparing ambushes.

General Tzur had twice sent the brigade’s engineering battalion to secure a foothold on the western bank of the wadi near the village of al-Ghandouriya, in preparation for the rapid sweep westwards towards the city of Tyre. In both cases the Israeli forces were called back for unclear reasons. In both cases the Israeli forces were attacked by anti-tank missiles but for some reason these reports never reached their superiors. Hizbullah claims to have repulsed the Israeli attacks.

The battle was initiated by a large helicopter lift of infantry from the Nahal Brigade in the vicinity of the villages of al-Ghandouriya and Furoun to the west of the wadi. The Infantry was supposed to clear the ground for the advancing tanks but somehow failed in their mission.

A column of 24 Merkava tanks from the 401st Brigade advanced westward from the area of Tayyiba and when it entered the wadi, it was attacked from all sides, including from the rear near Odaisseh that had been thought to have been under IDF control for several days. The Hizbullah had prepared an ambush from hidden positions on the hilltops. The tanks were attacked by missiles, probably of the Kornet type. Eleven of the tanks were hit and several went up in flames. Eight tankers, including two company commanders, and four Nahal infantry men died in the initial battle of Sulouqi. Hizbullah fighters used ATGMs, small-arms fire, and mortars to suppress the Nahal Brigade, preventing them from providing effective infantry support for the armor forces. Timur Göksel, the former chief spokesperson for UNIFIL later commented that "anyone dumb enough to push a tank column through Wadi Saluki should not be an armored brigade commander but a cook."

The division proved unable to open the route across the wadi. Early morning August 13 another tank battalion reported having crossed the wadi successfully but the sweep west was cancelled. No further offensive action was taken on this front. Four IDF infantry soldiers were killed only hours before the cease-fire on the eastern bank of Wadi al-Hujeir. They were killed by an anti-tank rocket fired at them while operating in the village of Qantara. Among those killed in the clash were Uri Grossman, the son of Israeli author David Grossman.

A total of 17 Israeli soldiers died in the eastern sector during Operation Change of Direction 11.

According to the IDF, around 80 Hizbullah fighters were killed in the battle of Wadi Saluki. The IDF claimed it lost 12 soldiers. This estimate seemed to have been based on battle damage assessments from the large number of cluster munitions the IDF used in the final days of the war. Captain Daniel Helmer of the US army commented that "as in much of the war, Hezbollah’s dead proved as elusive as its living fighters. " Lebanese sources claimed that nine Hizbullah fighters were killed during the battles of al-Ghandouriya and Wadi Saluki. According to the Hizbullah version, seven Hizbullah fighters and their commander Rani Adnan Bazzi were killed while fighting a close-quarters battle with IDF troops in al-Ghandourriya. Another three were wounded. One wounded fighter was taken prisoner by Israeli soldiers. He woke up at Poriya hospital in Tiberias and was eventually released in the prisoner exchange in 2008. Hizbullah claimed to have lost only one fighter at Wadi al-Hujeir, and identified him as Ali Salih, a commander. Salih was severely wounded by an Israeli drone strike and died of his injuries in a hospital twenty days later. According to the official Hizbullah version of events, Salih fought singlehandedly at Wadi al-Hujeir, running between pre-positioned Kornet missile sites and firing at the Israeli tanks before finally being hit. Hizbullah claimed that all of the Israeli tanks destroyed at Wadi al-Hujeir were destroyed by Salih.

The planned westward sweep towards the coast never materialized. Guy Zur, commander of Division 162, apparently was "astonished” and told the press that Hizbullah was the "world’s best guerrilla group".

== Aftermath ==
Operation Changing Direction 11 was meant to be "a large, broad ground operation, which would fundamentally alter reality in Southern Lebanon and the image of the operation in the military sense." After the heavy casualties in battles of Sulouqi/al-Hujeir and Bmaryamin plain landings Operation Change of Direction 11 "faded away on its own", the illusions of the Israeli leadership "imploded" and its only concern was how to end the war as quickly as possible. According to a Knesset inquiry "Israel did not succeed in defeating the enemy, which is made up of only a couple of thousands." The Israeli government therefore, August 13, accepted a ceasefire in accordance with the UN Security Council Resolution 1701.

In spite of the ceasefire only taking effect in the morning of August 14, the IDF had stopped most offensive actions already by the night 12 August, or early morning of August 13. According to Harel and Issacharoff operation Change of Direction 11 was a "gargantuan failure" that "failed to meet its objectives". Most of the divisions did not reach the sectors that were earmarked for them. Katyusha fire was not reduced. On the last day of the war more than 250 rockets were fired on Israel. On the same day Israeli TV filmed a Katyusha being fired from a village next to Metulla, less than a kilometer from the border.

Israel supplied the United Nations a map of the 16 pockets and sectors the IDF was occupying in south Lebanon and expressed "its desire to withdraw its forces from all of the sectors as quickly as possible." The IDF feared that its soldiers would become "sitting ducks for guerilla actions". However, no such actions took place. In some minor clashes six Hizbullah militants were allegedly killed by the IDF, but there was no large-scale violations of the U.N.-brokered cease-fire. Also, Israeli forces did not respond to rockets fired by Hizbullah during the night of 15 August, as none of them crossed into Northern Israel. At the time of the cease-fire more than 20 damaged Israeli tanks and armored vehicles were left stranded inside Lebanese territory and the IDF was working hard to bring them back to Israel. Due to the difficulties in removing them the army was considering bombing them from the air "so as not to allow Hizbullah terrorists to wave their flags over them after the war." After the ceasefire was signed, Israel started to withdraw from its forward positions and handed them over to the Lebanese Army and UNIFIL. Israel completed the withdrawal within the start of October.

In the last three days of the war 34 Israeli soldiers were killed and 447 were wounded while 1 civilian was killed and 157 civilians were wounded. The main objective of the operation, the reduction of the missile attacks on Israeli north, was not accomplished. According to Israeli statistics over 400 missiles were fired in the last three days of the war.

General Tzur held a press conference lauding the accomplishments of the IDF in the Sulouqi crossing. Some of the present reporters questioned what exactly was gained in the battle. "Let’s take a look at it. Immediately after crossing the obstacle with considerable losses, you ordered a halt. And now, there’s a cease-fire and the IDF is going to pull out of the forward positions that it captured, so what the hell did the soldiers die for?" Tzur refused to answer the question and referred it to his superiors.

According to Haaretz an anonymous "highly placed" American official, Operation Changing Direction 11 significantly affected the text of the UNSCR 1701 in favor of Israel. Later Haaretz learned that the Israeli government had received the final version of the resolution before the final operation was launched. Ministry document shows only slight variations in resolution drafts that Olmert used to authorize ground raid. United States UN ambassador John Bolton denied that the Security Council negotiations were affected by the events on the ground. In fact the implementation of the operation was postponed for two days in anticipation of the negotiations in the Security Council. It was finally initiated in the evening of August 11 only hours before the Security Council approved of the resolution calling for a ceasefire.

Resolution 1701 called for the "disarmament of all armed groups" in Lebanon in accordance with the Taif Accords, and of Security Council resolutions 1559 (2004) and 1680 (2006). Hizbullah accepted a ceasefire but did not accept to be disarmed until the last Israeli occupation soldier had left Lebanese territory. That included according to Hizbullah the Shebaa farms occupied by Israel in the 1967 war and this position was supported by the Lebanese government.

To avoid future conflicts with the UNIFIL a compromise agreement was hammered out between Hizbullah and the Lebanese government that Hizbullah weapons south on the Litani had to be kept hidden. Lebanon's Defense Minister Elias Murr denied that the Lebanese army would disarm Hizbullah. "The army is not going to the south to strip Hezbollah of weapons and do the work Israel did not."

Prime Minister Ehud Olmert, however, stated that if Hizbullah did not disarm, Israel would continue with what he termed "a long, hard, arduous, complex fight."

According to a survey done after the ceasefire, only 3 percent of Israelis believed that the country achieved most or all of its pre-war objectives while 58 percent believed that Israel achieved few if any objectives in the war. Only six percent of respondents said they thought the Security Council resolution was good, against 66 percent who thought it was not good. A full 38 percent said the deal was not good but Israel had no choice but to accept it.

Former chief of staff Moshe Ya'alon dismissed Operation Change of Direction 11 as a "spin move": "It had no substantive security-political goal, only a spin goal. It was meant to supply the missing victory picture. You don't do that. You don't send soldiers to carry out a futile mission after the political outcome has already been set. I consider that corrupt."

Military analyst and IDF reserve officer Ron Tira writes that "the fact that several hundred Hizbollah fighters faced up to four Israeli divisions and the Israel Air Force, and ended the war standing up after inflicting significant damage on IDF forces, may also generate indirect results that are at best problematic."

Following the end of the war, Hizbullah started building a new defensive line north of the Litani river.

== Israel Defense Forces fatalities ==
Aug 11, 2006

- Sgt.-Maj.(res.) Aharon Yehezkel, 32, of Kfar Yedidya

Aug 12, 2006

- Capt. Shai Bernstein (9th bat. of the 401st Armored Brigade), 24, of Beersheva
- St.-Sgt. Amsa (Ami) Meshulami (9th bat. of the 401st Armored Brigade), 20, of Ofra
- St.-Sgt. Ido Grabovsky (9th bat. of the 401st Armored Brigade), 20, of Rosh Ha'ayin
- St.-Sgt. Tzahi Krips (Nahal Brigade), 20, of Kibbutz Hama'apil
- St.-Sgt. Itai Steinberger (Reconnaissance company of the 401st Armored Brigade), 21, of Karmei Yosef
- Sgt. Yaniv Tamerson, Tank Commander, (52nd bat. of the 401st Armored Brigade), 21, of Tzipori
- Cpl. Ya'ar Ben Giat (Nahal Brigate), 19, of Nahsholim
- Sgt. Yohann Zerbib (Nahal Brigate), 22, of Tel Aviv
- Capt. Benaya Rein, Tank Commander (46th bat. of the 401st Armored Brigade), 27, of Karnei Shomron
- St.-Sgt. Adam Goren (46th bat. of the 401st Armored Brigade), 21, of Kibbutz Ma'abarot
- Sgt. Alexander Bonimovitch (46th bat. of the 401st Armored Brigade), 19, of Netanya
- St.-Sgt. Uri Grossman (46th bat. of the 401st Armored Brigade), 20, of Mevaseret Zion
- Sgt. Yosef Abitbol (Golani Brigade), 19, of Gan Ner
- Cpl. Tomer Amar (Golani Brigade), 19, of Julis
- Sgt. Yonatan Ankonina (Golani Brigade), 21, of Netanya
- St.-Sgt. Oz Zemah, Tank Commander (53rd bat. of the 188th armored brigade), 20, of Maccabim-Reut
- Sgt. Haran Lev (53rd bat. of the 188th armored brigade), 20, of Kibbutz Ma'ayan Barukh
- Sgt. Dan Breuer (53rd bat. of the 188th armored brigade), 19, of Beit Hillel
- Cpl. Yigal Nissan (53rd bat. of the 188th armored brigade), 19, of Ma'ale Adumim
- Maj. Sami Ben-Naim (Helicopter pilot), 39, of Rehovot
- Maj.(res) Nissan Shalev (Helicopter pilot), 36, of Kibbutz Evron
- Capt. Daniel Gomez (Helicopter crew), 25, of Nehalim
- Warr.Ofc.(res.) Ron Mashiah (Helicopter crew), 33, of Gedera
- Sgt.-Maj. Keren Tendler (Helicopter crew), 26, of Rehovot

Aug 13, 2006

- Lt.(res.) Tzur Zarhi (434th Armored Brigade), 27, of Moshav Nahalal
- St.-Sgt.(res.) David Amar, 24, of Kiryat Shmona
- St.-Sgt.-Maj.(res.) Amitai Yaron, 44, of Zichron Ya'akov
- St.-Sgt. Peter Ochotzky, 23, of Lod
- St.-Sgt. Evgeny Timofeev, 20, of Rishon Lezion
- Lt.(res.) Eliel Ben-Yehuda (Carmeli Brigade), 24, of Kfar Tavor
- Sgt.-Maj.(res.) Guy Hasson (Carmeli Brigade), 24, of Moshav Na'ama
- St.-Sgt.(res.) Yaniv Shainbrum (Carmeli Brigade), 24, of Mei Ami
- St.-Sgt.(res.) Elad Shlomo Ram (Carmeli Brigade), 31, of Haifa

== Fatalities of Hezbollah in al-Ghandouriya and Wadi al-Hujeir (partial) ==
- Ali Khalil al-Husein
- Rani Adnan Bazzi (commander)
- Imad Hassan Qudouh
- Mustafa Kamal Rakin
- Fadi Ahmad Abbas
- Shadi Ahmad Abbas
- Ali Hassan Hamu
- Hassan Abdul-Amir Mar’i
- Ali Mahmoud Salih (commander)

== Hezbollah prisoners ==
- Khadr Zaydan

== Sources ==
- Arkin, William M. (August 2007). Divining Victory: Airpower in the 2006 Israel-Hezbollah War (PDF). Maxwell Air Force Base, Alabama: Air University Press.
- Erlich, Dr. Reuven (Col. Ret.), "Hezbollah's use of Lebanese civilians as human shields", Intelligence and Terrorism Information Center at the Center for Special Studies (C.S.S), November 2006. [The study was supported by Military Intelligence, the Operations Division of the IDF General Staff, the IDF Spokesperson and the legal experts of the IDF and the Ministry of Foreign Affairs.]
- Farquhar, Lieutenant Colonel Scott C. (2009). BACK TO BASICS, A Study of the Second Lebanon War and Operation CAST LEAD (PDF). Fort Leavenworth, Kansas: Combat Studies Institute Press, US Army Combined Arms Center. Archived from the original on April 8, 2013.
- Harel, Amos; Issacharoff, Avi (2008). 34 Days: Israel, Hezbollah, and the War in Lebanon. New York: Palgrave Macmillan.
- Matthews, Matt M. (2006). We Were Caught Unprepared: The 2006 Hezbollah-Israeli War (PDF). The Long War Series Occasional Paper 26, U.S. Army Combined Arms Center Combat Studies Institute Press Fort Leavenworth, Kansas. Archived from the original (PDF) on November 7, 2010.
- Kober, Avi (2008). The Israel Defense Forces in the Second Lebanon War: Why the Poor Performance?. The Journal of Strategic Studies Vol. 31, No. 1, 3 – 40.
- The final Winograd Commission report (Hebrew)
