= Abu Shusha =

Abu Shusha أبو شوشة
- Etymology: Father of the top-knots
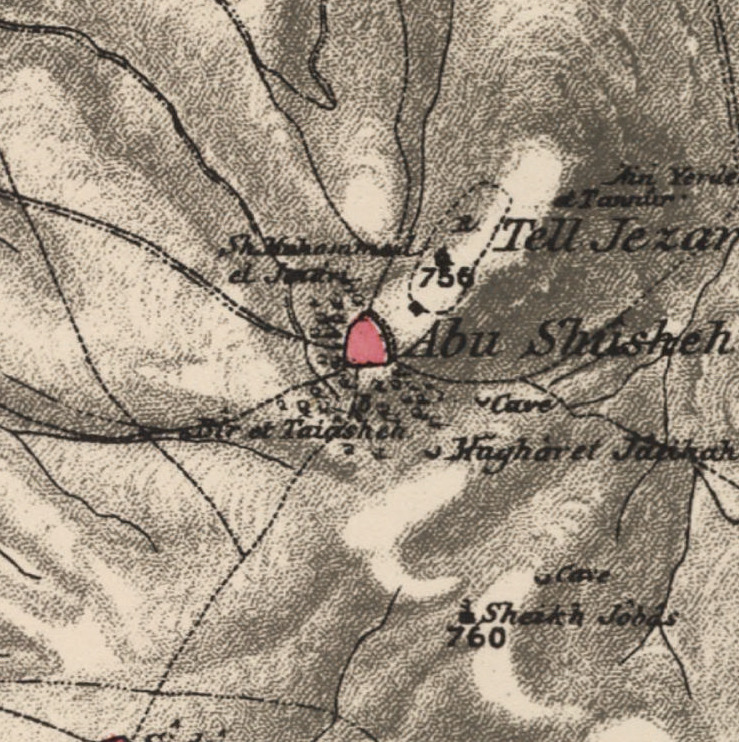
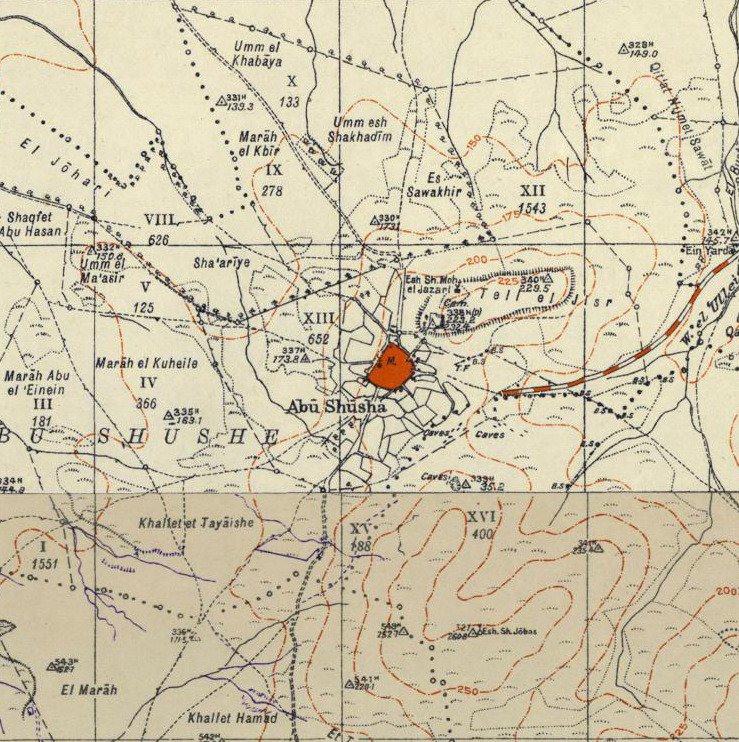
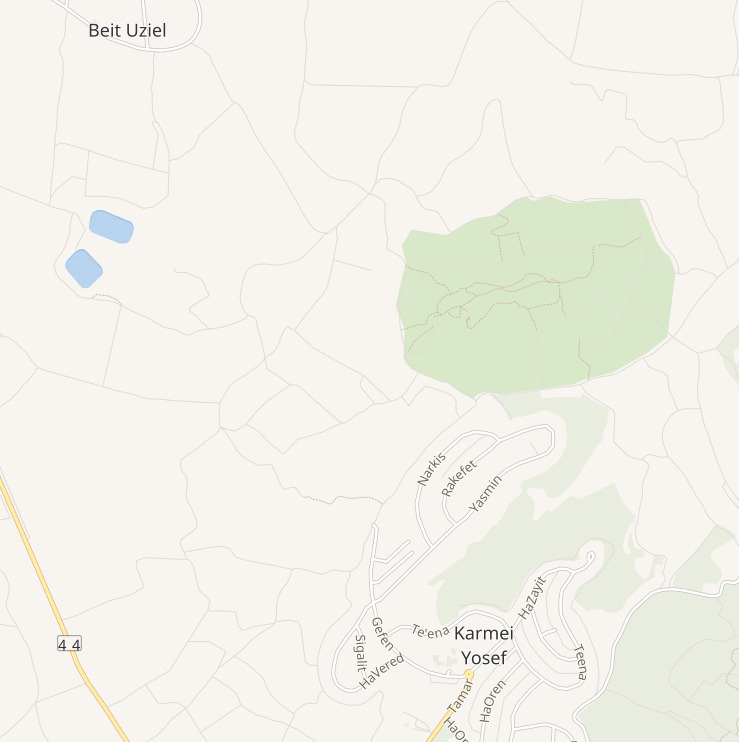
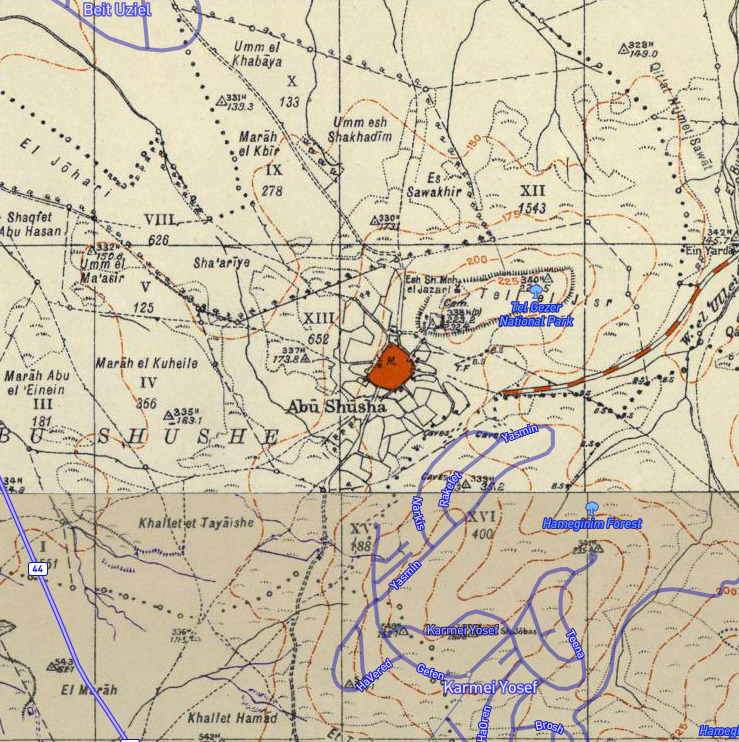
- 1870s map 1940s map modern map 1940s with modern overlay map A series of historical maps of the area around Abu Shusha (click the buttons)

- Location within Mandatory Palestine
- Coordinates: 31°51′25″N 34°54′56″E
- Palestine grid: 142/140
- Geopolitical entity: Mandatory Palestine
- Subdistrict: Ramle
- Date of depopulation: 14 May 1948

Area
  - Total: 9.4 km^{2} (3.6 sq mi)

Population (1945)
  - Total: 870−950−870
- Cause(s) of depopulation: Military assault by Yishuv forces
- Current Localities: Ameilim, Pedaya

Abu Shusha (Arabic: أبو شوشة) was a Palestinian Arab village in the Ramle Subdistrict of Mandatory Palestine, located 8 km southeast of Ramle. It was ethnically cleansed in May 1948.

Abu Shusha was located on the slope of Tell Jezer/Tell el-Jazari, which is commonly identified with the ancient city of Gezer. In April–May 1948, during the 1948 Arab–Israeli War, Abu Shusha was attacked several times. The final assault began on May 13, one day prior to Israel's declaration of independence. Abu Shusha residents attempted to defend the village, but the village was occupied on May 14. The civilians who had not already fled or been killed were expelled by May 21. With their descendants, they numbered about 6,198 in 1998.

== Name ==
Abu Shusheh is said to derive its name from a derwish who prayed for rain in a time of drought, and was told by a sand-diviner that he would perish if it came. The water came out of the earth (probably at Et Tannur) and formed a pool, into which he stepped and was drowned. The people, seeing only his topknot left, cried Ya Abu Shusheh ("Oh Father of the Topknot").

== History ==
The Crusaders called the place Mont Gisart. In 1177 the Crusaders won a battle against Saladin there. Ceramics and coins from the 13th century have been found here.

=== Ottoman era ===
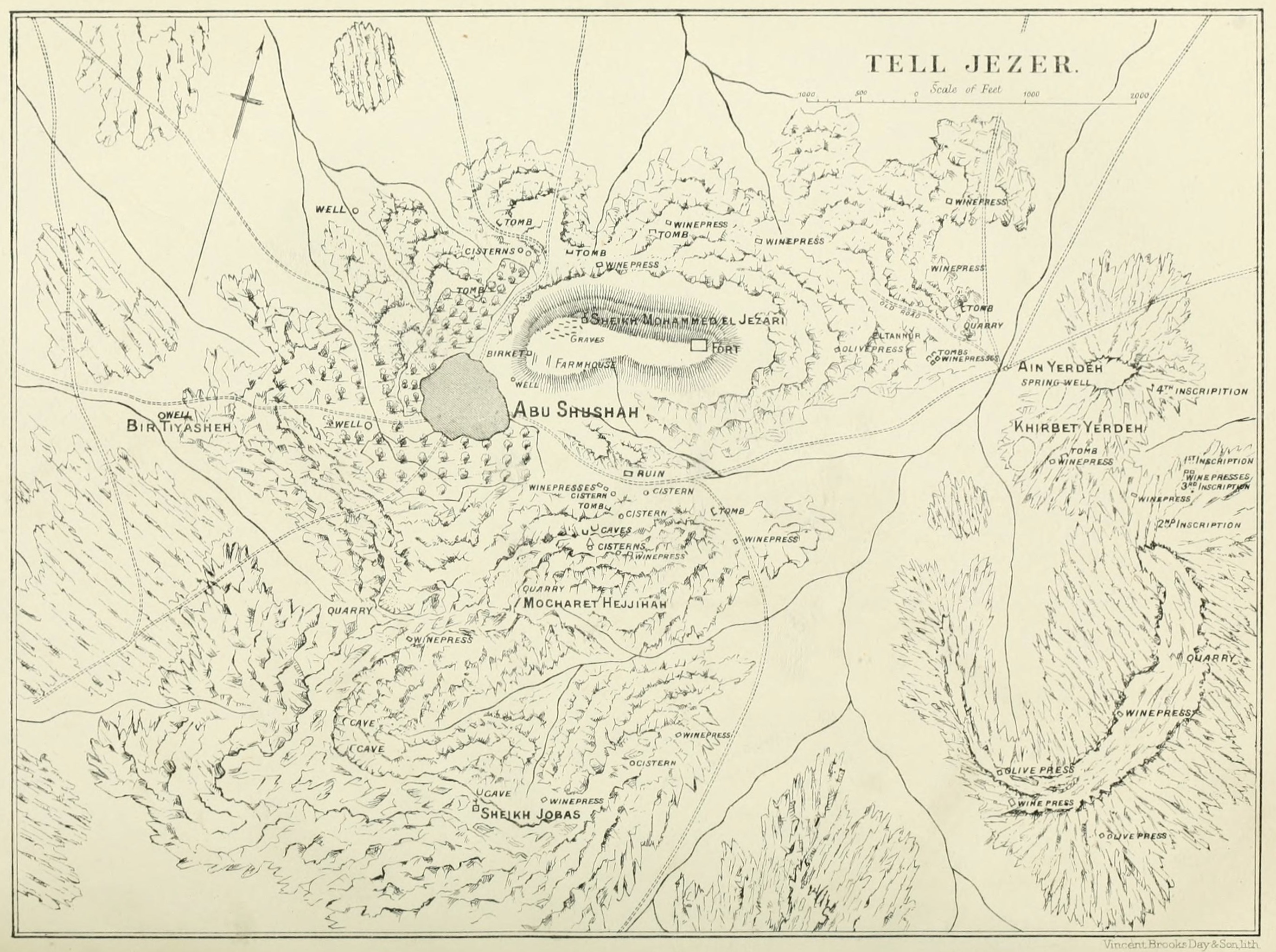
Abu Shusha in the 1871-77 PEF Survey of Palestine

A Maqam (shrine) was built there possibly in the 16th century. In 1838, Abu Shusheh was noted as a Muslim village in the Ibn Humar area in the District of Er-Ramleh. Edward Robinson also noted the village on his travels in the region in 1852.

In 1869 or 1872, the village lands were purchased by Melville Peter Bergheim of Jerusalem, a Protestant of German origin. Bergheim established a modern agricultural farm, using European methods and equipment. Bergheim's ownership of the land was hotly contested by the villagers, by legal and illegal means, including the murder of Bergheim's son Peter on 12 October 1885. After the Bergheim company went bankrupt in 1892, Abu Shusa's lands were managed by a government receiver.

In 1882, the PEF's Survey of Western Palestine (SWP) noted that the extent of land farmed by Mr. Bergheim at Abu Shusheh was 5,000 acres. The boundaries was shown on the Survey's map as a dotted line: ____ . . . . _____ . . . . SWP further described Abu Shusha as a small village built of stone and adobe and surrounded by cactus hedges, populated by about 100 families.

Elihu Grant, who visited the village, described it as "tiny" in 1907. In 1910s, part of the land was sold by the government receiver to the villagers and the rest to the Jewish Colonization Association, which gave the villagers one third of their purchase in order to settle the dispute. After World War I, the land in Jewish hands was sold to the Maccabean Land Company, and later transferred to the Jewish National Fund.

In November, 1917, the British 6th Mounted Brigade charged a Turkish detachment defending the heights above Abu Shusheh. The Turks suffered 'heavy casualties'.

=== British Mandate era ===
In the 1922 census of Palestine conducted by the British Mandate authorities, Abu Shusheh had a population of 603 residents; all Muslims, increasing in the 1931 census to 627, still all Muslims, in a total of 145 houses.

The village had a mosque and a number of shops. A village school was founded in 1947, with an initial enrollment of 33 students.

In the 1945 statistics the population of Abu Shusha was 870, all Muslims, with a total land area of 9,425 dunams. 2,475 dunums of village land were allotted to cereals, 54 dunums were irrigated or used for orchards, while 24 dunams were built-up (urban) areas.

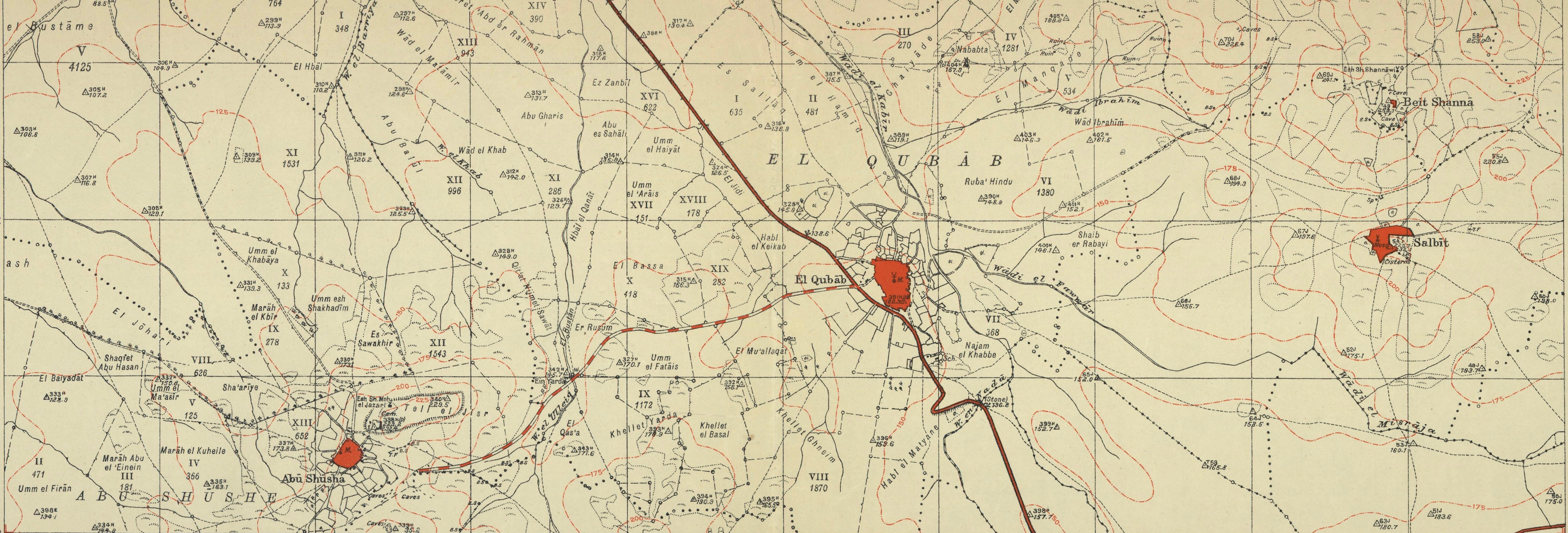
Abu Shusha 1942 1:20,000

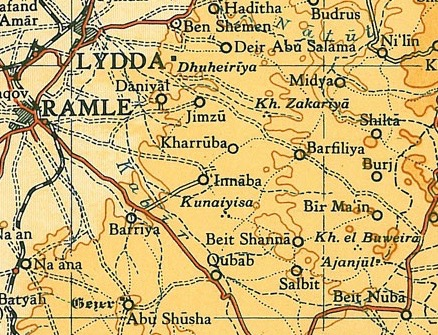
Abu Shusha 1945 Scale 1:250,000

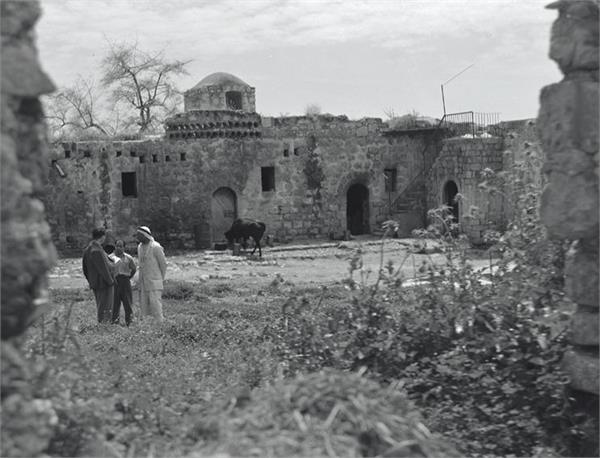
Abu Shusha 1945

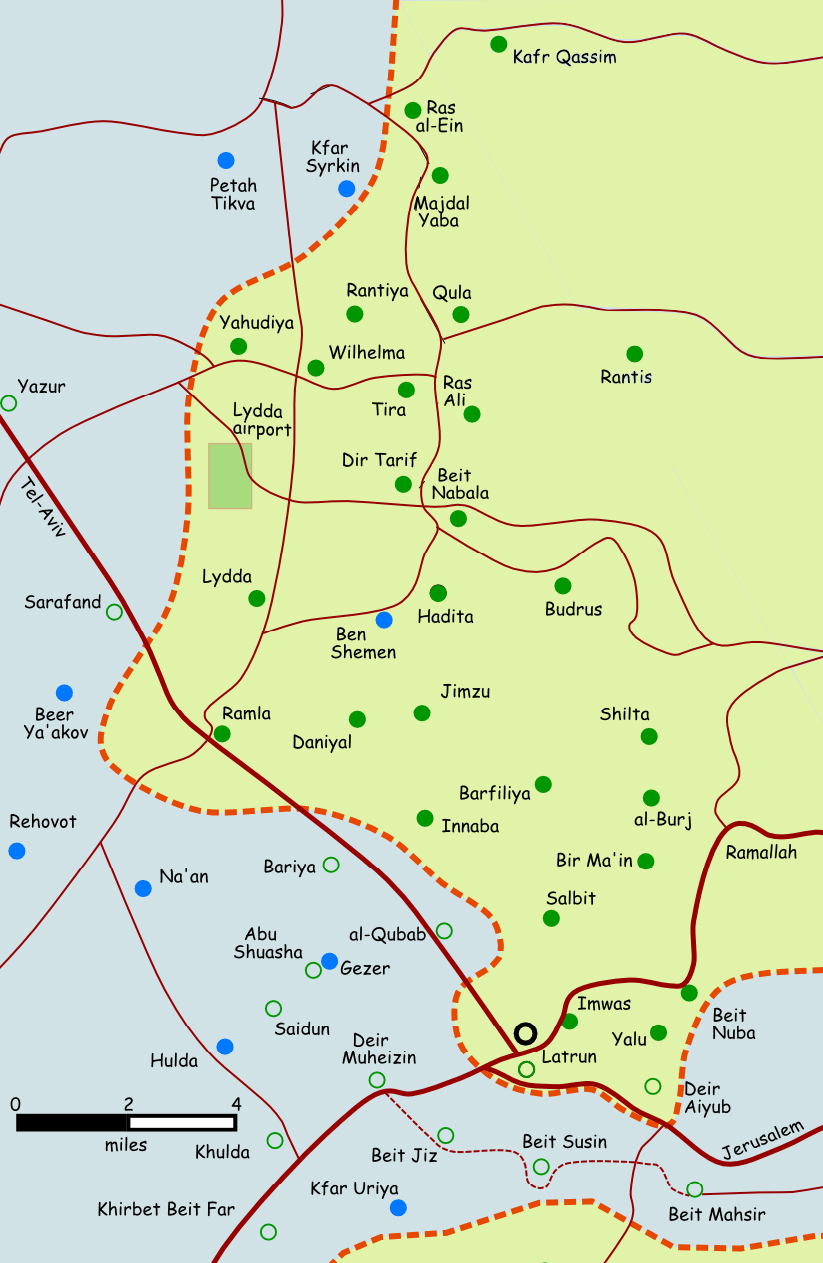
Depopulated villages in the Ramle Subdistrict 9 July 1948

=== 1948 massacre and aftermath ===
The village was attacked by the Givati Brigade on May 13–14, 1948 during Operation Barak. A few inhabitants fled but most remained. The Givati troops were immediately replaced by militia men from kibbutz Gezer, who were later replaced by troops from Kiryati Brigade. On May 19, Arab Legion sources claimed that villagers were being killed. On May 21, Arab authorities appealed to the Red Cross to stop "barbaric acts" they said were being committed in Abu Shusha. A Haganah soldier was reported to have twice attempted to rape a 20-year-old female prisoner. The residents that had remained in the village were expelled, apparently on 21 May.

More recent research, including that conducted by Birzeit University, suggests that around 60 residents were massacred by the Givati Brigade during the attack. In 1995 a mass grave with 52 skeletons was discovered, but their cause of death is undetermined.

The Israeli settlement of Ameilim was founded nearby later in 1948, while Pedaya was established in 1951; both on village land. The remains of the village were destroyed in 1965 as part of a government operation to clear the country of abandoned villages, which were regarded by the Israel Land Administration as "a blot on the landscape".

In 1992 the village site was described: "The Israeli settlement of Ameilim occupies much of the site. Figs and cypress trees, cactuses and one palm tree grow on the site. The surrounding valleys are planted in apricots and figs, and various kinds of fruit trees are cultivated on the heights."

== See also ==
- Al-Barriyya

== Bibliography ==
- Barron, J.B., ed. (1923). Palestine: Report and General Abstracts of the Census of 1922. Government of Palestine.
- Benvenisti, M. (1996). City of Stone: The Hidden History of Jerusalem. University of California Press. ISBN 978-0-520-91868-9.
- Bruce, Anthony (2002). The Last Crusade: The Palestine Campaign in the First World War. On Demand Publishing. ISBN 1909609048.
- Conder, C.R.; Kitchener, H.H. (1882). The Survey of Western Palestine: Memoirs of the Topography, Orography, Hydrography, and Archaeology. Vol. 2. London: Committee of the Palestine Exploration Fund.
- Government of Palestine, Department of Statistics (1945). Village Statistics, April, 1945.
- Grant, E. (1907). The Peasantry of Palestine. Boston, New York [etc.]: The Pilgrim Press.
- Hadawi, S. (1970). Village Statistics of 1945: A Classification of Land and Area ownership in Palestine. Palestine Liberation Organization Research Center. Archived from the original on 2018-12-08.
- Khalidi, W. (1992). All That Remains: The Palestinian Villages Occupied and Depopulated by Israel in 1948. Washington D.C.: Institute for Palestine Studies. ISBN 0-88728-224-5.
- Mills, E., ed. (1932). Census of Palestine 1931. Population of Villages, Towns and Administrative Areas. Jerusalem: Government of Palestine.
- Morris, B. (2004). The Birth of the Palestinian Refugee Problem Revisited. Cambridge University Press. ISBN 978-0-521-00967-6.
- Palmer, E.H. (1881). The Survey of Western Palestine: Arabic and English Name Lists Collected During the Survey by Lieutenants Conder and Kitchener, R. E. Transliterated and Explained by E.H. Palmer. Committee of the Palestine Exploration Fund.
- Robinson, E.; Smith, E. (1841). Biblical Researches in Palestine, Mount Sinai and Arabia Petraea: A Journal of Travels in the year 1838. Vol. 3. Boston: Crocker & Brewster.
- Robinson, E.; Smith, E. (1856). Later Biblical Researches in Palestine and adjacent regions: A Journal of Travels in the year 1852. London: John Murray.
