= Latrun salient =

Territory in the West Bank

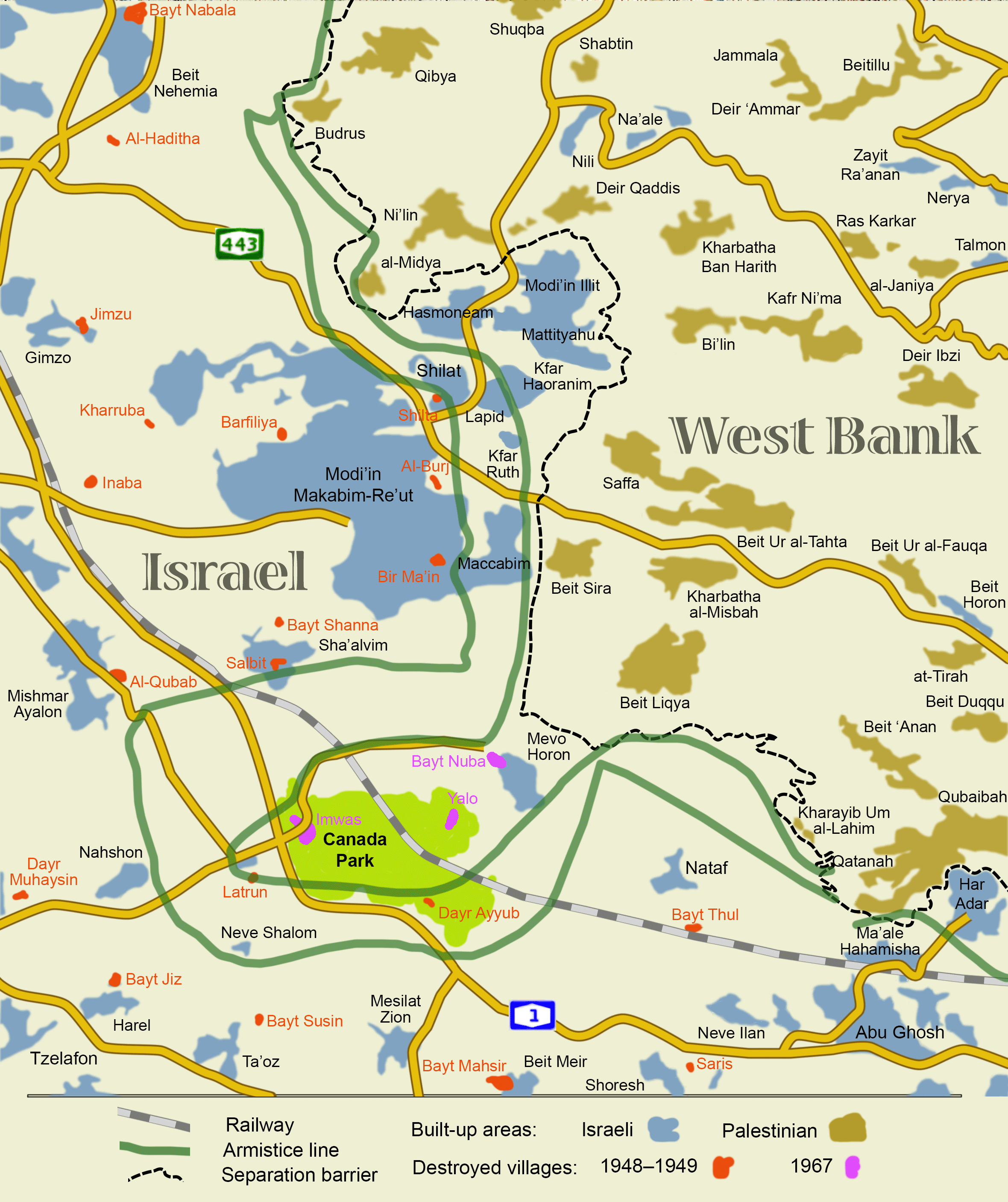
The Latrun region in Israel and Palestine

The Latrun salient is an area of the West Bank that protrudes into Israeli territory. It is surrounded by a strip of territory covering 46.4 square kilometres (17.9 sq mi), (Note: The figure of 38.2 km² given in some sources reflects the Israeli negotiating position for areas they wish to annex by consent after peace negotiations (Djerejian 2010, p. 23).) that has the formal status of a no man's land (NML) between Israel and Palestine. Israel considers the NML a part of its state, while Palestinians regard it as part of the West Bank.

== Background ==
The region consists of hills and an arable plain that historically was owned and cultivated for centuries by Palestinian fellahin. It forms a crucial junction between Jaffa and Jerusalem. Its importance as a strategic transit area was recognized by the military authorities of Mandatory Palestine who built a formidable Tegart fortress on a hilltop site there. The United Nations Partition Plan for Palestine assigned the region to a future Arab state. Throughout the ensuing 1948 Arab–Israeli War, Jordan's Arab Legion managed to maintain control of the terrain overlooked by the Tegart fort and the Trappist Latrun monastery despite fierce attempts by Israel forces to gain possession. In the immediate aftermath of the war, as a result of the Armistice agreement drawn up the following year, the area was demarcated by two lines reflecting the respective positions of the two armies at the time of the ceasefire, with the land between the lines defined as no man's land, controlled by neither party,. The lands of the village of Dayr Ayyub, conquered and depopulated by Israel in 1948 also fell within this area. (Note: "the village core fell within no man's land. After the 1967 war and Israel's occupation of the West Bank, the Israeli army destroyed the remaining villages located in the Latrun area, and in 1973 Canada Park was established mainly on land belonging to 'Imwas and Yalu villages and partially to Dayr Ayyub, including the village core and significant expanses of landscape surrounding the village." (Issa 2020, p. 96))

== 1949–1967 ==
Over the following nineteen-year period, both sides endeavoured to wrest control by extending their respective agricultural activities in parts of the contested zone, while recognising the autonomy of the monastery, which lay under the protection and patronage of France. Both parties agreed in an extraparliamentary accord, operative from 7 June 1951, to allow an exception for the Trappist monks, whose land holding extends over 1,000 dunams and who were permitted to harvest their vineyards in no man's land. During this period, Israeli kibbutzim adjacent to the Green Line managed to put some 600 hectares under cultivation, while Palestinian farmers extended their use over 50 hectares, with both sides planting these areas with yearly cereal crops while refraining from planting orchards or olive groves, or building any structures. Talks to expand Israel's borders when Levi Eshkol assumed the Prime Ministership in 1963 led to a variety of plans, one of which, code-named Mozart, envisaged "grabs" of territory like Latrun. Occasionally these encroachments led to open conflict as with the two-day "Tractors war" in October 1965, which led to a formal complaint on 1 November by Jordan before the United Nations. The Jordanians submitted that on 30 October an incursion took place within the no man's land zone consisting of a sortie of 24 tractors under full IDF military escort. Alerted the UN observers requested a complete withdrawal, which only met an Israeli response of sending further reinforcements. Israel, the following day, stated to the UN that both sides had indulged in movements of this kind, and that the problem was to be resolved through the usual Armistice regulatory machinery.

== 1967–present ==
The order to seize the Latrun area came from Moshe Dayan late in the evening of day one of the Six-Day War. IDF military units began their operation at midnight and had secured their aims by 4 a.m. There was no Jordanian opposition, since the Jordanian garrison, aware it was undermanned in Latrun, had shifted troops stationed there to Jerusalem, regarding the defense of that city as their priority. Three Palestinian villages of Bayt Nuba, Imwas/Emmaus and Yalo bordering on the no man's land were razed and 12,000 inhabitants of the area expelled eastwards, while the cultivable land was handed over to nearby kibbutzim. On Israeli maps since then, both the Armistice line and the no man's land enclave have disappeared. (Note: "In the Latrun area, the direct visual translation of political reality since the 1967 Israeli occupation can be analyzed effortlessly; the no man's land and the 1949 Armistice line have disappeared. The names of the five Palestinian villages and built up areas had already disappeared as direct representation due to the erasure and demolition on the ground, especially in June 1967 by Israeli army. The route of the Jaffa-Jerusalem road was shifted north inside the no man's land. Recent map versions show hidden lines indicating the underground route of the recently established high speed train between Tel Aviv and Jerusalem. The 'cartographic blob' of Latrun area that resulted from the 1949 Armistice line had already been swallowed" (Issa 2020, p. 114).) (Note: "Israel has built on either side of the Green Line and deleted it from textbooks and weather maps. Israeli drivers plying the main Tel Aviv-Jerusalem highway crisscross the unmarked line at the Latrun Interchange every second of the day, slicing through half a mile of West Bank territory and several more miles of no man's land, oblivious to the area's fraught history." (Kershner 2011)) The area was declared a closed military zone, with substantial parts transformed into the national Canada Park. The Separation Barrier built eastwards now folds the entire Latrun enclave within the Israeli side of the fence. The settlement of Mevo Horon, established in 1970, is now said to mark the separation of the Latrun enclave from the rest of the West Bank. Four other settlements were established in the NML, Kfar Ruth, Lapid, Maccabim and Shilat (which is also partially in Israel). The Israeli-Palestinian village of Neve Shalom, founded on a project of creating a model for Israeli-Palestinian communities, was also established in the NML, cultivating land partially leased from the Catholic authorities. Israeli municipal jurisdiction was extended over these five settlements. By 2010 1,200 Israeli settlers had established homes in the area. The Tel Aviv–Jerusalem railway runs underneath the area. (Note: "When the Israeli military planning committee discussed objections filed by the Palestinian land owners in July of 2005, alternative routes to the A1 train route included one option further south, through the Ayalon Valley, within the borders of the State of Israel. The committee decided to dismiss this option because of possible environmental harm to the Ayalon Valley." (WhoProfits 2017))

=== Peace negotiations ===
In 1949 Abdallah offered Israel the Jewish quarter of Jerusalem and withdrawal from the strategic Latrun area in return for the Israeli-held Qatamon quarter of Jerusalem and the repatriation of Lydda and Ramle refugees. According to Raja Shehadeh, Israeli effectively annexed the area of no man's land in 1967. No such formal act of annexation exists however. In peace negotiations, according to Gideon Biger, the Israeli position has been that they retain as sovereign property half of the NML, while the other half, while belonging to Palestinians, should remain part of Israel, and the Palestinians compensated for its loss by accepting an area of similar dimensions elsewhere. A variant of Abdallah 1's land-trade offer resurfaced in 1978 as peace talks between Israel and Egypt were underway. Jordan expressed a willingness to renounce their claims on the Latrun area in exchange for the Israeli spur that once truncated the main Bethlehem-Jerusalem road. Israel has proposed annexing some 38.2 km^{2} of the area. The Palestinian viewpoint rebuffs this as constituting a gratuitous appropriation of a substantial amount of uninhabited Palestinian land, with no settlers or settlements, and asserts the primacy of re-establishing the three villages that were removed and whose population was expelled.

=== Legal status ===
The strips of territory known as no man's land in the Latrun and Jerusalem regions were among the territories occupied by Israel following the 1967 war. According to B'tselem, the territory is not considered to be occupied under international law. However, the United Nations and the European Union consider Israeli localities in the Latrun no man's land to be illegal settlements.

== Sources ==
- Ahren, Raphael (1 August 2018). "Switzerland to hold reception in no-man's land between Israel, West Bank". The Times of Israel.
- Alzoughbi, Basheer (2019). "The Relocation of the U.S. Embassy from Tel Aviv to Jerusalem (Palestine v United States of America) a Commentary on the Merits of the Case, Jurisdiction of the International Court of Justice and Admissibility of Palestine's Application". University of Bologna Law Review. 4 (1): 114–205. doi:10.6092/issn.2531-6133/9425.
- Auerbach, Shakked (8 July 2017). "No One Knows Actually Where Israel Where Israel Ends and the Palestinian Territories Begin". Haaretz.
- Ben-Dror, Elad (November 2021). "The Armistice Talks between Israel and Jordan, 1949: The View from Rhodes". Middle Eastern Studies. 48 (6): 879–902. doi:10.1080/00263206.2012.723625. JSTOR 41721187. S2CID 144747373.
- Biger, Gideon (2016). "Latrun – A No Man's Land in Israel" (PDF). The European Journal of Geopolitics. 4: 122–131.
- "Crossing the Line The Tel Aviv Jerusalem Fast Train (A1): Flash report". Who Profits?. July 2017.
- Djerejian, Edward P (2 February 2010). "Getting to the Territorial Endgame of an Israeli-Palestinian Peace Settlement" (PDF). James A. Baker III Institute for Public Policy. pp. 879–902.
- Frantzman, Seth; Kark, Ruth (May 2014). "The Catholic Church in Palestine/Israel: Real Estate in "Terra Sancta"". Middle Eastern Studies. 50 (3): 370–396. doi:10.1080/00263206.2013.871266. JSTOR 24583548. S2CID 144958547.
- Greenway, H. D. S. (2 March 1978). "Prospects of Jordan Joining In Peace Efforts Seen Dim". The Washington Post.
- Issa, Iyad (Spring 2020). "Caught between the Lines: Cartographic Narratives of the Palestinian village of Dayr Ayyub from the First World War to the Present" (PDF). Jerusalem Quarterly (81): 94–118.
- Kershner, Isabel (6 September 2011). "Elusive Line Defines Lives in Israel and the West Bank". The New York Times.
- Kershner, Isabel (4 June 2013). "On Anniversary of Arab-Israeli War, a Palestinian Plea". The New York Times.
- Leuenberger, Christine; Schnell, Izhak (2020). The Politics of Maps: Cartographic Constructions of Israel/Palestine. Oxford University Press. ISBN 978-0-190-07624-5.
- Nevo, Joseph (Summer 1984). "Peace Negotiations Between Israel and Jordan after the 1948 and 1967 Wars: A Comparative Survey". Conflict Quarterly. 4 (3): 39–55.
- Newman, David (1995). Schofield, Clive (ed.). Boundaries in Flux: The 'Green Line' Boundary Between Israel and the West Bank - Past, Present and Future. Boundary and territory briefing. Vol. 1. IBRU. ISBN 978-1-897-64325-9.
- Reynolds, John (2007). Where Villages Stood: Israel's Continuing Violations of International Law in Occupied Latrun, 1967-2007 (PDF). Al-Haq. ISBN 978-9-950-32712-2.
- Segev, Tom (2007). 1967: Israel, the War, and the Year that Transformed the Middle East. Henry Holt and Company. ISBN 978-1-429-91167-2.
- "Settlements in West Bank Index" (PDF). United Nations Office for the Coordination of Humanitarian Affairs.
- Shai, Aron (Autumn–Winter 2006). "The Fate of Abandoned Arab Villages in Israel, 1965-1969". History and Memory. 18 (2): 86–106. doi:10.2979/his.2006.18.2.86. JSTOR 10.2979/his.2006.18.2.86. S2CID 159773082.
- Shapira, Anita (Autumn 1996). "Historiography and Memory: Latrun, 1948". Jewish Social Studies. 3 (1): 20–61. JSTOR 4467485.
- Shehadeh, Raja (2015). Language of War, Language of Peace: Palestine, Israel and the Search for Justice. Profile Books. ISBN 978-1-782-83121-1.
- Theobald, Andrew Gregory (May 2009). Watching the War and Keeping the Peace: The United Nations Truce Supervision Organization (UNTSO) in the Middle East, 1949-1956 (PDF) (Phd thesis). Queen's University.
- "UN Yearbook 1965" (PDF). The United Nations. 1966.
