= No man's land (Latrun) =

No man's land area between Israel and Palestine

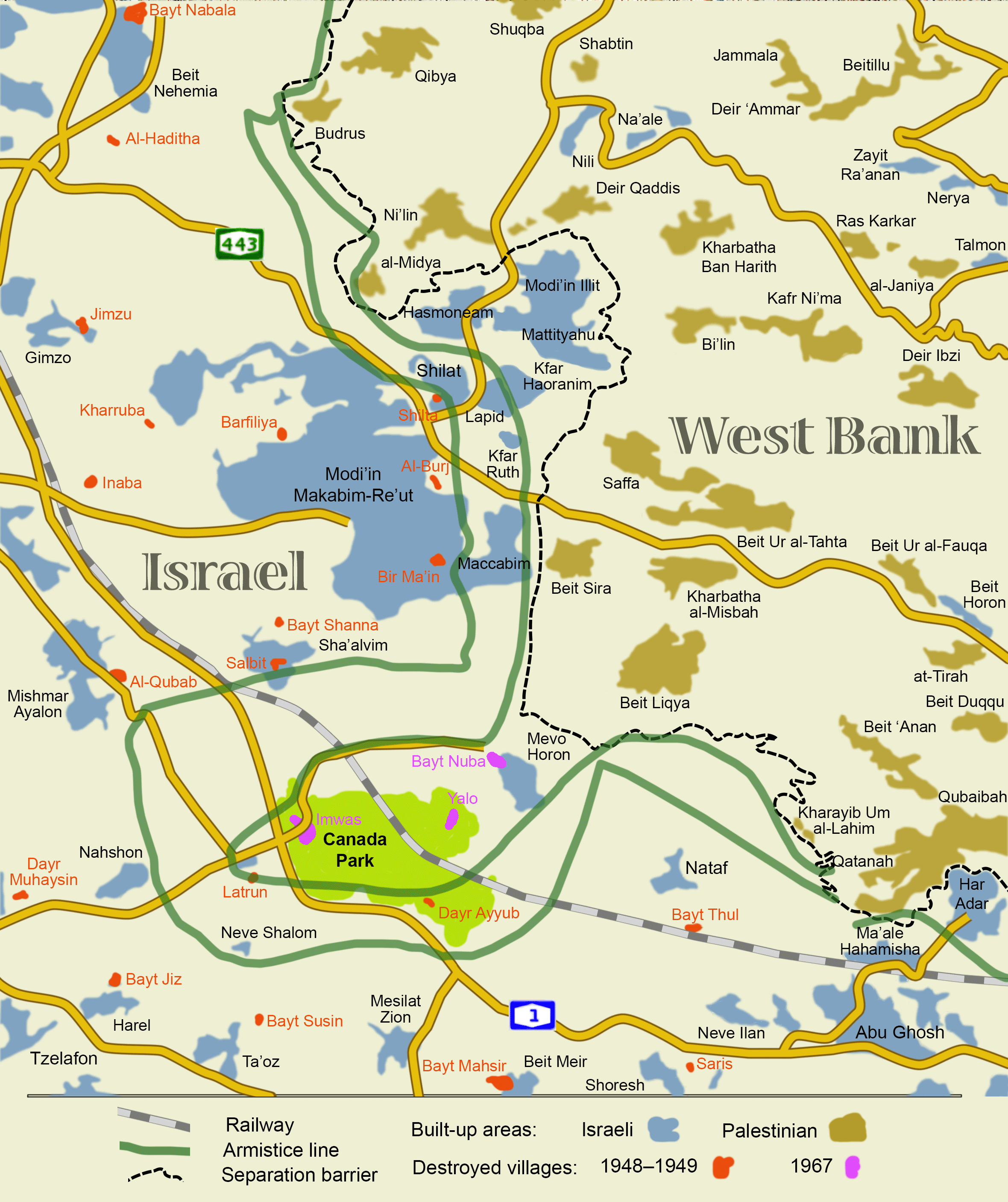
The no man's land in the Latrun region (between the green lines)

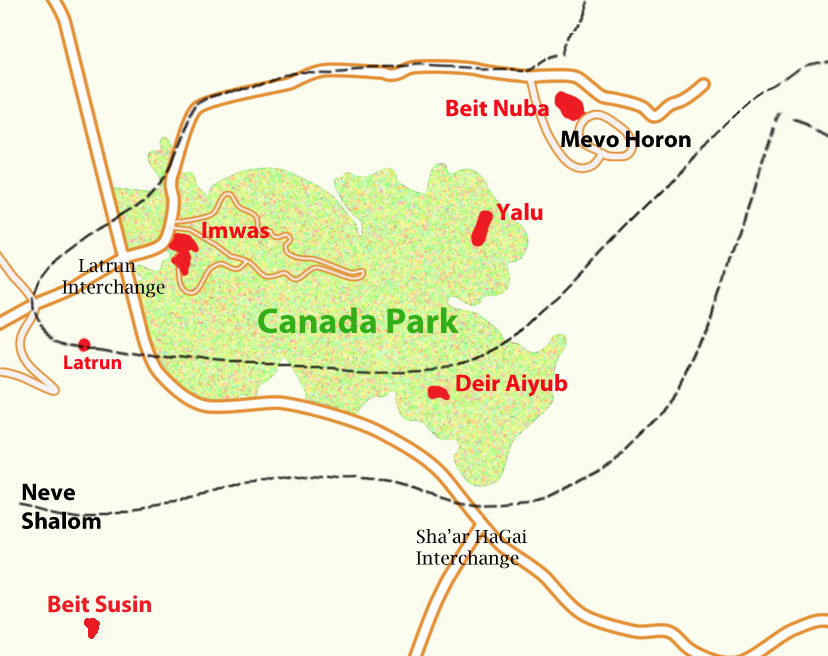
Closeup of central area

No man's land in the Latrun area (NML) was a strip of territory covering 46.4 square kilometres (17.9 sq mi), (Note: The figure of 38.2 km² given in some sources reflects the Israeli negotiating position for areas they wish to annex by consent after peace negotiations (Djerejian 2010, p. 23).) in the area of Latrun. Israel considers the area of the NML to be a part of its state, while Palestinians regard it as a part of the West Bank.

== Legal status ==
The strips of territory known as no man's land in the Latrun and Jerusalem regions were among the territories occupied by Israel following the 1967 war. Under international law, the territory is not considered to be occupied.

Both the United Nations and the European Union consider Israeli localities in the Latrun no man's land area to be illegal settlements.

== Background ==
The 1949 Armistice Agreements demarcated the NML by two lines reflecting the respective positions of the two armies at the time of the ceasefire, with the land between the lines defined as no man's land, controlled by neither party.

In 1967, Israeli forces occupied the Latrun area early on the second day of the Six-Day War. On Israeli maps since then, both the Armistice line and the no man's land enclave have disappeared. (Note: "In the Latrun area, the direct visual translation of political reality since the 1967 Israeli occupation can be analyzed effortlessly; the no man's land and the 1949 Armistice line have disappeared.) The Separation Barrier cuts off the entire Latrun area within the Israeli side of the fence. Four settlements were established in the NML area, Kfar Ruth, Lapid, Maccabim and Shilat. The Israeli-Palestinian village of Neve Shalom, founded on a project of creating a model for Israeli-Palestinian communities, was also established in the NML, cultivating land partially leased from the Catholic authorities. Israeli municipal jurisdiction was extended over these five settlements. By 2010 1,200 Israeli settlers had established homes in the area.

According to Raja Shehadeh, Israeli effectively annexed the area of no man's land in 1967. No formal act of annexation exists. In peace negotiations, according to Gideon Biger, the Israeli position has been that they retain as sovereign property half of the NML, while the other half, while belonging to Palestinians, should remain part of Israel, and the Palestinians compensated for its loss by accepting an area of similar dimensions elsewhere.

== See also ==
- Latrun salient
- Canada Park

== Sources ==
- Ahren, Raphael (1 August 2018). "Switzerland to hold reception in no-man's land between Israel, West Bank". The Times of Israel.
- Alzoughbi, Basheer (2019). "The Relocation of the U.S. Embassy from Tel Aviv to Jerusalem (Palestine v United States of America) a Commentary on the Merits of the Case, Jurisdiction of the International Court of Justice and Admissibility of Palestine's Application". University of Bologna Law Review. 4 (1): 114–205. doi:10.6092/issn.2531-6133/9425.
- Auerbach, Shakked (8 July 2017). "No One Knows Actually Where Israel Where Israel Ends and the Palestinian Territories Begin". Haaretz.
- Bailey, Sydney D. (2016). Four Arab-Israeli Wars and the Peace Process. Springer. ISBN 978-1-349-20967-5.
- Biger, Gideon (2016). "Latrun – A No Man's Land in Israel" (PDF). The European Journal of Geopolitics. 4: 122–131.
- "Crossing the Line The Tel Aviv Jerusalem Fast Train (A1): Flash report". Who Profits?. July 2017.
- Djerejian, Edward P (2 February 2010). "Getting to the Territorial Endgame of an Israeli-Palestinian Peace Settlement" (PDF). James A. Baker III Institute for Public Policy. pp. 879–902.
- Frantzman, Seth; Kark, Ruth (May 2014). "The Catholic Church in Palestine/Israel: Real Estate in 'Terra Sancta'". Middle Eastern Studies. 50 (3): 370–396. doi:10.1080/00263206.2013.871266. JSTOR 24583548. S2CID 144958547.
- Kershner, Isabel (6 September 2011). "Elusive Line Defines Lives in Israel and the West Bank". The New York Times.
- "Settlements in West Bank Index" (PDF). United Nations Office for the Coordination of Humanitarian Affairs.
- Shehadeh, Raja (2015). Language of War, Language of Peace: Palestine, Israel and the Search for Justice. Profile Books. ISBN 978-1-78283-121-1.
- "UN Yearbook 1965" (PDF). The United Nations. 1966.
