= Modi'in Natural Region =

Coordinates: 31°54′02″N 35°00′18″E

- Natural Region
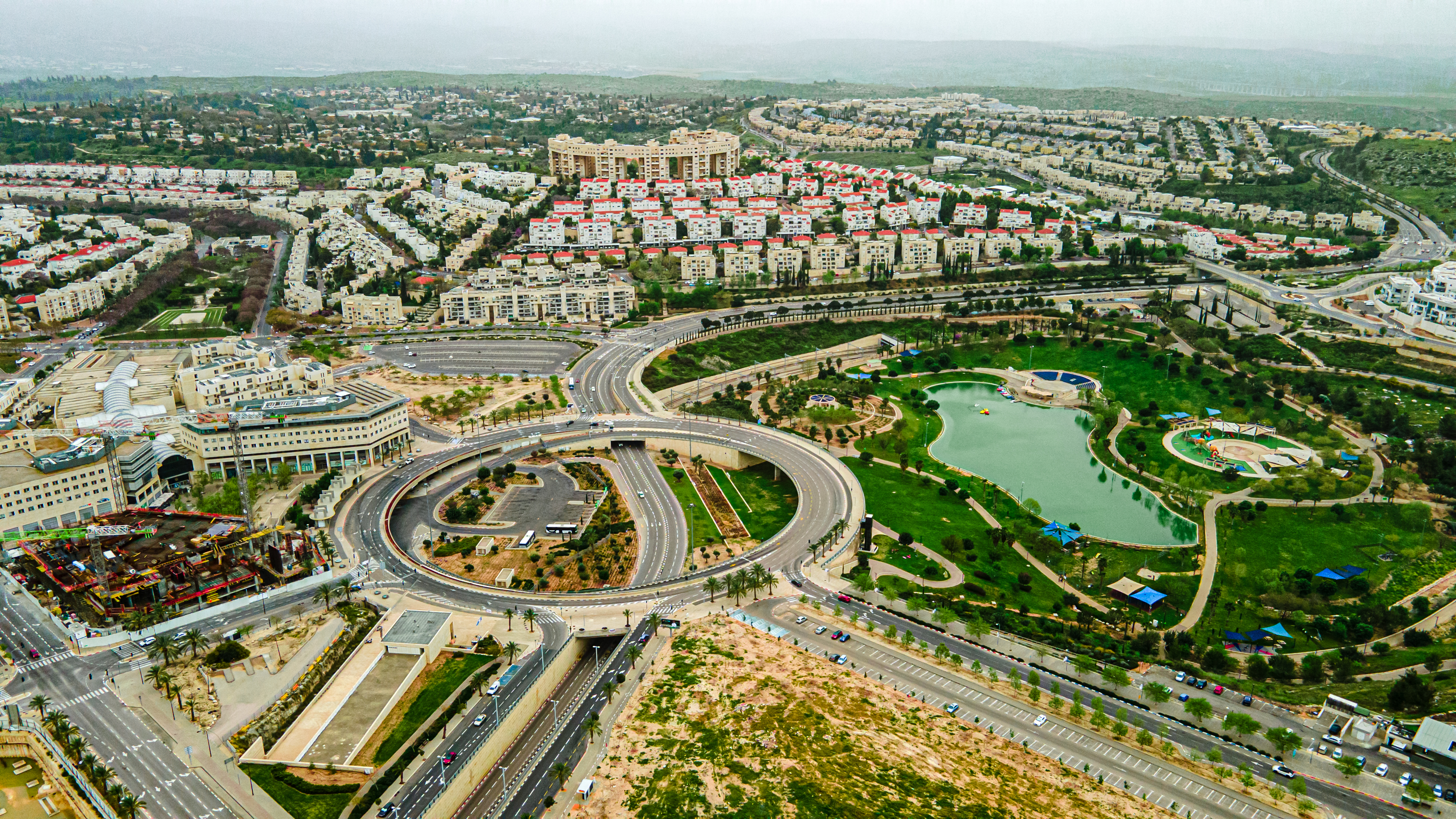
- View of Modi'in-Maccabim-Re'ut, the largest city in the Modi'in Natural Region
- Country: Israel
- District: Central
- Subdistrict: Ramla
- Largest City: Modi'in-Maccabim-Re'ut

Area
  - Total: 114 km^{2} (44 sq mi)

Population (2024)
  - Total: 109,131

Ethnicity
  - Jews and others: 98.7%
  - Arabs: 0.1%

The Modi'in Natural Region is a natural region in the Ramla Subdistrict, in the Central District of Israel. Modi'in-Maccabim-Re'ut is the largest city in the natural region.

== Geography ==
Districts, Subdistricts and Natural Regions of the State of Israel, 2018

The natural region consists mostly of the city of Modi'in-Maccabim-Re'ut (usually referred to as just Modi'in) and its hinterlands, adjacent to the Green Line, extending to Sha'alvim in the south and Kfar Daniel in the west. It has an area of 114 km^{2}. Modi'in, the largest city in the natural region, contains 92 percent of the natural region's population. The only other town in the natural region with more than 2,000 people is Lapid, a small town just northeast of Modi'in along the Green Line. The natural region contains portions of the Gezer and Hevel Modi'in regional councils.

== Demographics ==
With a population of 109,131 as of 2024, the Modi'in Natural Region is the least populous natural region in the Central District. The vast majority of the residents of the natural region are Jewish. There are no Arab towns in the natural region.

Historical population
Year	Pop.	±%
1972	500	—
1983	1,800	+260.0%
1995	3,600	+100.0%
2008	77,200	+2044.4%
2022	101,279	+31.2%
2024	109,131	+7.8%

== Administrative local authorities ==
Cities	Local Councils	Villages
Modi'in-Maccabim-Re'ut	[None]	Gezer: Nof Ayalon; Sha'alvim; Hevel Modi'in: Gimzo; Kfar Daniel; Kfar Ruth; Lapid; Mevo Modi'im; Shilat

== Voting Patterns ==
In the 2022 election, 58 percent of voters in the natural region voted for the parties of the center-left coalition led by Yair Lapid, while 37 percent voted for the parties of the right-wing coalition led by Benjamin Netanyahu and 0.2 percent voted for the Arab parties.

In the 2026 election, 59 percent of voters in the natural region voted for the parties of the center-left coalition led by Gadi Eisenkot, while 31 percent voted for the parties of the right-wing coalition led by Benjamin Netanyahu and 0.3 percent voted for the Arab parties. An additional 4.7 percent voted for the Reservists, and 4.2 percent voted for Amcha Yisrael. Voter turnout increased 21 percent from the 2022 election.
