= Modem (disambiguation) =

A modem is a device that encodes and decodes digital data transmitted by a telephone or other analog communications system.

Modem may also refer to:

- MoDem (Mouvement Démocrate), a centrist and pro-European French political party
- Modi'in-Maccabim-Re'ut, an Israeli city
