= Saffa, Ramallah =

Town in the West Bank, State of Palestine

Saffa
- Municipality type C

Arabic transcription(s)
  - Arabic: صفّاء
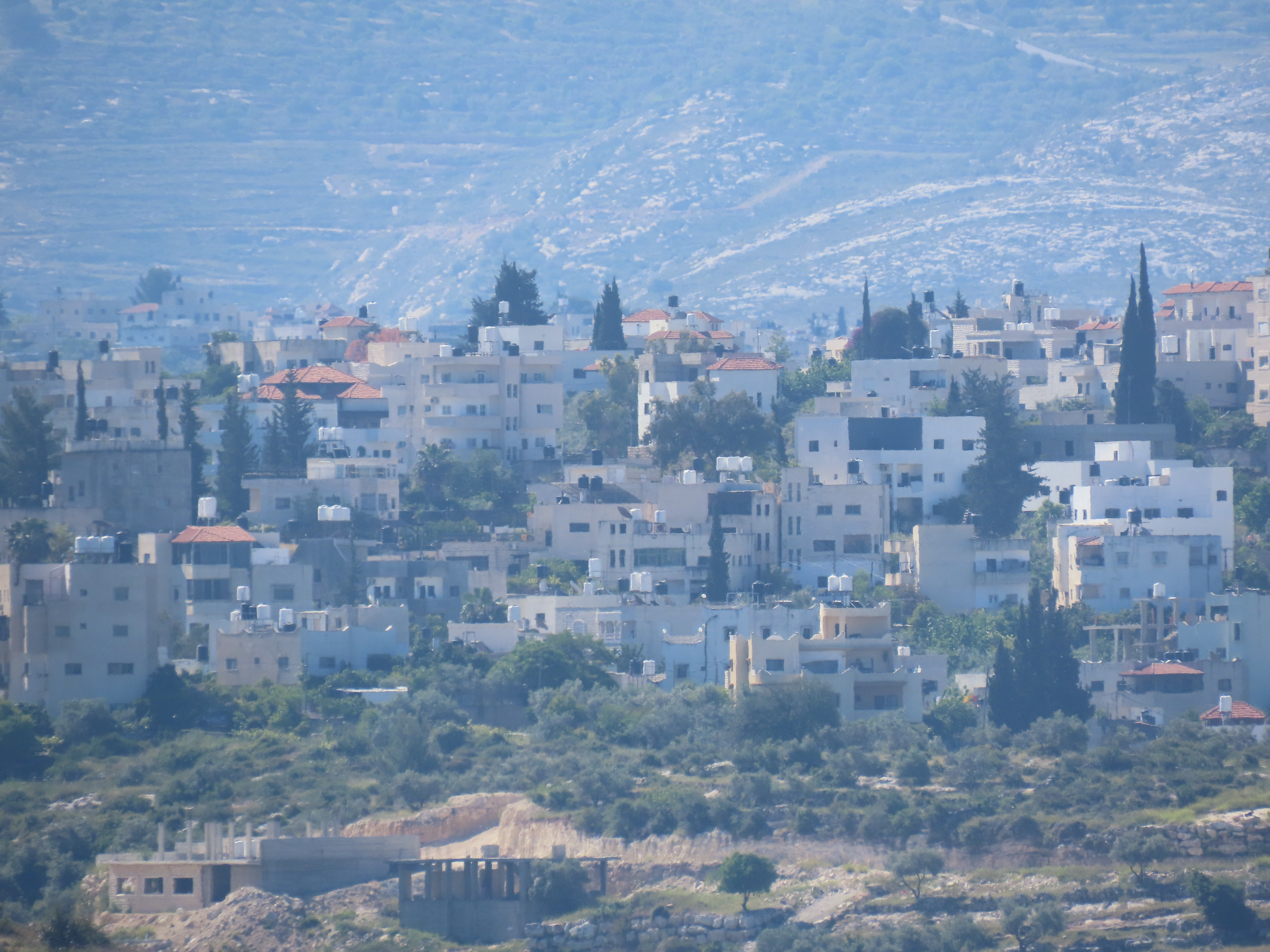

- Location of Saffa within Palestine
- Coordinates: 31°54′25″N 35°03′30″E
- Palestine grid: 155/145
- State: State of Palestine
- Governorate: Ramallah and al-Bireh

Government
  - Type: Municipality

Population (2017)
  - Total: 4,374
- Name meaning: In rows

Saffa (Arabic: صفّاء) is a Palestinian town in the Ramallah and al-Bireh Governorate, located west of Ramallah in the northern West Bank. According to the Palestinian Central Bureau of Statistics (PCBS), the town had a population of 4,374 inhabitants in 2017.

== Location ==
Saffa is located 13.3 kilometers (8.3 mi) (in straight distance) west of Ramallah. It is bordered by Beit 'Ur at Tahta, Kafr Ni'ma and Deir Ibzi to the east, Bil'in, Ni'lin and Al Midya to the north, Israel to the west, and Beit 'Ur at Tahta and Beit Sira to the south.

== History ==
F.M. Abel and Avi-Yonah both identified Saffa with the village of Sapphō (Greek: Σαπφώ), which, according to the first century AD Jewish historian Josephus, was destroyed by Arab troops serving in the army of Varus in 4 BC. It has been proposed identifying Saffa with Casale Saphet of the Crusader era.

=== Ottoman era ===
In the early Ottoman census of 1525-1526, it was not mentioned, but in 1538-1539, Saffa was located in the nahiya of Quds, and named as Mazra, or cultivated land.

In 1838 it was noted as a Muslim village, located in the Beni Harith district, west of Jerusalem.

In 1870, Victor Guérin noted that: "This village occupies a high plateau; it contains four hundred inhabitants. Some stones, scattered or embedded in Arab buildings, and numerous excavations in the rock, such as cisterns, tombs, quarries and subterranean vaults, proves that the present Saffa succeeded an ancient locality." An Ottoman village list of about the same year showed that Saffa had 200 inhabitants with 67 houses, though the population count included only the men.

In 1883 the PEF's Survey of Western Palestine described Suffa: "A small village standing high on a ridge, with a well to the east and a sacred place to the south."

In 1896 the population of Safa was estimated to be about 564 persons.

=== British Mandate era ===
In the 1922 census of Palestine, conducted by the British Mandate authorities, Saffa had a population of 495 Muslims, increasing in the 1931 census to 644 Muslims, in 143 houses.

In the 1945 statistics the population was 790 Muslims, while the total land area was 9,602 dunams, according to an official land and population survey. Of this, 2,536 were used for plantations and irrigable land, 2,975 for cereals, while 99 dunams were classified as built-up areas.

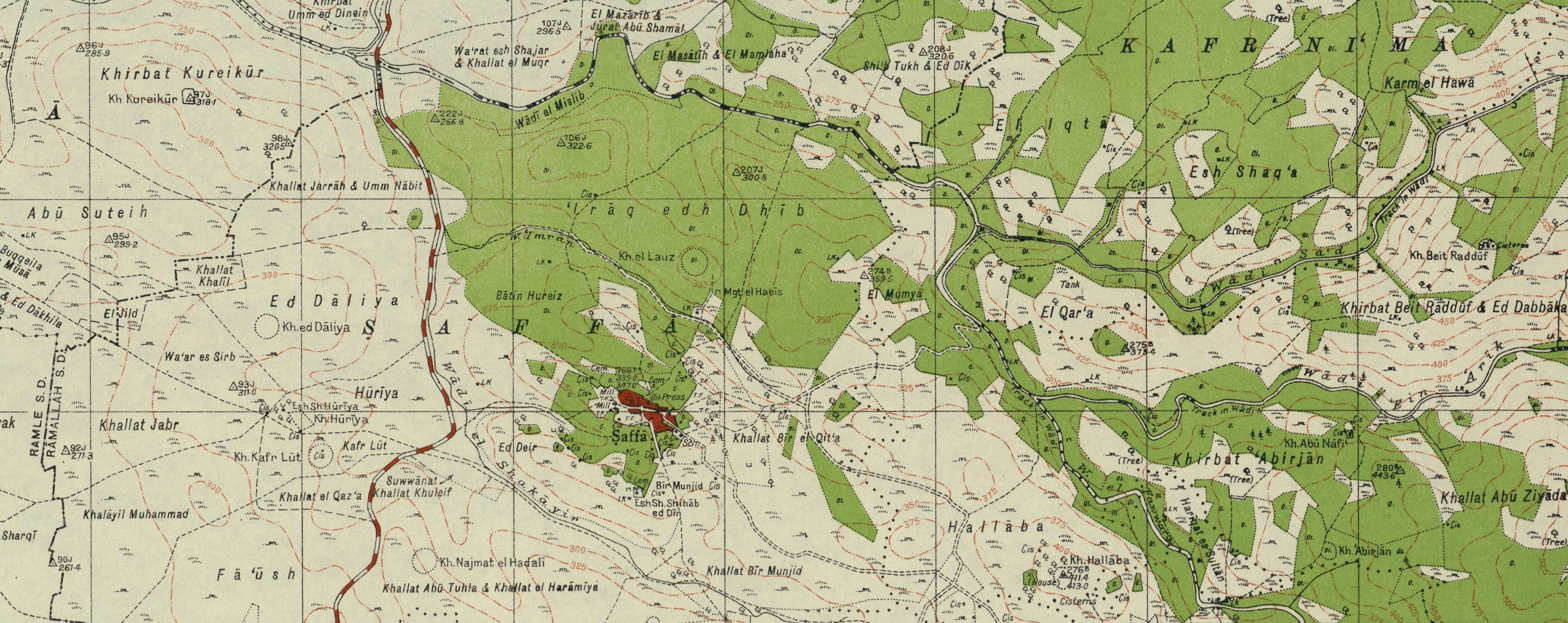
Saffa 1944 1:20,000 from 1919 survey

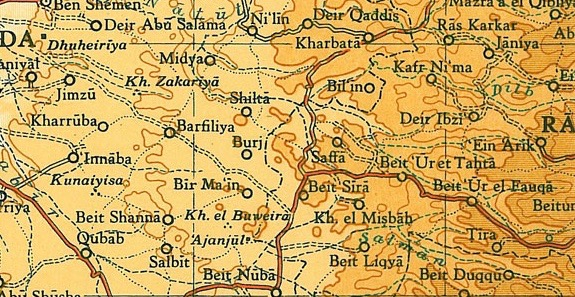
Saffa 1945 1:250,000

=== Jordanian era ===
In the wake of the 1948 Arab–Israeli War, and after the 1949 Armistice Agreements, Saffa came under Jordanian rule. It was annexed by Jordan in 1950.

In 1961, the population of Saffa was 1,364.

=== 1967-present ===
After the Six-Day War in 1967, Saffa has been under Israeli occupation.

After the 1995 accords, 12.9% of village land was classified as Area B, and the remaining 87.1% as Area C.

Israel has confiscated land from Saffa in order to construct six Israeli settlements:

- 814 dunams for Kfar Rut,
- 781 dunams for Shilat,
- 682 dunams for Menora,
- 471 dunams for Makkabim,
- 441 dunams for Lapid, and
- 5 dunams for Hashmona'im.

== Religious sites ==
=== Sheikh Shihab ed-Din shrine ===
Saffa houses the Sheikh Shihab ed-Din maqam, one of four dedicated to this seikh, found in Jaffa, Ramla, and Nazareth. Surrounded by newly developed residential areas, this maqam sits atop a natural hill, approximately 1 km north of the ancient Roman road connecting the coastal plain to Jerusalem via Beit 'Ur (ancient Bethoron) and el-Jib (ancient Gibeon). Archaeological evidence reveals a Roman settlement that thrived in the Byzantine period, possibly a monastery, marked by structures like a large building, cisterns, inscriptions, and a winepress.

While the site declined in the Early Islamic period, it was reestablished during the Ayubbid and Mamluk periods as a worship site, cemetery, and a sanctuary in memory of Sheikh Shihab ed-Din. The maqam's construction phases are identifiable, with the grave chamber and its extension likely dating back to the Ayyubid–early Mamluk period. The prayer hall and courtyard belong to the early Ottoman era. Notably, the tomb chamber and its southern extension underwent separate building phases, indicating the initial burial of the Sheikh followed by the later interment of his sons in an annexed part of the chamber.

The decision to establish Sheikh Shihab ed-Din's maqam here stems from three key motives: honoring the Sheikh, meeting local Sufi requirements for a tranquil worship space, and creating a defensive lookout against Crusaders. Hilltop maqams were strategically networked to alert against potential threats.

== Archaeological Looting ==
A study conducted by archaeologist Salah Hussein Al-Houdaileh of Al-Quds University on 119 Roman and Byzantine period rock-cut burial caves near Saffa revealed extensive looting, with all caves showing marks of robbery. This has caused considerable damage to the tomb, desecration of numerous ancient burials, and displacement of a large number of funerary artifacts from their original sites. The looting of Roman and Byzantine tombs in Saffa and surrounding areas is driven by several factors, including poverty, a lack of public awareness, insufficient enforcement of antiquities laws by the Palestinian National Authority, and an increasing demand in the illegal antiquities market for archaeological items.

== Bibliography ==
- Barron, J.B., ed. (1923). Palestine: Report and General Abstracts of the Census of 1922. Government of Palestine.
- Conder, C.R.; Kitchener, H.H. (1883). The Survey of Western Palestine: Memoirs of the Topography, Orography, Hydrography, and Archaeology. Vol. 3. London: Committee of the Palestine Exploration Fund.
- Finkelstein, I.; Lederman, Zvi, eds. (1997). Highlands of many cultures. Tel Aviv: Institute of Archaeology of Tel Aviv University Publications Section. ISBN 965-440-007-3.
- Government of Jordan, Department of Statistics (1964). First Census of Population and Housing. Volume I: Final Tables; General Characteristics of the Population (PDF).
- Government of Palestine, Department of Statistics (1945). Village Statistics, April, 1945.
- Guérin, V. (1875). Description Géographique Historique et Archéologique de la Palestine (in French). Vol. 2: Samarie, pt. 2. Paris: L'Imprimerie Nationale. (p. 109? )
- Hadawi, S. (1970). Village Statistics of 1945: A Classification of Land and Area ownership in Palestine. Palestine Liberation Organization Research Center.
- Hartmann, M. (1883). "Die Ortschaftenliste des Liwa Jerusalem in dem türkischen Staatskalender für Syrien auf das Jahr 1288 der Flucht (1871)". Zeitschrift des Deutschen Palästina-Vereins. 6: 102–149.
- Mills, E., ed. (1932). Census of Palestine 1931. Population of Villages, Towns and Administrative Areas. Jerusalem: Government of Palestine.
- Palmer, E.H. (1881). The Survey of Western Palestine: Arabic and English Name Lists Collected During the Survey by Lieutenants Conder and Kitchener, R. E. Transliterated and Explained by E.H. Palmer. Committee of the Palestine Exploration Fund.
- Robinson, E.; Smith, E. (1841). Biblical Researches in Palestine, Mount Sinai and Arabia Petraea: A Journal of Travels in the year 1838. Vol. 3. Boston: Crocker & Brewster.
- Röhricht, R. (1887). "Studien zur mittelalterlichen Geographie und Topographie Syriens". Zeitschrift des Deutschen Palästina-Vereins. 10: 195–344.
- Schick, C. (1896). "Zur Einwohnerzahl des Bezirks Jerusalem". Zeitschrift des Deutschen Palästina-Vereins. 19: 120–127.
- Socin, A. (1879). "Alphabetisches Verzeichniss von Ortschaften des Paschalik Jerusalem". Zeitschrift des Deutschen Palästina-Vereins. 2: 135–163.
- Toledano, E. (1984). "The Sanjaq of Jerusalem in the Sixteenth Century: Aspects of Topography and Population". Archivum Ottomanicum. 9: 279–319. Archived from the original on 2016-03-05.
