= Latrun =

Hilltop in the Southern Levant

- Village
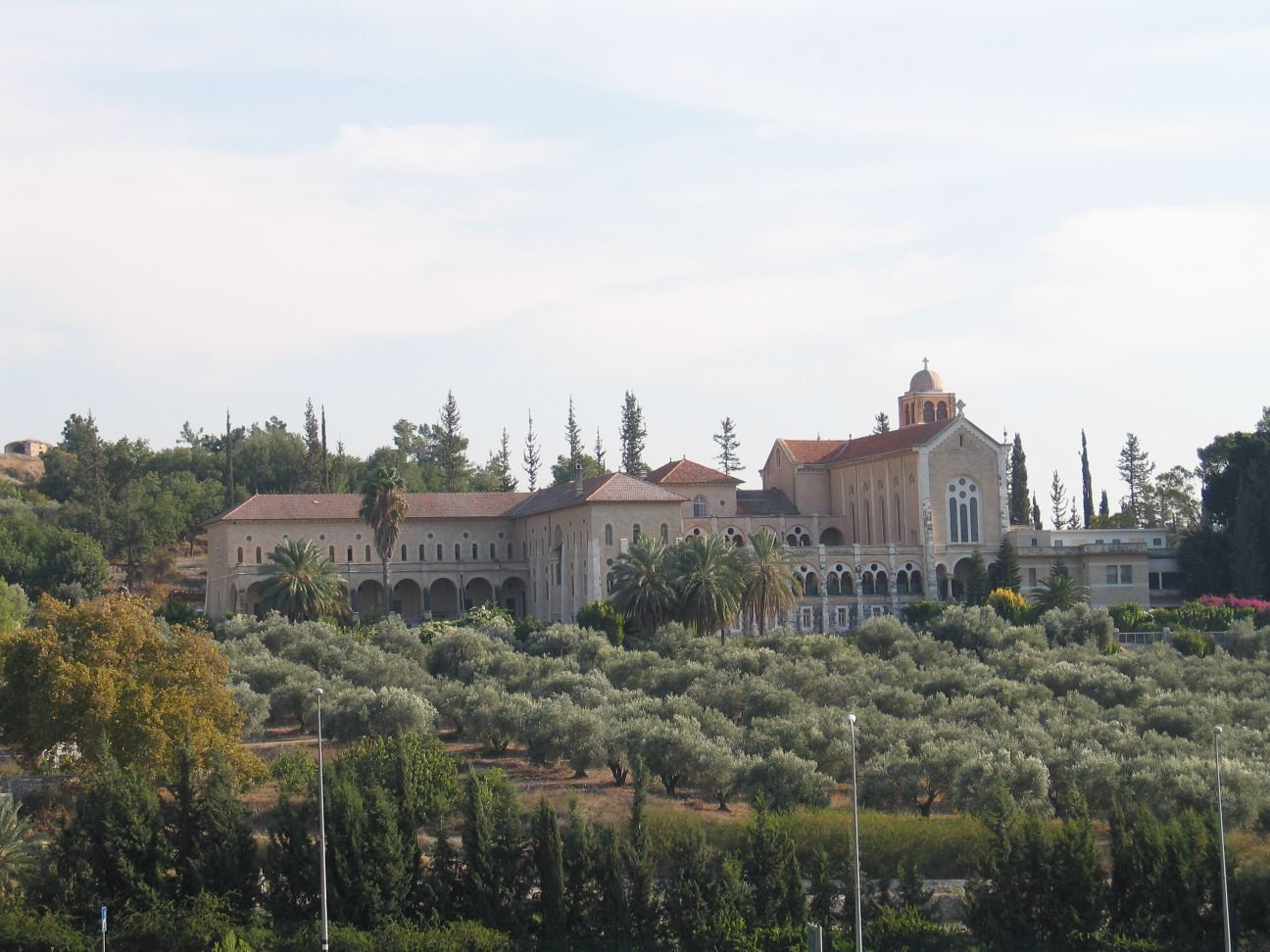
- Trappist Monastery
- Etymology: from Latronis
- Location within Israel Location within State of Palestine
- Coordinates: 31°49′55″N 34°58′53″E
- Palestine grid: 148/137
- Administered by: Israel
- Claimed by: Israel and Palestine
- Israeli district: Jerusalem
- Palestinian governorate: Ramallah and al-Bireh
- Time zone: UTC+02:00 (IST, PST)
  - Summer (DST): UTC+03:00 (IDT, PDT)

Latrun (Hebrew: לטרון, Latrun; Arabic: اللطرون, al-Latrun) is a strategic hilltop in the Latrun salient in the Ayalon Valley. It overlooks the road between Tel Aviv and Jerusalem, 25 kilometers west of Jerusalem and 14 kilometers southeast of Ramla. It was the site of fierce fighting during the 1948 war. During the period of 1949–1967, it was occupied by Jordan at the edge of a no man's land between the armistice lines. In the 1967 war it was captured by Israel and had been under Israeli control since then.

The hilltop includes the Latrun Abbey, Mini Israel (a park with scale models of historic buildings around Israel), The International Center for the Study of Bird Migration (ICSBM), the Yad La-Shiryon memorial to armored corps soldiers killed in action, and military tank museum. Neve Shalom (Oasis of Peace) is a joint Israeli-Palestinian community on a hilltop south of Latrun. Canada Park is nearby to the east.

== Etymology ==
The name Latrun is derived from the ruins of a medieval Crusader castle. There are two theories regarding the origin of the name. One is that it is a corruption of the Old French La toron des chevaliers, or of the Castilian La torón de los caballeros (The Castle of the Knights), so named by the Knights Templar, or by its Castilian founder, Rodrigo Gonzales de Lara (see below). The other is that it is from the Latin, Domus boni Latronis (The House of the Good Thief), a name given by 14th-century Christian pilgrims after the penitent thief who was crucified by the Romans alongside Jesus (Luke 23:40–43).

== History ==
=== In the Hebrew Bible ===
In the Hebrew Bible, the Ayalon Valley was the site of a battle in which the Israelites, led by Joshua, defeated the Amorites (Joshua 10:1–11).

=== Hellenistic period ===
Later, Judah Maccabee established his camp here in preparation for battle with the Seleucid Greeks, who had invaded Judea and were camped at Emmaus; this site is today identified by archaeologists as Hurvat Eked. According to the Book of Maccabees, Judah Maccabee learned that the Greeks were planning to march on his position, and successfully ambushed the invaders. The Jewish victory in what was later called the Battle of Emmaus led to greater Jewish autonomy under Hasmonean rule over the next century.

=== Crusader period ===
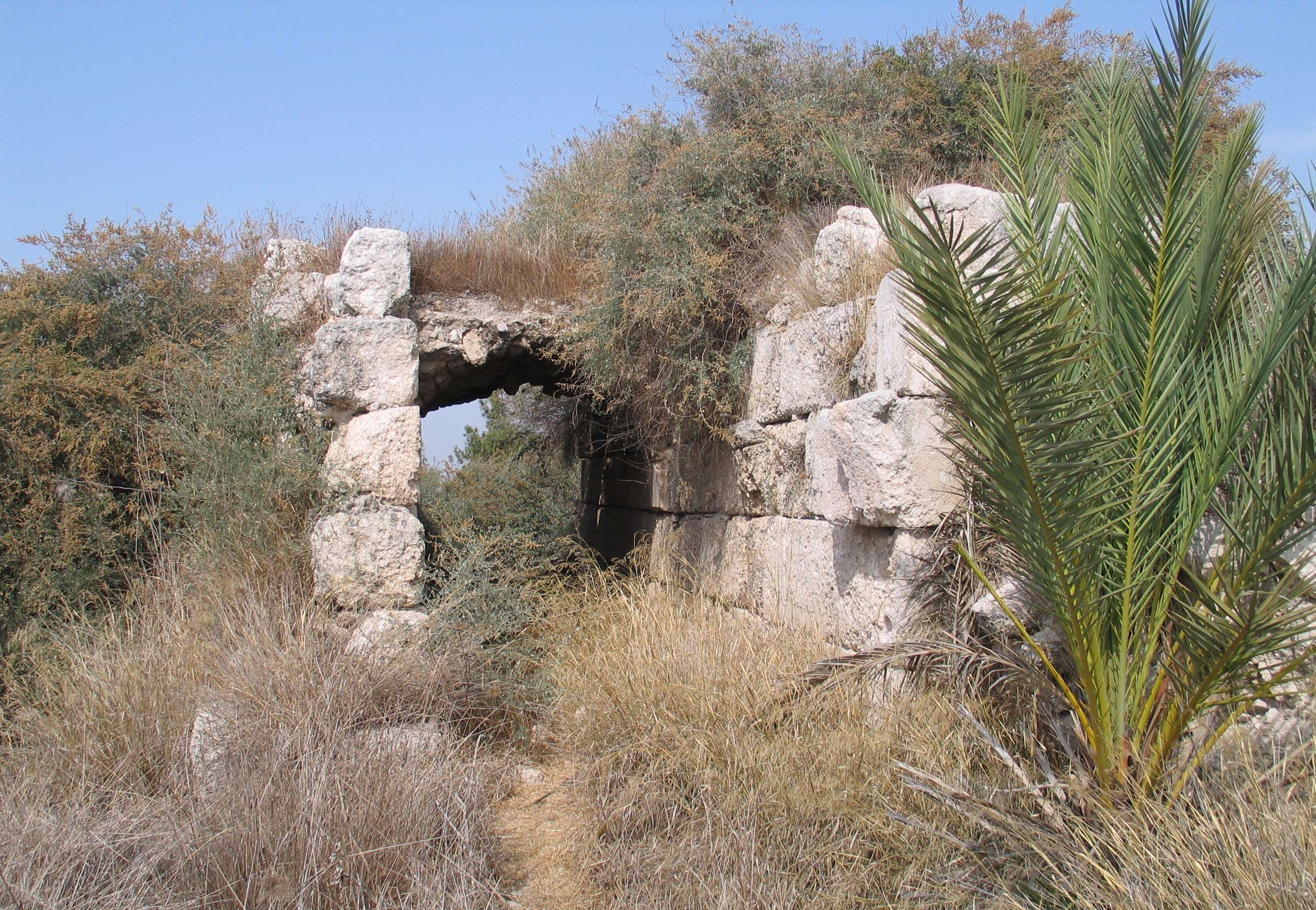
Remains of the Crusader castle at Latrun

Little remains of the castle, which was reputedly built in the 1130s by a Castilian nobleman Rodrigo González de Lara who later gave it to the Templars. The main tower was later surrounded with a rectangular enclosure with vaulted chambers. This in turn was enclosed by an outer court, of which one tower survives.

=== Ottoman period ===
==== Village ====
Walid Khalidi in his book All That Remains describes al-Latrun as a small village established in the late 19th century by villagers from nearby Emmaus.

In 1883, the PEF's Survey of Western Palestine (SWP) described Latrun as a few adobe huts among the ruins of a medieval fortress.

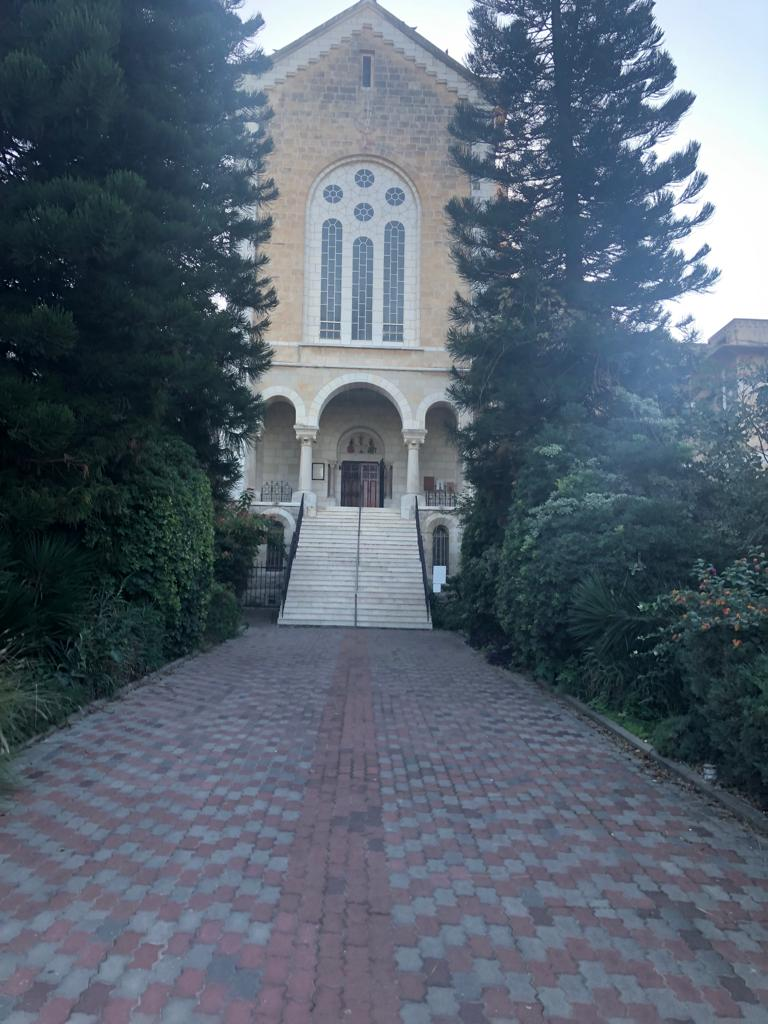
Outside the Latrun Trappist Monastery in Jerusalem

==== Trappist monastery ====
In December 1890, a monastery was established at Latrun by French, German and Flemish monks of the Trappist order, from Sept-Fons Abbey in France, at the request of Monseigneur Poyet of the Latin Patriarchate of Jerusalem. The monastery(fr) is dedicated to Our Lady of the Seven Sorrows. The liturgy is in French. The monks bought the 'Maccabee Hotel', formerly called 'The Howard' from the Batato brothers together with two-hundred hectares of land and started the community in a building which still stands in the monastic domain. The old monastery complex was built between 1891 and 1897. In 1909 it was given the status of a priory and that of an abbey in 1937. The community was expelled by the Ottoman Turks between 1914–1918 and the buildings pillaged, a new monastery being built during the next three decades.

The monks established a vineyard using knowledge gained in France and advice from an expert in the employ of Baron Edmond James de Rothschild from the Carmel-Mizrahi Winery. Today they produce a wide variety of wines that are sold in the Abbey shop and elsewhere.

=== British Mandate ===
In the 1922 census of Palestine, conducted by the British Mandate authorities, Latrun had a population of 59, all Muslims. In addition, Dair Latrun ("The monastery of Latrun") had a population of 37 Christian males. In the 1931 census they were counted together, and Latrun had a population 120; 76 Muslims and 44 Christians, in a total of 16 "houses".

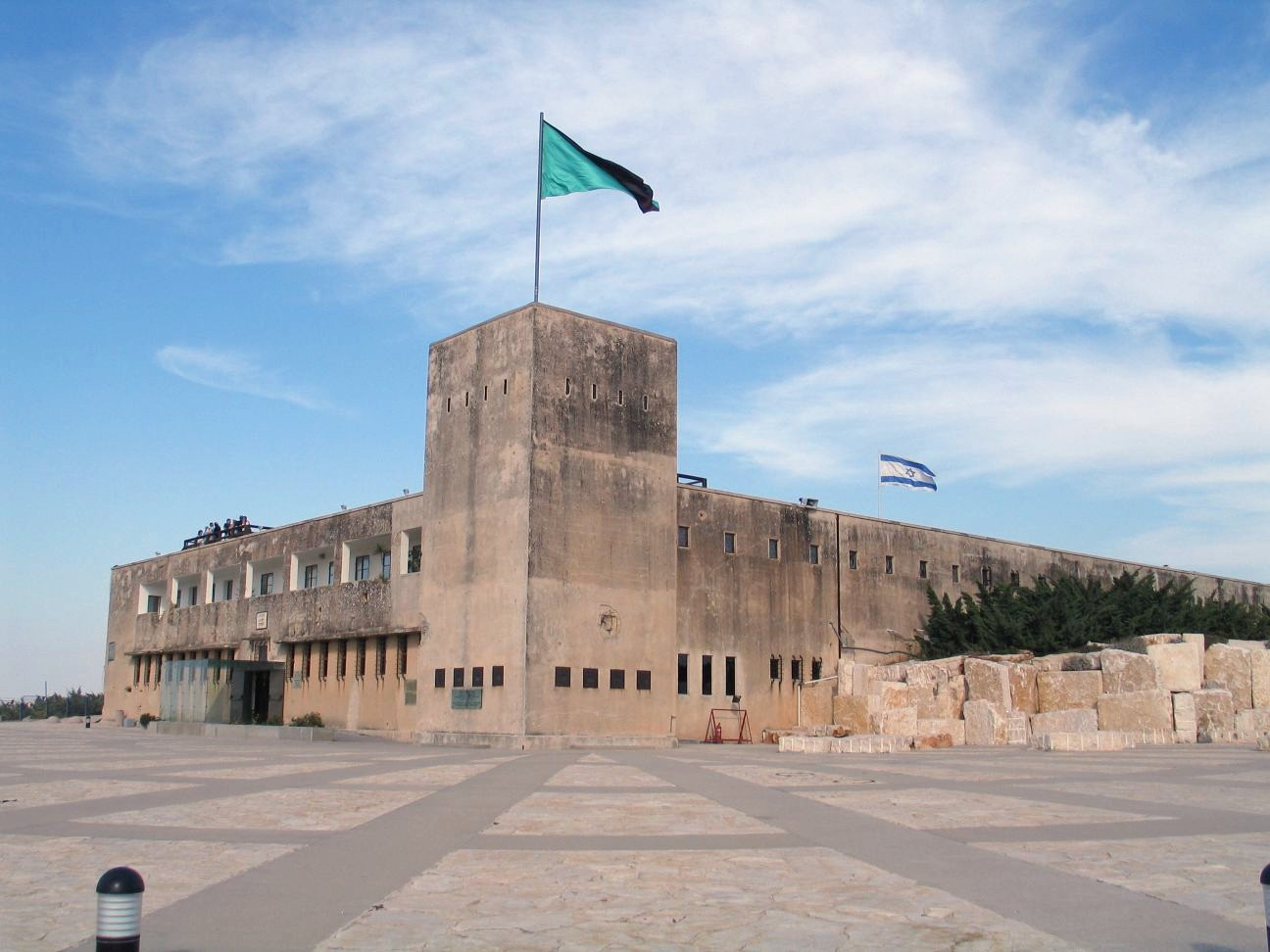
The Tegart police fort

During WWI the monastery sustained significant damage. Latrun and its environs saw heavy fighting during the Sinai and Palestine campaign, an offensive launched in the fall of 1917 by the Entente powers against the Ottoman Empire and its allies. The monastery's interior furnishings, as well as all of its windows and doors, were either looted or destroyed as a result of the conflict. After the war, a new monastery was built at Latrun in 1926, and the crypt was completed in 1933. However the church was again damaged during the Arab-Israeli war of 1948, and required further restoration. This work was completed, and the church officially consecrated, on 21 November 1953. The monastery was designed by the community's first abbot, Dom Paul Couvreur, and is an example of Cistercian architecture. Many of the stained-glass windows were produced by a monk of the community.

A Juniorate, a school for young boys, ran from 1931 until 1963 and provided many vocations for the community, especially of Lebanese monks.

Following the 1936–39 Arab revolt, the British authorities built a number of police forts (named Tegart forts after their designer) at various locations; Latrun was chosen due to its strategic significance, particularly its dominant position above the Tel-Aviv-Jerusalem road. Many members of the Yishuv who had resisted the British administration were imprisoned in a detention camp at Latrun. Moshe Sharett, later Israel's second Prime Minister, and several other members of the Jewish Agency's Executive Committee, were held at Latrun for several months in 1946.

As of the 1945 statistics, the population of the Latrun village had grown to 190 Christians, with a total of 8,376 dunams of land. Of this, a total of 6,705 dunams were used for cereals, 439 dunams were irrigated or used for orchards, 7 for citrus and bananas, while 4 dunams were classified as built-up public areas.

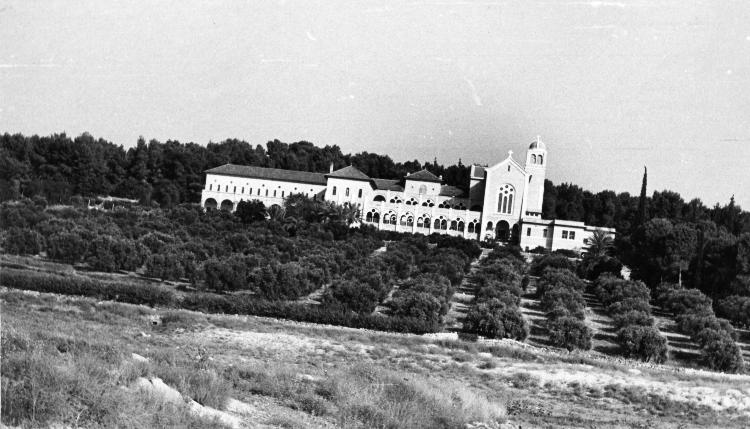
Latrun Monastery 1948

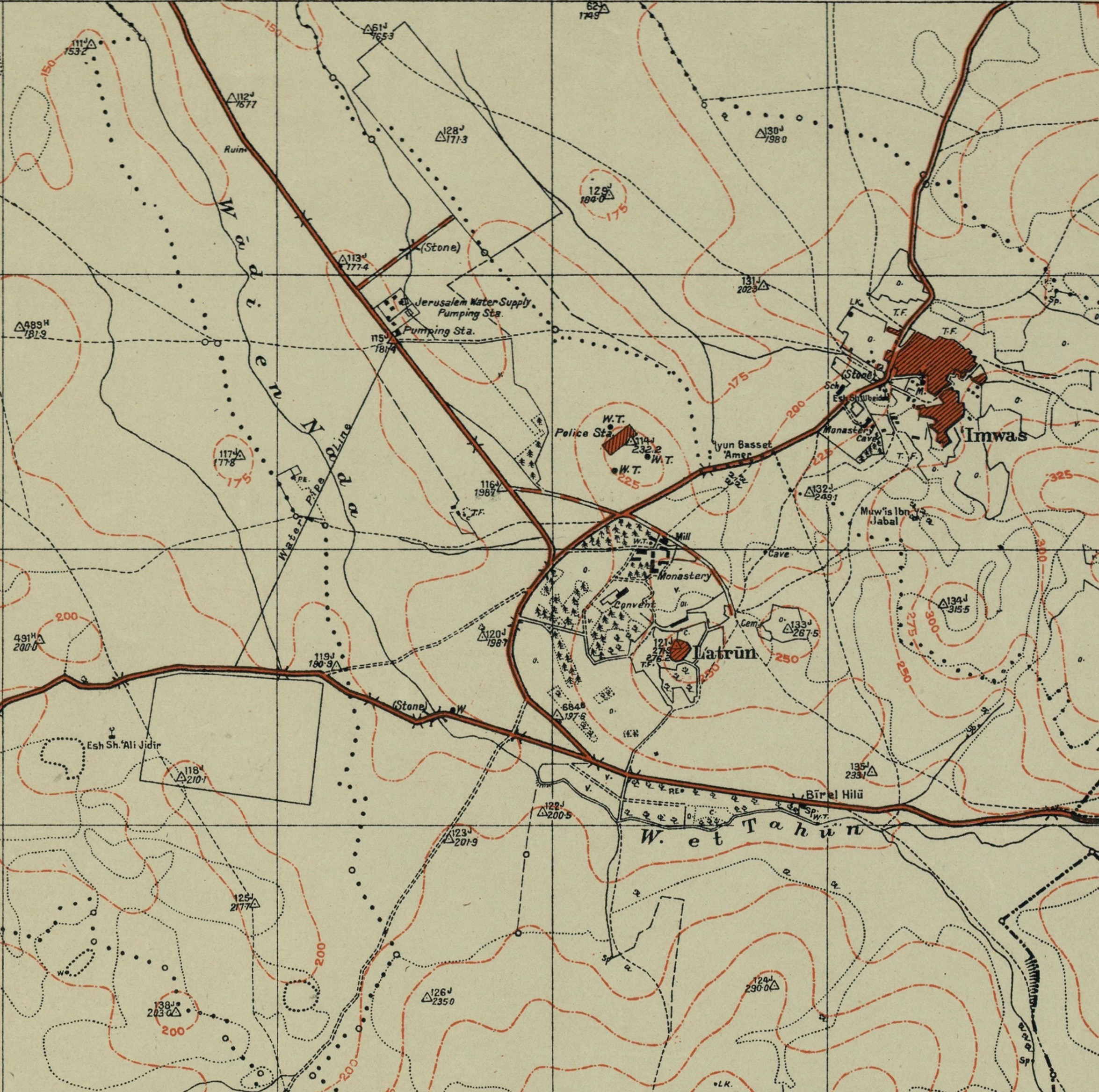
Latrun 1942 1:20,000

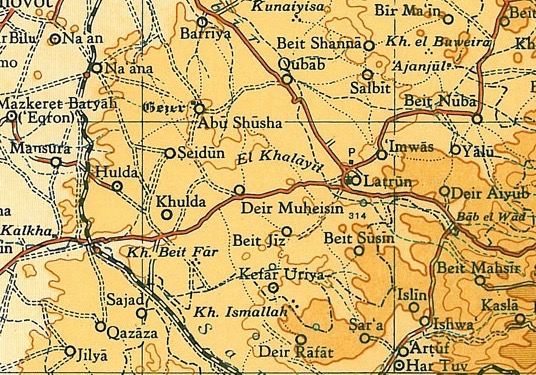
Latrun 1945 1:250,000

=== 1948 and 1967 Arab–Israeli Wars ===
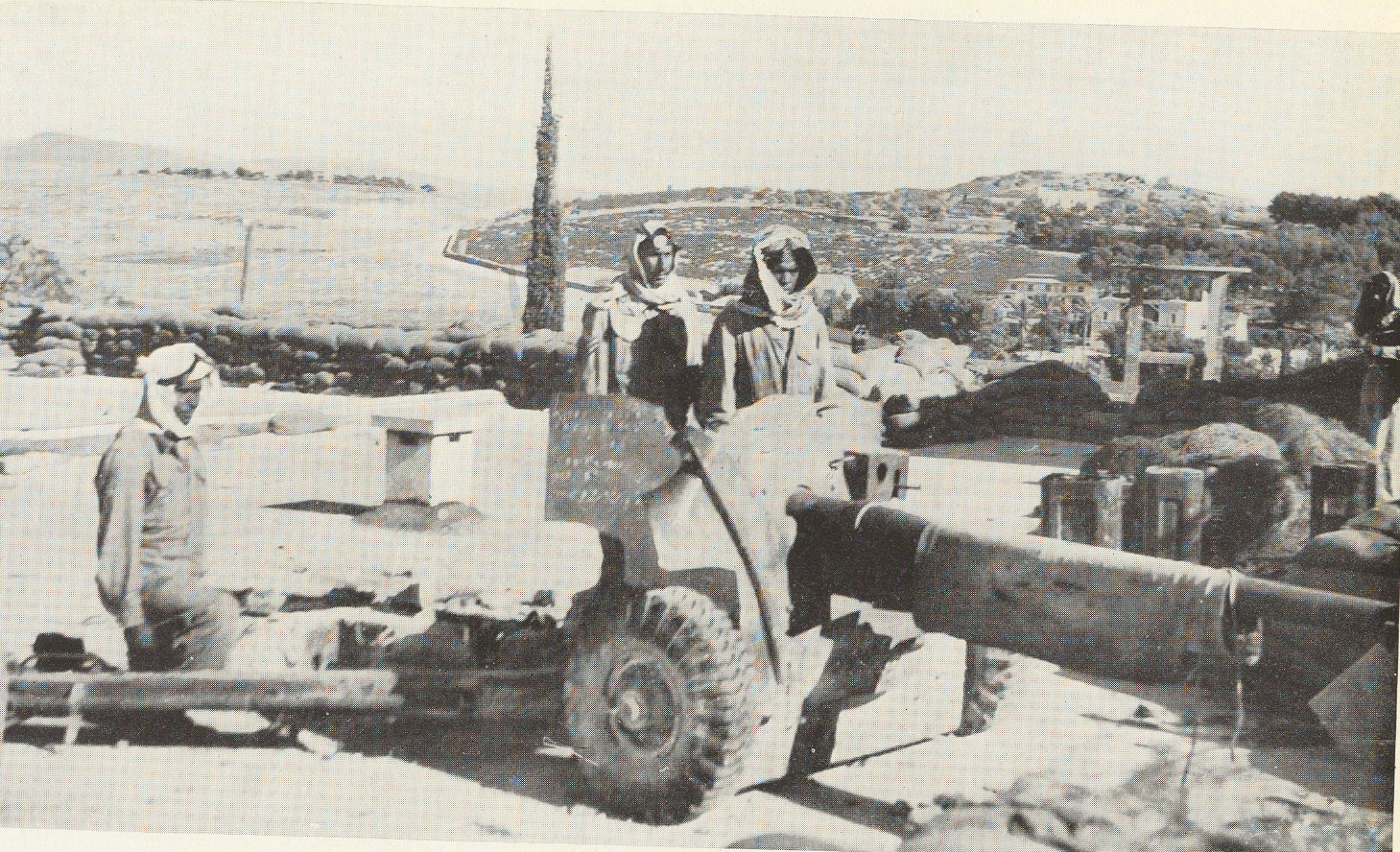
Arab Legion gunners on the roof of Latrun police station, 1948

The road from the coastal plain to Jerusalem was blocked after the British withdrew and handed the fort of Latrun over to Jordan's Arab Legion. The Arab Legionnaires used the fort to shell Israeli vehicles traveling on the road below, effectively imposing a military siege on Jerusalem and the Jewish residents there, despite that the United Nations plan was to keep Jerusalem as an international zone with neither Jordan, Israel, nor the Palestinian Arab Higher Committee having sovereignty over it.

On 24 May 1948, ten days after the Israeli Declaration of Independence per the United Nations General Assembly's Resolution 181 and the Arab assaults against Israel which followed, the Jordanian Legion's fort was assaulted by combined forces of Israel's newly created 7th Armored Brigade, and a battalion of the Alexandroni Brigade. Ariel Sharon, then a platoon commander, was wounded at Latrun along with many of his soldiers. The assault, codenamed Operation Bin Nun Alef (24–25 May), was unsuccessful, sustaining heavy casualties. On 31 May 1948, a second attack against the fort, codenamed Operation Bin Nun Bet, also failed, although the outer defenses had been breached.

Many of the Israeli fighters were young Holocaust survivors who had just arrived in the country and had minimal military training. The official casualty figure for both battles was 139.

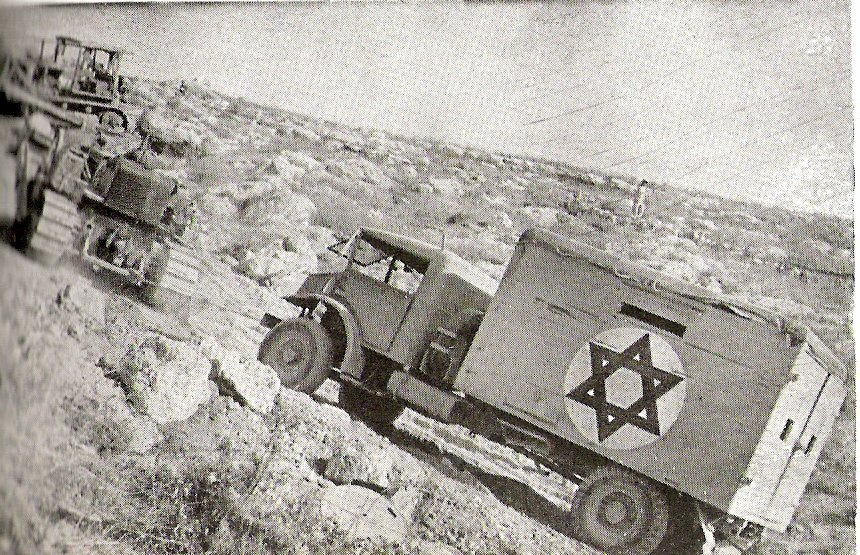
A bulldozer tows a truck on the "Burma Road" to Jerusalem, June 1948

To circumvent the blocked road, a makeshift camouflaged road through the seemingly impassable mountains towards Jerusalem was constructed under the command of Mickey (David) Marcus. This bypassed the main routes overlooked by Latrun and was named the Burma Road after its emergency supply-line namesake between Kunming (China) and Lashio (Burma), improvised by the Allies in World War II. By 10 June 1948, the road was fully operational, putting an end to the month-old Arab blockade.

On 2 August, the Truce Commission drew the attention of the Security Council to the Arabs' refusal to allow water and food supplies to reach Jewish West Jerusalem. After much negotiation, it was agreed that United Nations convoys would transport supplies, but the convoys often came under sniper fire. Towards the end of August, the situation improved. The destruction of the Latrun pumping station made it impossible for water in adequate quantities to flow to West Jerusalem, but the Israelis built an auxiliary small-capacity water pipeline along the "Burma Road", which provided a minimum amount of water.

After Operation Danny, Israeli forces anticipated a Jordanian counterattack, possibly from Latrun, but King Abdullah remained within the bounds of the tacit agreement made with the Jewish Agency and kept his troops at Latrun.

In the 1949 Armistice Agreements, the fort remained a salient under Jordanian control, which was in turn surrounded by a perimeter of no man's land. Under the cease-fire agreement, Jordan was not to disrupt Israeli travelers using this road; in practice, constant sniper attacks led Israel to build a bypass road around the bulge.

In the Six-Day War of 1967, Latrun was captured by the Israeli Defense Forces (IDF), and the main road to Jerusalem was reopened and made safe for travel.

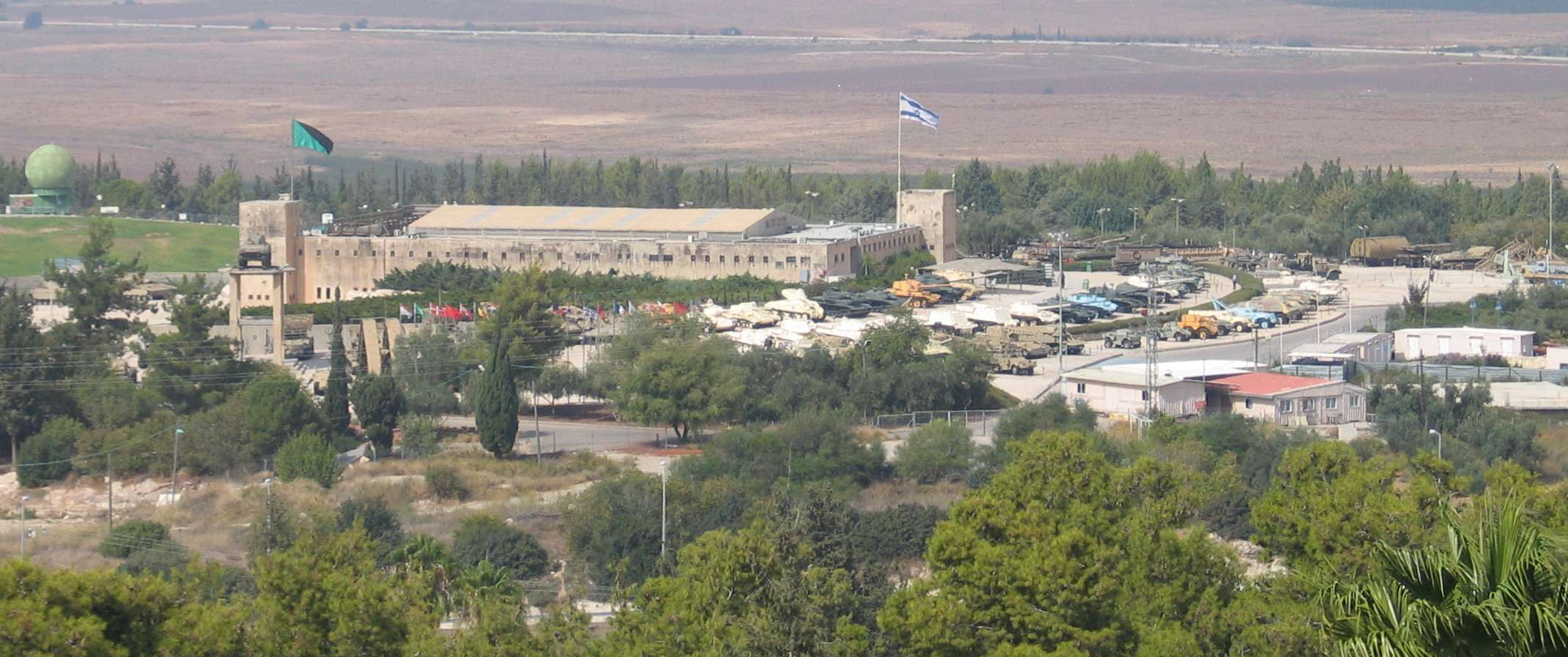
Yad La-Shiryon museum.

The village of Latrun, our first objective, was built around the ruins of an old Crusader castle on the crest of a hill overlooking the Jerusalem road. On the southern slopes of the olive groves stretched down the road, while at the bottom of the western slope sat a big Trappist monastery.

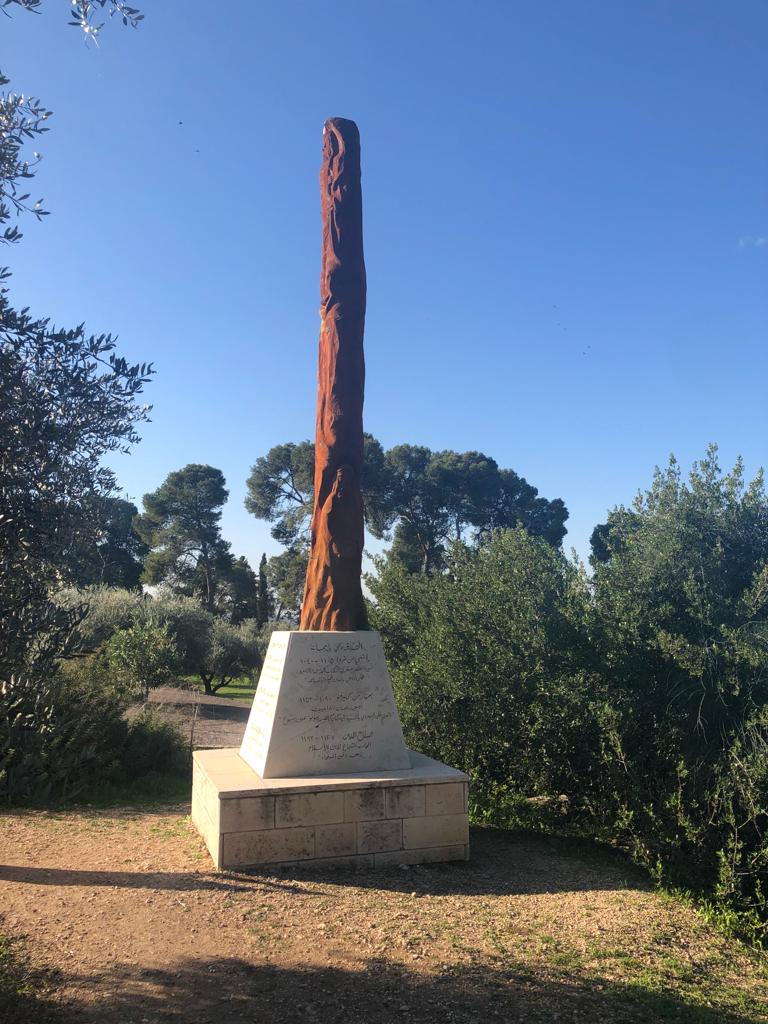
Artwork outside the Latrun Trappist Monastery in Jerusalem

=== Since the Six-Day War ===
The Latrun monastic community allowed two communities, Neve Shalom/Wahat as-Salam and an affiliate of the Jesus-Bruderschaft, to be established on its land. The Tegart fort became the Yad La-Shiryon memorial for the fallen soldiers of the Israeli Armored Corps and a museum was established there.

== Bibliography ==
- Barron, J.B., ed. (1923). Palestine: Report and General Abstracts of the Census of 1922. Government of Palestine.
- Conder, C.R.; Kitchener, H.H. (1883). The Survey of Western Palestine: Memoirs of the Topography, Orography, Hydrography, and Archaeology. Vol. 3. London: Committee of the Palestine Exploration Fund.
- Government of Palestine, Department of Statistics (1945). Village Statistics, April, 1945.
- Guérin, V. (1868). Description Géographique Historique et Archéologique de la Palestine (in French). Vol. 1: Judee, pt. 1. Paris: L'Imprimerie Nationale. (pp. 59, 309–313)
- Hadawi, S. (1970). Village Statistics of 1945: A Classification of Land and Area ownership in Palestine. Palestine Liberation Organization Research Center.
- Khalidi, W. (1992). All That Remains: The Palestinian Villages Occupied and Depopulated by Israel in 1948. Washington D.C.: Institute for Palestine Studies. ISBN 0-88728-224-5.
- Kennedy, Hugh (2000). Crusader Castles. Cambridge University Press. ISBN 0-521-79913-9.
- Mills, E., ed. (1932). Census of Palestine 1931. Population of Villages, Towns and Administrative Areas. Jerusalem: Government of Palestine.
- Morris, B. (2004). The Birth of the Palestinian Refugee Problem Revisited. Cambridge University Press. ISBN 978-0-521-00967-6.
- Morris, B. (2008). 1948 : A History of the First Arab-Israeli War. New Haven [Conn.]: Yale University Press. ISBN 978-0300126969.
- Latrun (2002, ISBN 965-7130-10-7) is a novel by Ram Oren describing the two Battles of Latrun and the events surrounding them.
- Palmer, E.H. (1881). The Survey of Western Palestine: Arabic and English Name Lists Collected During the Survey by Lieutenants Conder and Kitchener, R. E. Transliterated and Explained by E.H. Palmer. Committee of the Palestine Exploration Fund.
- Pappé, I (2006). The Ethnic Cleansing of Palestine. London and New York: Oneworld. ISBN 1-85168-467-0.
- Pappé, I. (2006b). The Making of the Arab-Israeli Conflict, 1947-1951. London and New York: I.B. Tauris. ISBN 1-85043-819-6.
- Phillips, Jonathan (2007). "The Second Crusade: Extending the Frontiers of Christendom" (Document). Yale University Press. doi:10.1093/jis/etp064.
- Pringle, D. (1997). Secular buildings in the Crusader Kingdom of Jerusalem: an archaeological Gazetter. Cambridge University Press. ISBN 0521-46010-7.
- Pringle, D. (1998). The Churches of the Crusader Kingdom of Jerusalem: L-Z (excluding Tyre). Vol. II. Cambridge University Press. ISBN 0-521-39037-0.
- Robinson, E.; Smith, E. (1841). Biblical Researches in Palestine, Mount Sinai and Arabia Petraea: A Journal of Travels in the year 1838. Vol. 3. Boston: Crocker & Brewster.
- Tobler, T. (1854). Dr. Titus Toblers zwei Bücher Topographie von Jerusalem und seinen Umgebungen (in German). Vol. 2. Berlin: G. Reimer. (pp. 753 ff)
