= Isabel Kershner =

British-Israeli journalist

- Status: Married
- Occupations: Journalist, author
- Notable credit(s): The New York Times, The Jerusalem Report
- Spouse: Hirsh Goodman
- Children: Gavriel and Lev (sons)

Isabel Kershner is a British-born Israeli journalist and author, who began reporting from Jerusalem for The New York Times in 2007. Kershner had previously worked as senior Middle East editor for The Jerusalem Report magazine. She has also written for The New Republic and has provided commentary on Middle East affairs on BBC Radio and elsewhere. Her latest book is "The Land of Hope and Fear: Israel's Battle for its Inner Soul", published in 2023.

== Career ==
Kershner was born in Manchester, England. She completed a degree in Oriental Studies from the University of Oxford. In April 1992, she married author Hirsh Goodman, a fellow immigrant to Israel; the couple have two children, Gavriel and Lev. Kershner speaks Hebrew and Arabic.

== Criticism ==
In her role reporting on Israeli-Palestinian issues, she has been accused of conflict of interest, as her son has served in the Israel Defense Forces, and her husband is an employee of the Institute for National Security Studies, which is involved in promoting a positive image of Israel, and which Kershner often relies on as a source.

== Bibliography ==
- Barrier: The Seam of the Israeli-Palestinian Conflict. London: Palgrave Macmillan, 2005. ISBN 1-4039-6801-2 ISBN 978-1403968012
