= Modi'in-Maccabim-Re'ut =

Coordinates: 31°54′27.55″N 35°0′27.41″E

Modi'in-Maccabim-Re'ut מודיעין־מכבים־רעות (Hebrew)
- City
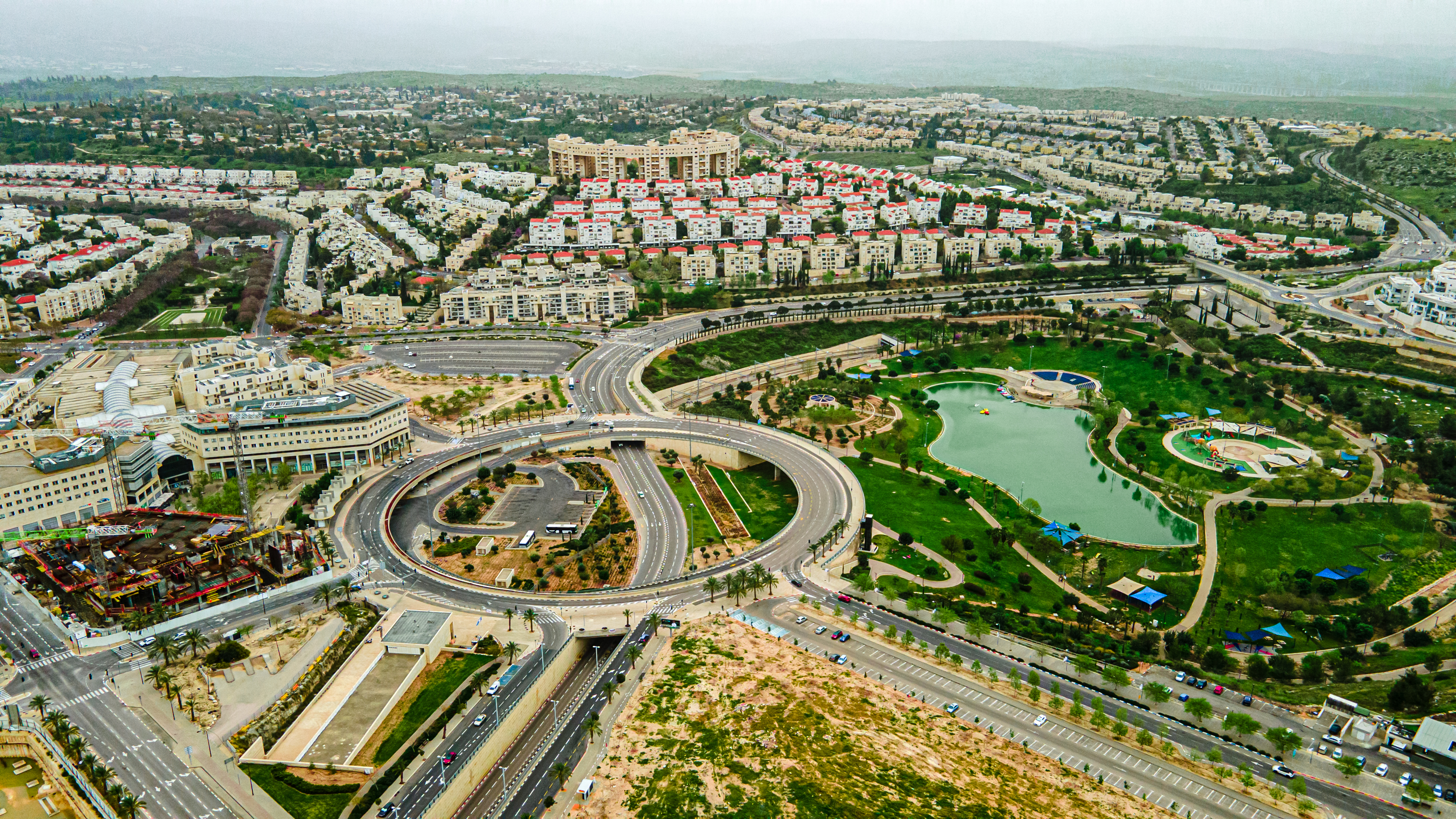
- View of Modi'in

- Coat of arms
- Interactive map of Modi'in-Maccabim-Re'ut
- Location within Israel Modi'in-Maccabim-Re'ut (Israel)
- Country: Israel (Note: The Maccabim neighborhood of the city is in the no man's land between Israel and the Israeli-occupied West Bank.)
- District: Central
- Subdistrict: Ramla
- Natural Region: Modi'in
- Founded: 1985 (Maccabim); 1987 (Re'ut); 1993 (Modi'in); 2003 (merger)

Government
  - Type: Mayor–council
  - Body: Municipality of Modi'in-Maccabim-Re'ut
  - Mayor: Haim Bibas (Likud)

Area
  - Total: 50,176 dunams (50.176 km^{2}; 19.373 sq mi)
- Elevation: 209 m (686 ft)

Population (2024)
  - Total: 100,052
  - Density: 1,994.0/km^{2} (5,164.5/sq mi)

Ethnicity
  - Jews and others: 99.9%
  - Arabs: 0.1%
- Time zone: UTC+2 (IST)
  - Summer (DST): UTC+3 (IDT)
- Website: modiin.muni.il

Modi'in-Maccabim-Re'ut (Hebrew: מודיעין־מכבים־רעות, romanized: Mōdīʿīn-Makkabbīm-Rēʿūt), usually referred to as just Modi'in, is a city in the Central District of Israel, about 35 kilometres (22 mi) southeast of Tel Aviv and 30 kilometres (19 mi) west of Jerusalem, and is connected to those two cities via Highway 443. In 2024 the population was 100,052. The population density in that year was 1,794 people per square kilometer.

The modern city, which was built in the 20th century, is named after the ancient Jewish town of Modi'in, which existed in the same area. Modi'in was the place of origin of the Maccabees, the Jewish rebels who freed Judea from the rule of the Seleucid Empire and established the Hasmonean dynasty, events commemorated by the holiday of Hanukkah.

A small part of the city (the Maccabim neighborhood) is not recognized by the European Union (EU) as being in Israel, as it lies in what the 1949 Armistice Agreement with Jordan left as a no man's land, and was occupied in 1967 by Israel after it was captured from Jordan together with the West Bank proper.

== Etymology ==
The name "Modi'in" (Hebrew: מודיעין) derives from the ancient Jewish village of Modi'im, of the high priest Mattathias and his five sons, which was located in the same area as the modern city. The name "Maccabim" (Hebrew: מכבים) is Hebrew for the Maccabees and is a common nickname given to Mattathias and his five sons.

== History ==
=== Ancient Modi'in ===
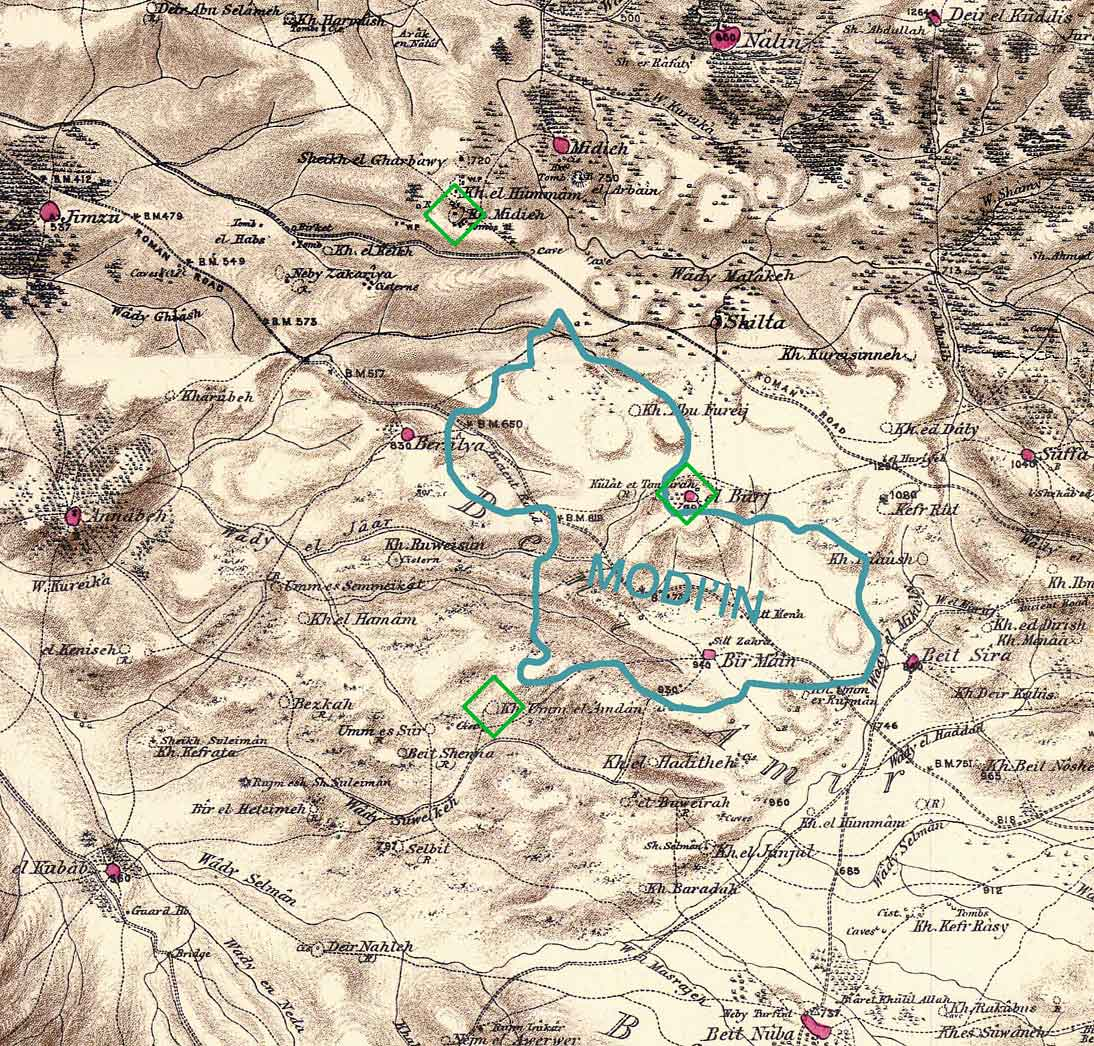
Three possible locations of Modi'in

During classical antiquity, a town named Modi'in (Ancient Greek: Μωδεειμ, Mōdeeim) existed in the general area of the modern city. It was the place of origin of the Maccabees, a group of Jewish rebel warriors who started and led the Jewish revolt against the Seleucid rule over Judea and the Hellenisation of its Jewish population. The revolt succeeded in driving out the Seleucids, and the rededication of the Second Temple at the end of the revolt is commemorated by the Jewish holiday of Hanukkah. After expelling the Seleucids, the Maccabees formed the Hasmonean dynasty, which ruled Judea in the 2nd and 1st centuries BCE.

Under Justinian, the Byzantine town in the area was known as Moditha (Ancient Greek: Μωδιθα, romanized: Mōditha).

An ancient Jewish fortified homestead dating from the Hellenistic period through to the Bar Kokhba Revolt has been discovered in the area. Archaeologists discovered what one of them suggested might be an orderly numismatic collection of 16 silver tetradrachms and didrachms (shekels and half-shekels) minted in the city of Tyre during the reign of two Seleucid kings. They further unearthed artifacts and structures from the Hasmonean period, the Great Revolt (66–74 CE) and the Bar Kokhba revolt (132–135 CE), including a rock-hewn hiding complex entered through a mikveh (ritual bath).

Modern Modi'in is located near the site of the ancient Modi'in described in the Talmud, though the specific location is uncertain. Possibilities are Suba near Jerusalem, Umm el-Umdan near Route 20 to Canada Park and Latrun, al-Midya, and Khirbet el-Burj (Titura/Horbat Tittora).

=== Umm el-Umdan ===
Umm el-Umdan is an archaeological hilltop site near the southern Moriah (Buchman) neighbourhood of Maccabim-Reut, towards Latrun Junction. The six main settlement strata excavated date to the Persian, Hellenistic, Roman, Byzantine, and Early Muslim periods. However, the main findings are from a rural settlement from the Hasmonean through to the Early Roman periods. It contains the remains of a synagogue dated to the end of the 2nd-beginning of the 1st century BCE (Hasmonean period), in use until 132 CE (Bar Kokhba Revolt). It has a 1st-century CE mikveh standing next to it.

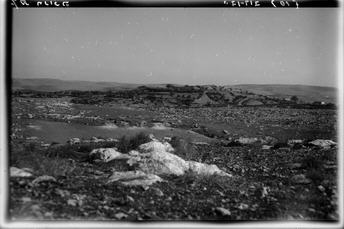
Umm el-Umdan, 1926

=== Titura/Horbat Tittora ===
Horbat Tittora, located on a hill at Modi'in, shows signs of habitation from the Chalcolithic to the Ottoman period, with continuous habitation from the Iron Age II in the First Temple period through to the Byzantine period and some traces from the Early Muslim, Mamluk and Ottoman periods.

==== Crusader castle at Titura ====
The ruins of a Crusader castle have been excavated at Titura/Tittora. The findings from the castle's courtyard, which has also been used as a kitchen, include various kitchenware as well as bronze and silver jewelry lost by the medieval female kitchen staff.

=== Preservation efforts ===
Lack of interest in archaeological sites during the construction of the new city led to the loss of important archaeological vestiges. Through the effort of several individual citizens, similar destruction was averted at Titura and Umm el-Umdan, with authorities taking over the preservation of the surviving sites, while the public actively included the Hasmonean antiquities into their annual Hanukkah rituals.

=== Modern city (est. 1985-1996) ===
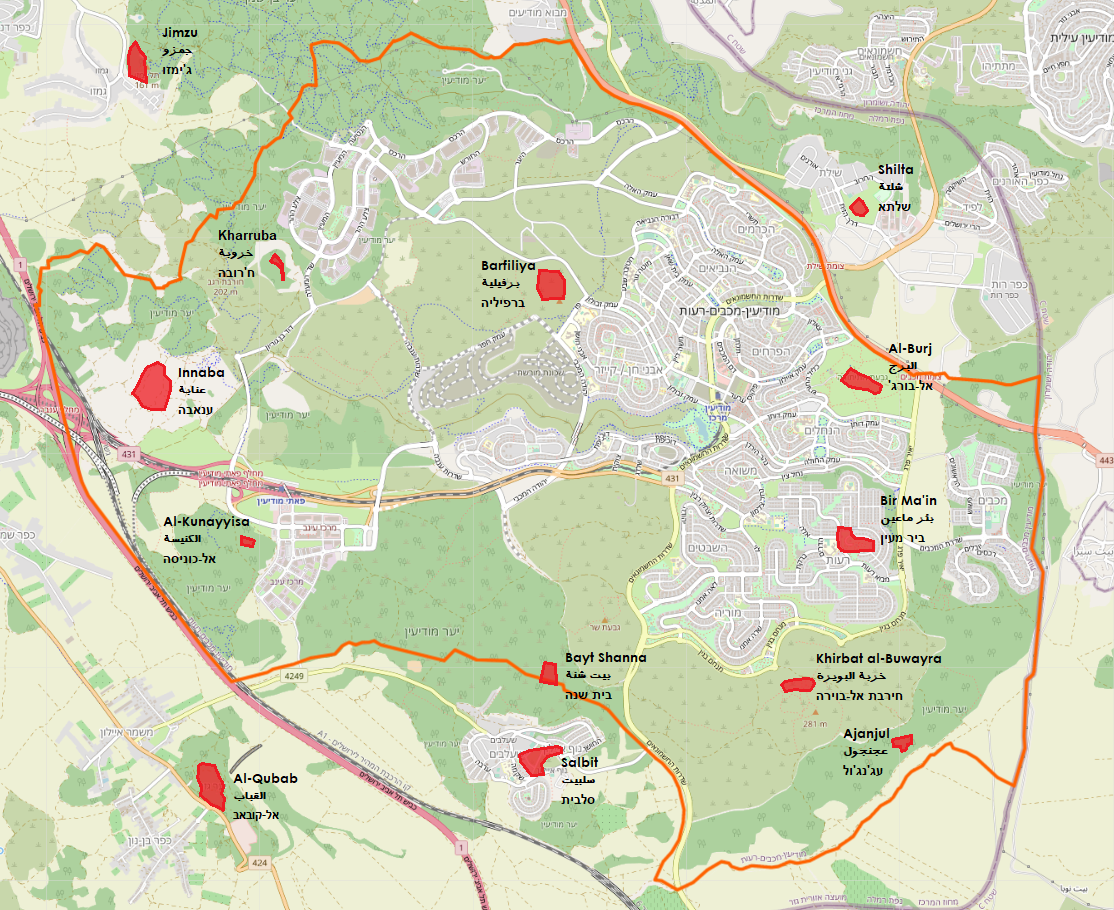
Map of depopulated Palestinian villages within municipal boundaries of Modi'in-Maccabim-Re'ut

The modern city was founded in the late 20th century. The city of Modi'in was built in the 1990s, and it was later merged with the nearby towns of Maccabim and Re'ut, which had been founded in the 1980s, to create the unified municipality of Modi'in-Maccabim-Re'ut. After the 1948 Arab–Israeli War, modern Modi'in-Maccabim-Re'ut's municipal boundary encompasses a number of depopulated Palestinian villages: Ajanjul, Barfiliya, Bayt Shanna, Bir Ma'in, Al-Burj, Innaba, Khirbat al-Buwayra, Kharruba, and Al-Kunayyisa.

In 1985, the construction of the town of Maccabim, which was led by the International Maccabi World Union (MWU) organization began. The project of founding nearby Re'ut, led by an association of Israeli army officers, started in 1987. The towns were united into Maccabim-Re'ut in 1990.

According to ARIJ, Israel confiscated land from two Palestinian villages for the construction of Maccabim, presently part of Modi'in-Maccabim-Re'ut: 1,499 dunams from Beit Sira and 471 dunams from Saffa.

The cornerstone of Modi'in was laid in 1993. It was built as a modern planned city with high standards of urban planning. Environmental issues and future growth were taken into consideration from the early design stages. Large greenspaces were incorporated into the city's layout and comprise 50% of the area within the city limits. The city was opened for residency in 1996. In 2003, the Israeli Ministry of Interior unified Modi'in and Maccabim-Re'ut into a single city.

== Demography ==
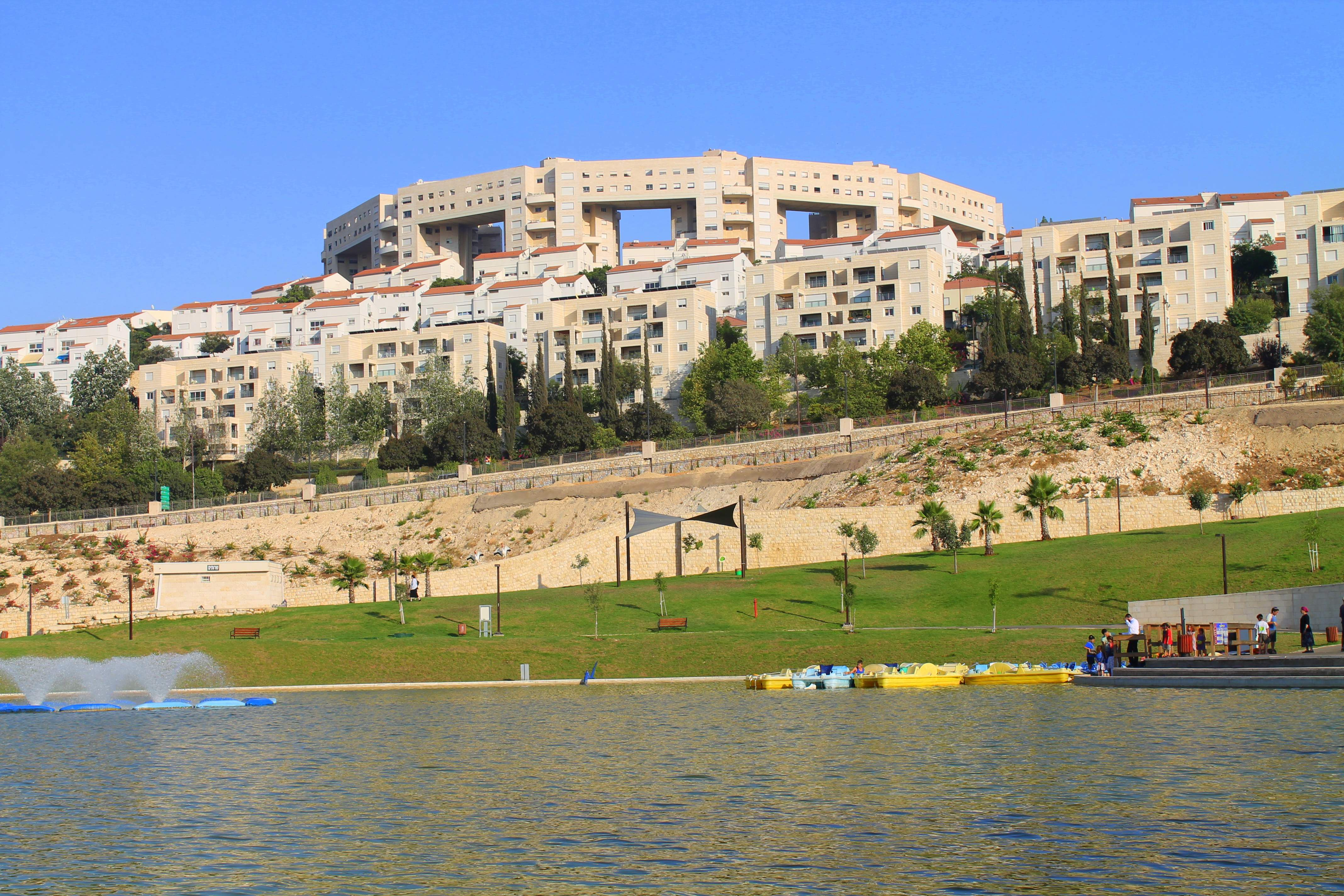
Anava Park

Modi'in has become a magnet for Jerusalem residents displeased with the capital's growing Haredi character. Thousands of residents of Rosh HaAyin, Lod, and Ramla have also relocated to Modi'in. In 2008, it was decided to cap the growth of Modi'in to allow for the development of Lod and Ramla. The city was planned by the well-known architect Moshe Safdie. According to the Israel Central Bureau of Statistics (CBS), the city is rated at level 8 out of 10 on the scale of socio-economic development, with a high proportion of high school graduation, 76.5% (2006–07), and an average monthly income of 9,659 NIS, compared to a national average of 7,466 (2006). Modi'in has attracted a large community of olim (Jewish immigrants) from English-speaking countries.

== Neighborhoods ==
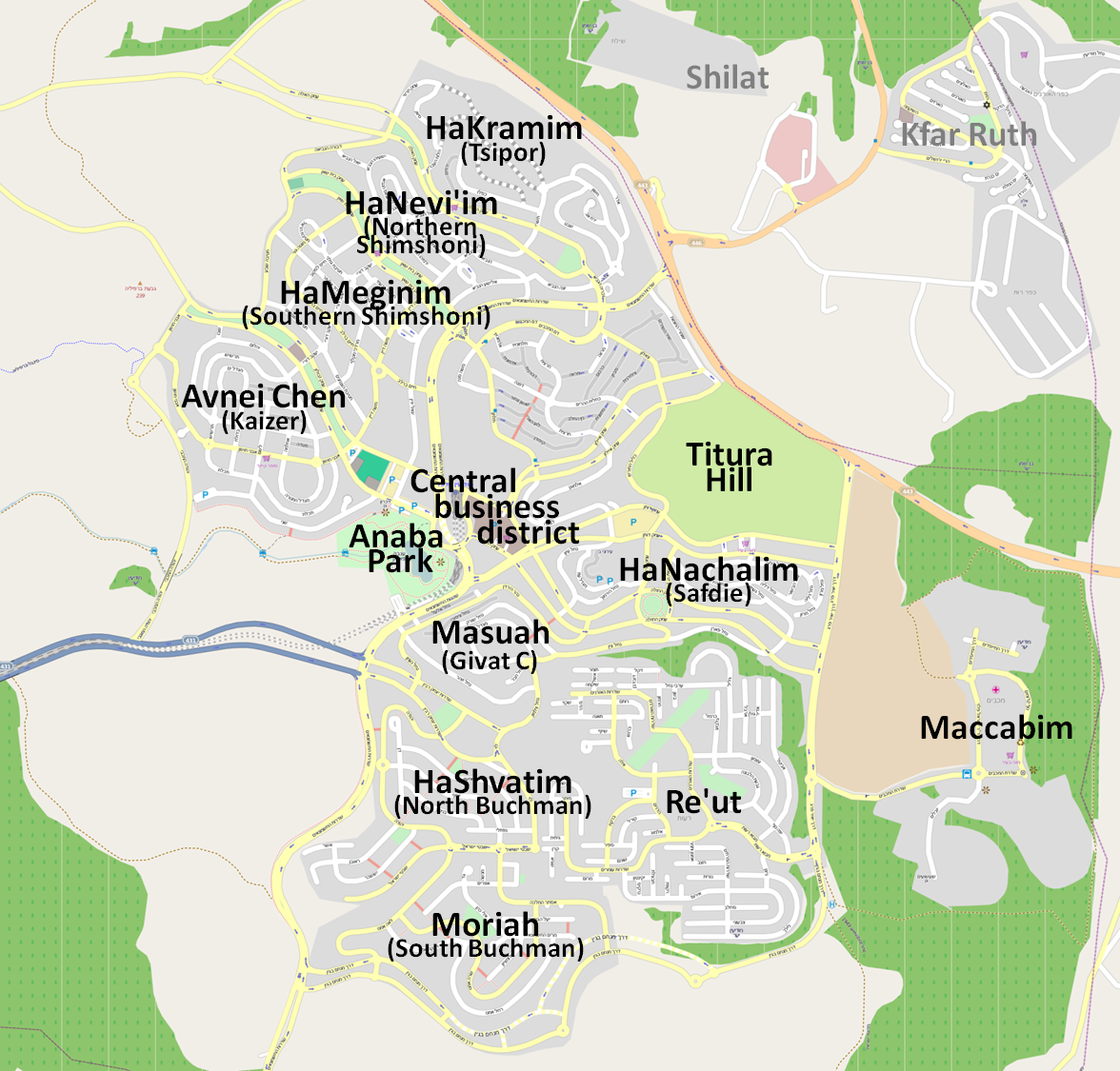
Neighborhoods of Modi'in-Maccabim-Re'ut (2011)

השבטים HaShvatim – The Tribes (North Buchman/Buchman) and מוריה Moriah (South Buchman) are the most southern neighborhoods in the city. Most of the buildings in this neighborhood are ground-level private homes and condos. The streets of Shvatim are named after the tribes of Israel, and the streets of Moriah are named after ancient historical Jewish figures. Moriah, the name of the southern neighborhood, is also a feminine name representing these women.

הפרחים HaPrachim – The Flowers (Miromi) is a small neighborhood in the city center. Located in HaPrachim is a commercial center, two primary schools and a secondary school. The neighborhood's streets are named after trees, flowers, and plants. At the northern part of the neighborhood there is a small compound where the streets are named after phrases from the Song of Songs.

הנחלים HaNechalim – The Rivers (Safdie) and משואה Masuah – Beacon (Givat C) are located towards the west of the city, and were planned by architect Moshe Safdie. Located in these neighborhoods are five commercial centers, a secondary school and three primary schools. The central street names are named after valleys in Israel, and the side streets are named after Israeli rivers and streets. The name "Masuah" was selected in order to represent the neighborhood's high altitude. Within the area consisting of the streets named after rivers and streams is the "Malibu" area, which, as with other areas, is colloquially named after the contractor who designed the neighborhood.

הכרמים HaKramim – The Vineyards (Tsipor) is the northernmost neighborhood in Modi'in. The streets are named after the Hebrew months. The name "Kramim" is in honor of the vineyards that were located where the neighborhood now stands before the city was founded.

אבני חן Avnei Chen – Precious Stones (Kaizer) is located towards the west of the city, and parts of it are still under construction. The main road is named "Avnei Choshen" and leads to the only retail under residential mixed use buildings in Modi'in. Other streets, in keeping with the neighborhood's name, are named for precious stones. The parks are connected through the center of the neighborhood and allow pedestrians to cross. A bike lane in the Emek Zvuloon street leads to the center of town.

הנביאים HaNevi'im – The Prophets (Northern Shimshoni) and המגינים HaMeginim – The Defenders (Southern Shimshoni) are located towards the northwest of the city. Streets in HaNevi'im are named for the Prophets of Israel, while HaMeginim's streets are named after generals and important battles in Israeli history. Located in the neighborhoods are three commercial centers, three primary schools, and one secondary school.

הציפורים HaTsiporim – The Birds (South Kaizer) is still being planned. Its streets will be named after different species of birds, and will be a relatively small neighborhood consisting of only seven streets.

== Urban development ==
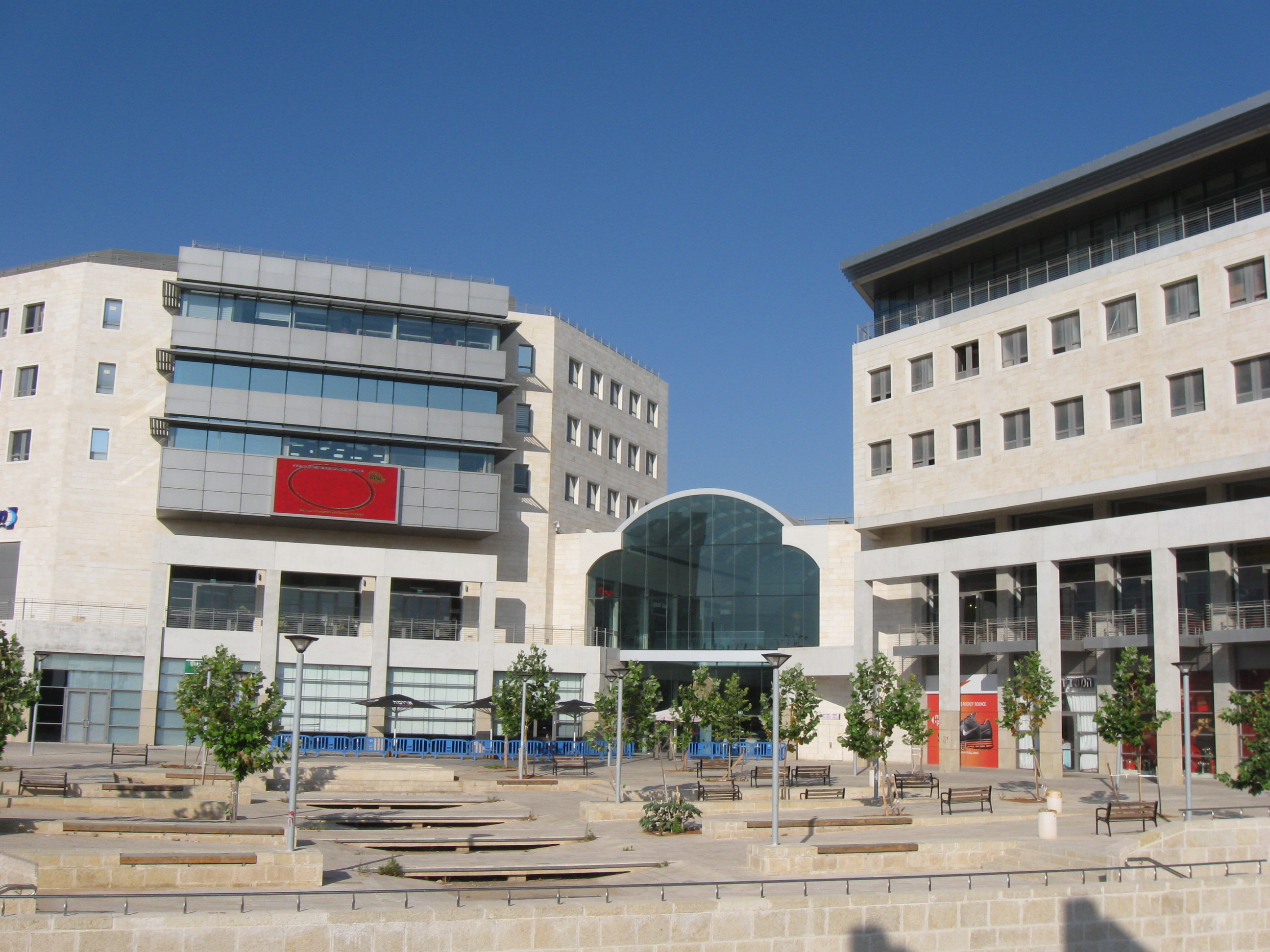
Azrieli Modi'in Mall

The long-term projection of the Israeli Ministry of Construction and Housing is for the city to be home to 240,000 residents. However, plans approved thus far are for 120,000 residents. The original city of Modi'in is laid out around a central hub, with the main arterial spokes organized as dual carriageways. Each side of the artery is a one-way street, and in between is a wide green space, with linear parks, playgrounds, schools, and some small commercial centers. Short lateral stubs fed by continuous-flow intersection turn lanes allow drivers to traverse the green spaces and effect a U-turn onto the artery's opposite direction lanes. These stubs also serve as the entranceways for the schools and mini-malls, preventing parking traffic from blocking the high-speed, left lanes of the arteries. The right shoulders of most arteries do, however, allow parking, except in the pullouts for bus stops, next to fire hydrants, etc.

The city center is a large traffic circle punctuated by traffic lights. On the north side of the circle is the central train station, to the northeast is the Azrieli Modi'in Mall, and to the west and south is the Anava Park, which contains a small artificial lake used for recreational boating. The traffic circle straddles a major northeast–southwest artery, HaHashmonaim Boulevard, that connects to the southwest with Route 431 (which has its eastern terminus in south Modi'in and extends west to Rishon LeZion), and to the northeast with Route 443 (at Shilat Junction) providing connectivity to Jerusalem (southeast) and Lod (northwest).

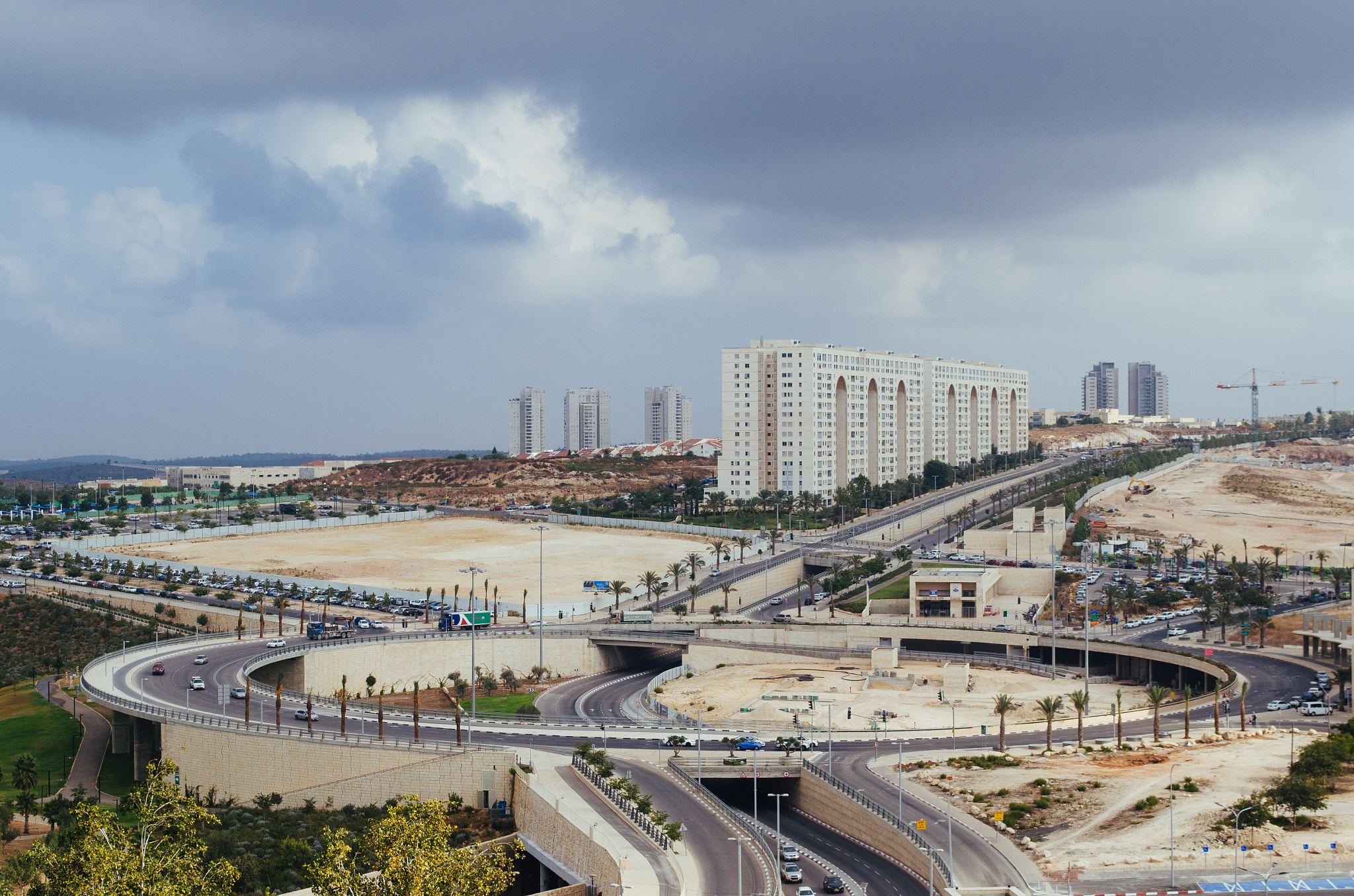
Transportation Square

Approximately 5 km (3 miles) west-northwest of the city center is an industrial zone, and to the west (on route 431) is the Yishpro commercial center. The latter is also accessible via an additional Modi'in train station, Paatei Modi'in. The industrial zone is also linked to route 443 via its own interchange, between Shilat Junction and the Maccabim Junction at the eastern side of the Ben Shemen Forest. This keeps most of the commercial traffic out of the city proper, so that the two arteries between the city and its industrial zone (Emek HaEla and HaShdera Hamerkazit) carry primarily commuters rather than trucks.

=== Controversy ===
In 2012, the European Union (EU), reclassified the small part of Modi'in originally founded as the community of Maccabim as an Israeli settlement since it had been established in the no man's land according to the 1949 Armistice Agreements. The effect of this redefinition was to deny the affected area (which is exclusively green-leaf residential) a range of preferential tax benefits that would normally be conceded on Israeli products exported to Europe. The decision was made to implement a 2010 ruling of the Court of Justice of the European Union (CJEU). The move sparked a diplomatic controversy.

== Culture ==
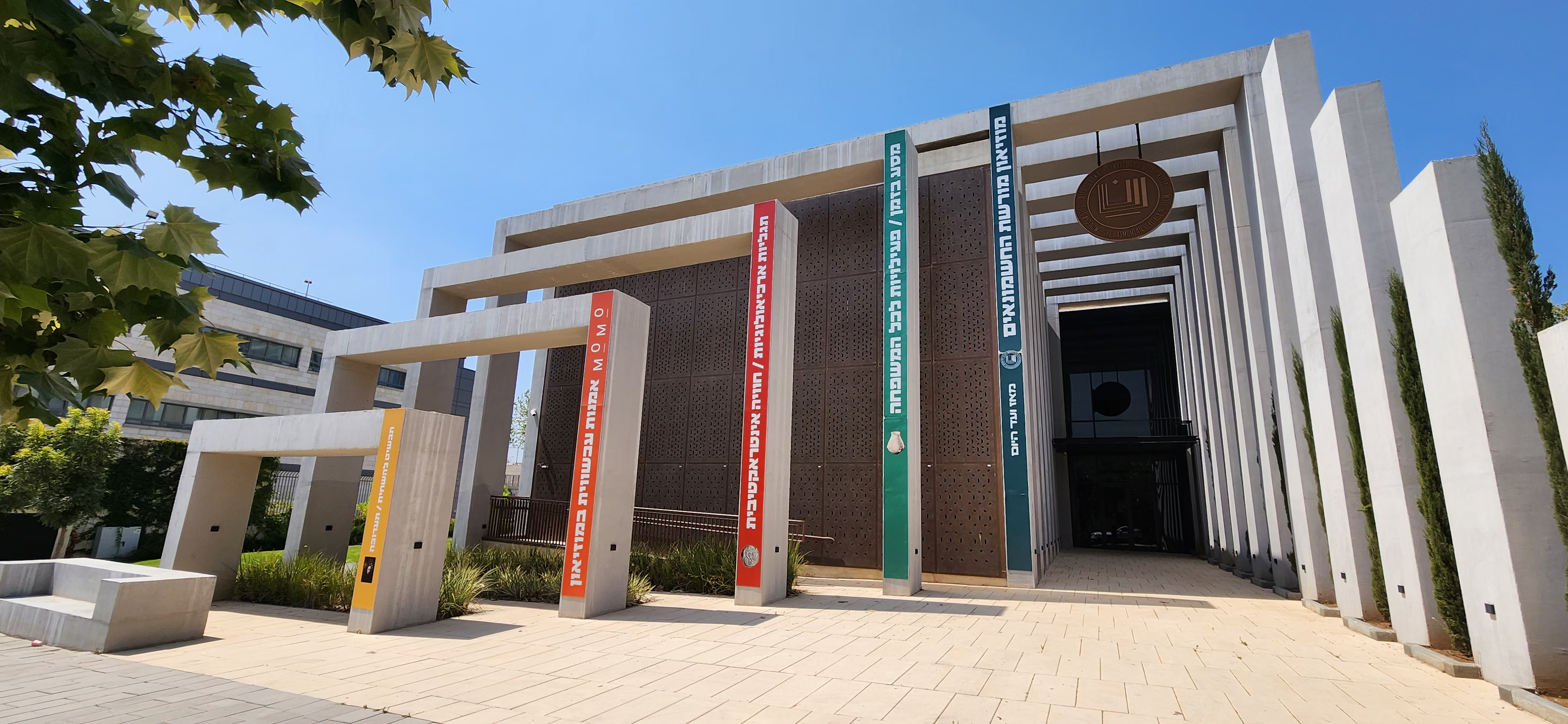
Hasmonean Heritage Museum

In 2007, Modi'in was selected as one of the inaugural cities for the Israel Baseball League. The baseball team was named the Modi'in Miracle, but did not play games in Modi'in as there is no baseball stadium there.

In 2008, the Pioneers of the Israel Football League, playing American Football, relocated to Modi'in, where the Pioneers played all their home games. In their first season, the Modi'in "Dancing Camel" Pioneers won the 2008-2009 Israel Bowl, with a 38–26 win in double overtime against the Jerusalem Lions. After an unsuccessful 2009–10 season, their second in Modi'in, the Pioneers relocated once again to Tel Aviv, where most of the team's players lived.

== Transportation ==
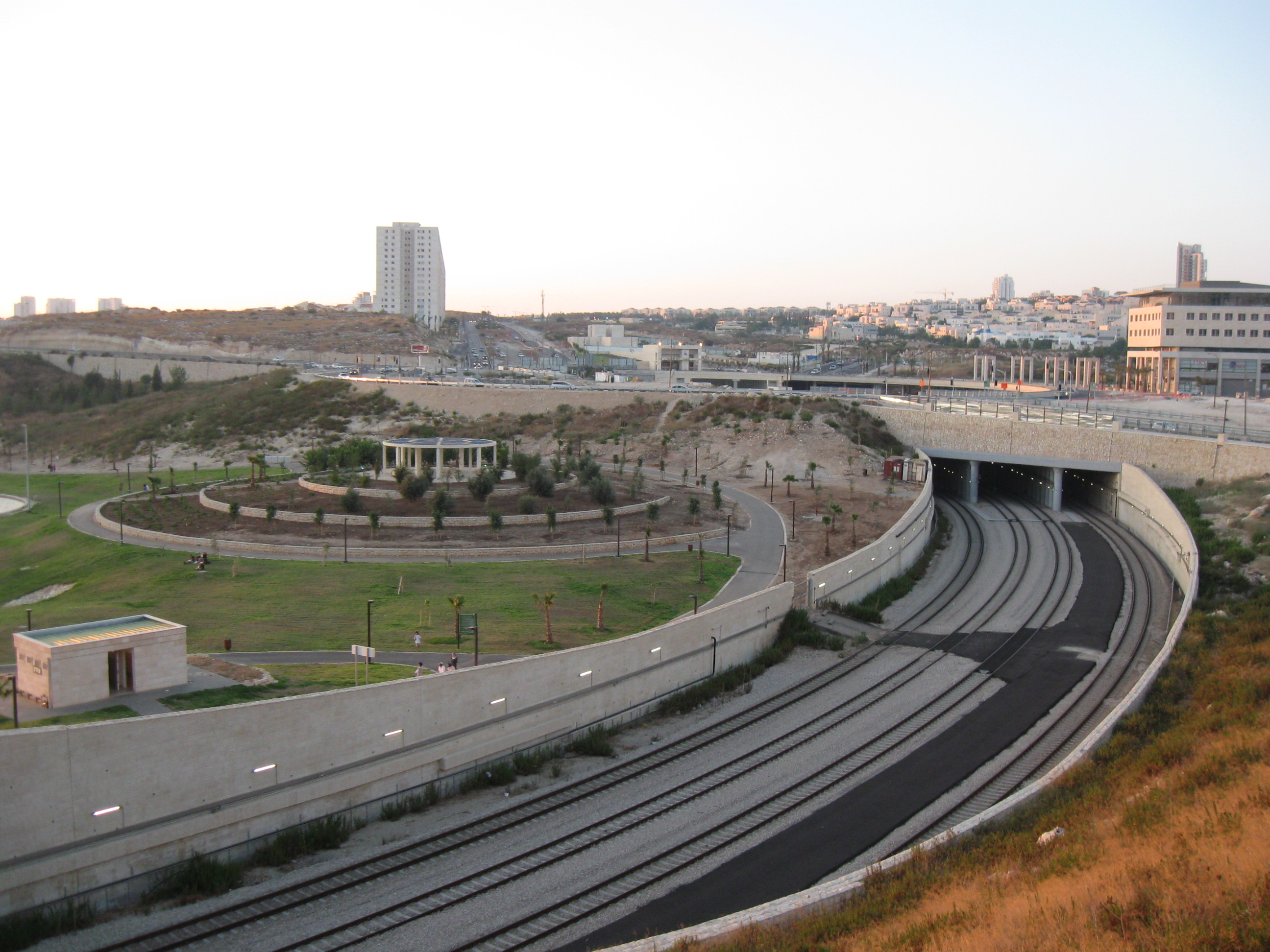
Modi'in central railway station

Modi'in-Maccabim-Re'ut is accessible by Highway 431, Highway 3 and Road 443. An Israel Railways line began operation on April 1, 2008, to a large underground station in Modi'in.

Service began in September 2007 to Paatei Modi'in on the western outskirts of the city. This railway connects Modi'in to Tel Aviv by way of Ben Gurion Airport. The line to Modi'in is a spur off the Tel Aviv–Jerusalem railway. Intercity and local bus services are provided by Kavim.

== Voting Patterns ==
In the 2022 election, 60 percent of voters in Modi'in-Maccabim-Re'ut voted for the parties of the center-left coalition led by Yair Lapid, while 36 percent voted for the parties of the right-wing coalition led by Benjamin Netanyahu and 0.2 percent voted for the Arab parties.

In the 2026 election, 61 percent of voters in Modi'in-Maccabim-Re'ut voted for the parties of the center-left coalition led by Gadi Eisenkot, while 30 percent voted for the parties of the right-wing coalition led by Benjamin Netanyahu and 0.3 percent voted for the Arab parties. An additional 4.8 percent voted for the Reservists, and 4.1 percent voted for Amcha Yisrael. Voter turnout increased 23 percent from the 2022 election.

== Notable people ==
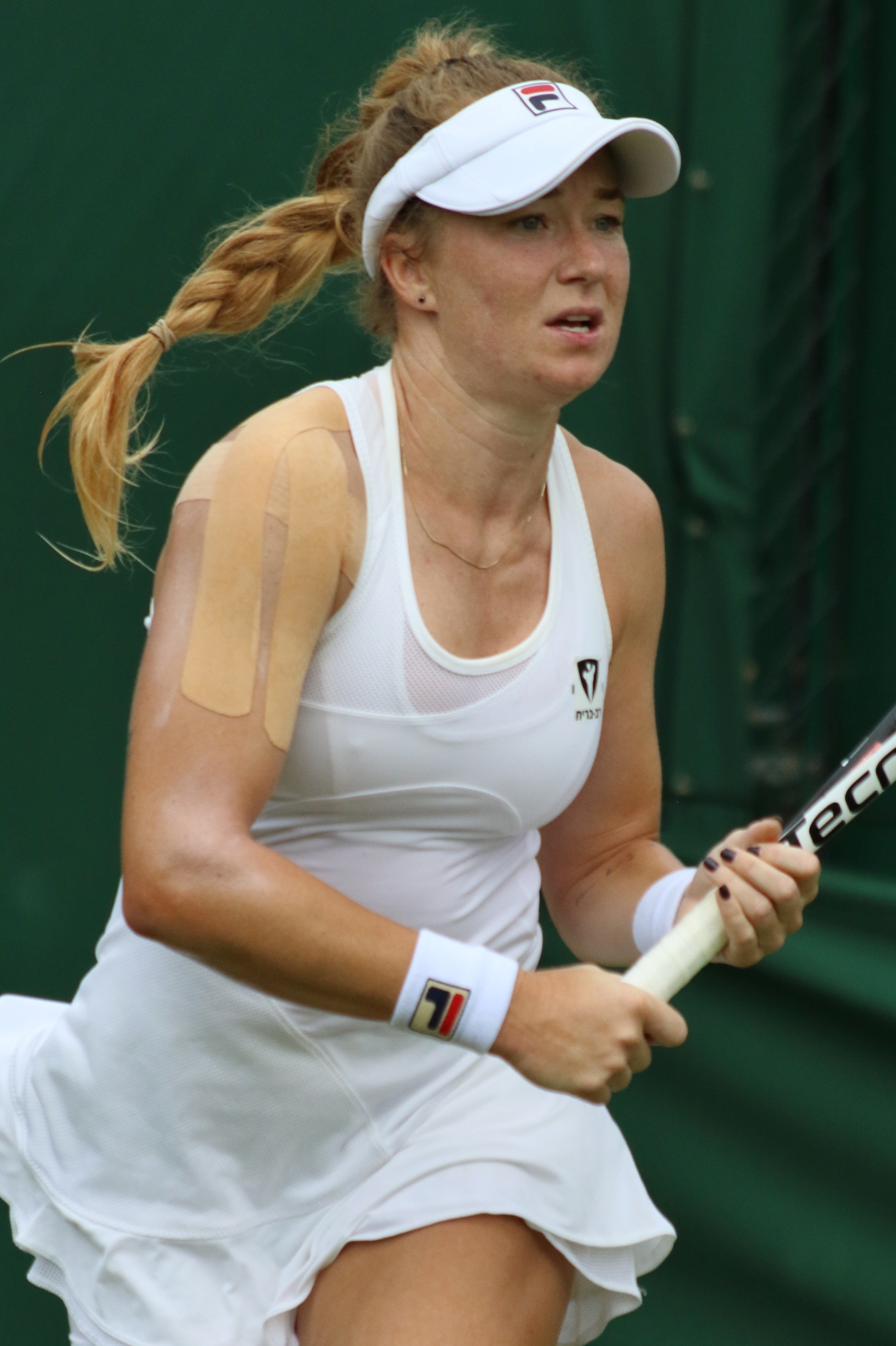
Julia Glushko

- Mattanya Cohen (born 1965), diplomat
- Yohanan Danino (born 1959), former chief of the Israel Police
- Itamar Einhorn (born 1997), professional cyclist
- Rotem Gafinovitz (born 1992), professional cyclist
- Julia Glushko (born 1990), tennis player
- David Lau (born 1966), former Ashkenazi Chief Rabbi of Israel
- Yariv Levin (born 1969), lawyer and politician
- Shahar Pe'er (born 1987), tennis player
- Mark Regev (born 1960), diplomat, government advisor and civil servant
- Ben Sahar (born 1989), association football player
- Moshe Ya'alon (born 1950), politician and former IDF Chief of Staff

== International relations ==
=== Twin towns—Sister cities ===
Modi'in-Maccabim-Re'ut is twinned with:

- Hagen, Germany
- Banja Luka, Bosnia and Herzegovina
- Haikou, China
