= Lapid (community settlement) =

Community settlement in central Israel

Lapid: לַפִּיד (Hebrew)
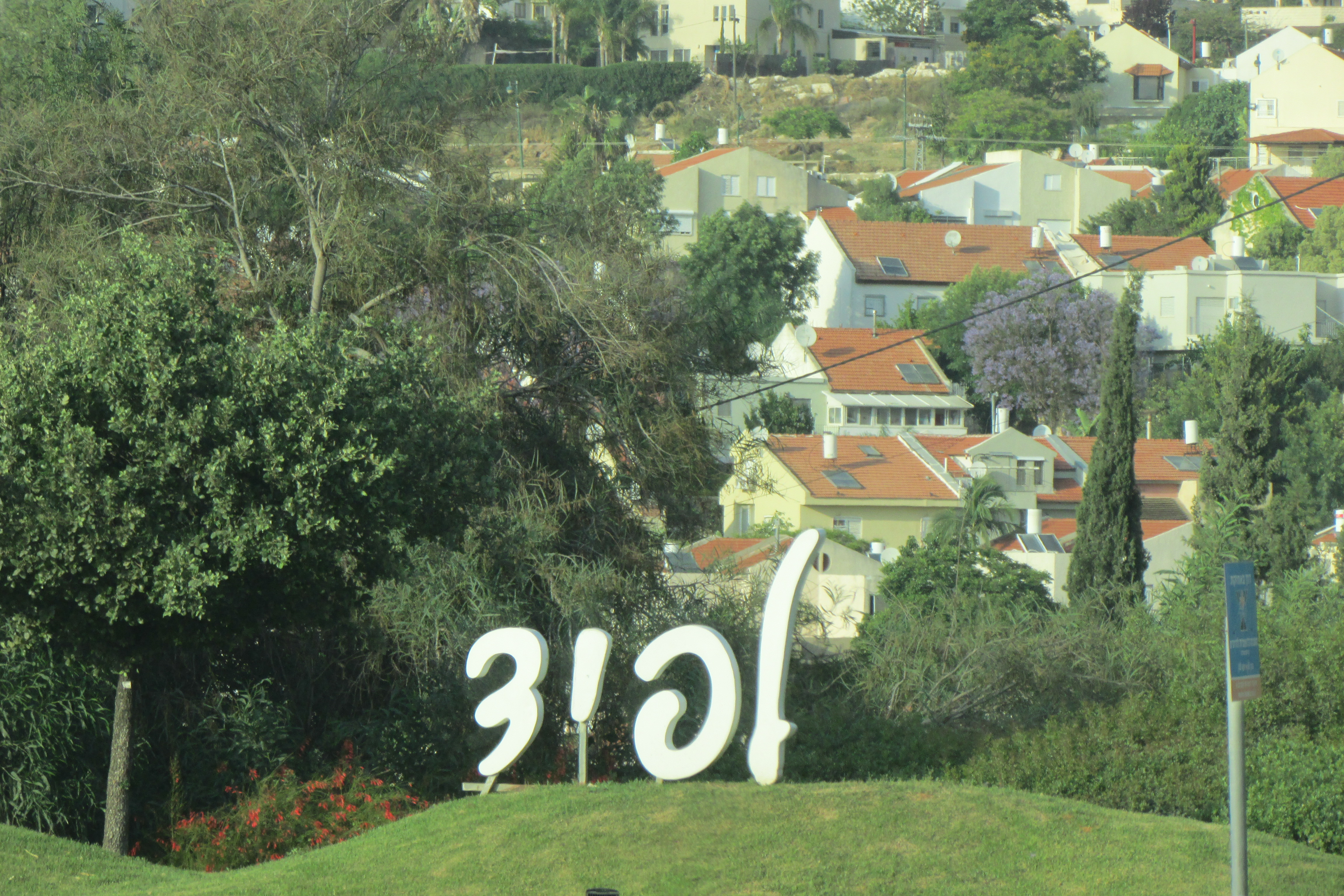

- Location within Central Israel
- Coordinates: 31°54′59″N 35°1′59″E
- Country: Israel
- District: Central
- Subdistrict: Ramla
- Council: Hevel Modi'in
- Founded: 1996
- Population (2024): 2,001

Lapid (Hebrew: לַפִּיד, lit. 'Torch') is an Israeli community settlement. Located in the Latrun salient of the Green Line near Modi'in Illit, it falls under the jurisdiction of Hevel Modi'in Regional Council. In 2024 it had a population of 2,001.

== History ==
Lapid was established in 1996. According to B'Tselem, it was built on a strip of land designated no man's land inside the Green Line. Before the Six-Day War in 1967, this territory did not belong to either Jordan or Israel.

According to ARIJ, Israel confiscated 441 dunams of land from the Palestinian village of Saffa after 1967 for the construction of Lapid.
