= Kfar Ruth =

Israeli moshav in the former no-man's land between Israel and the West Bank

Kfar Ruth: כְּפַר רוּת (Hebrew)
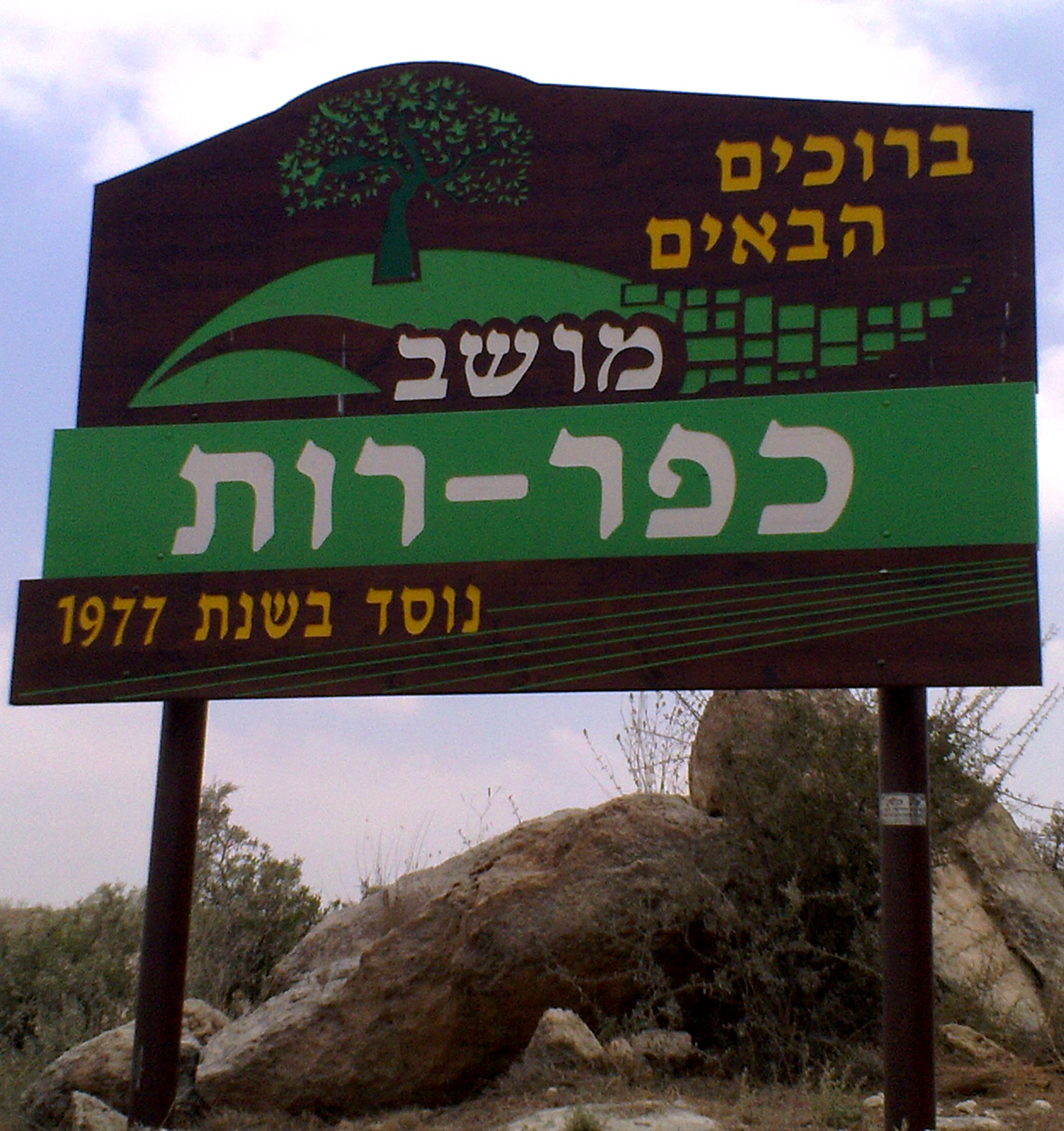

- Location within Central Israel
- Coordinates: 31°54′36″N 35°2′8″E
- Country: Israel
- District: Central
- Subdistrict: Ramla
- Council: Hevel Modi'in
- Affiliation: Moshavim Movement
- Founded: 1977
- Population (2024): 402

Kfar Ruth (Hebrew: כְּפַר רוּת, lit. 'Ruth's Village') is an Israeli moshav located east of Modi'in. It was established in 1977 in an area that had become a no-man's land between Israel and Jordanian-controlled West Bank at the end of the 1948 Arab–Israeli War, before coming under the control of Israel during the Six-Day War. It falls under the jurisdiction of Hevel Modi'in Regional Council and had a population of 402 in 2024.

== History ==
The settlement was established in 1977 and was named after the ancient village of Capheruta that appears on the Madaba Map. Capheruta is identified with the adjacent Khirbet Kafr Lut. Prior to the 1948 Arab–Israeli War, the Palestinian village of al-Burj, which was depopulated in the war, was located nearby. According to ARIJ, after the 1967 Six-Day War, Israel confiscated 814 dunams of land from the Palestinian village of Saffa for the construction of Kfar Ruth.

== Economy ==
According to archeologists, grapes were grown in the region by the inhabitants of Modi'in. Tal Maor, a resident of Kfar Ruth, has revived the age-old tradition of winemaking through the establishment of a family winery, Ruth Vineyard.
