= Barfiliya =

Barfiliya برفيلية Barfilia, Barfilya, Berfilya, Berfilia
- Former village
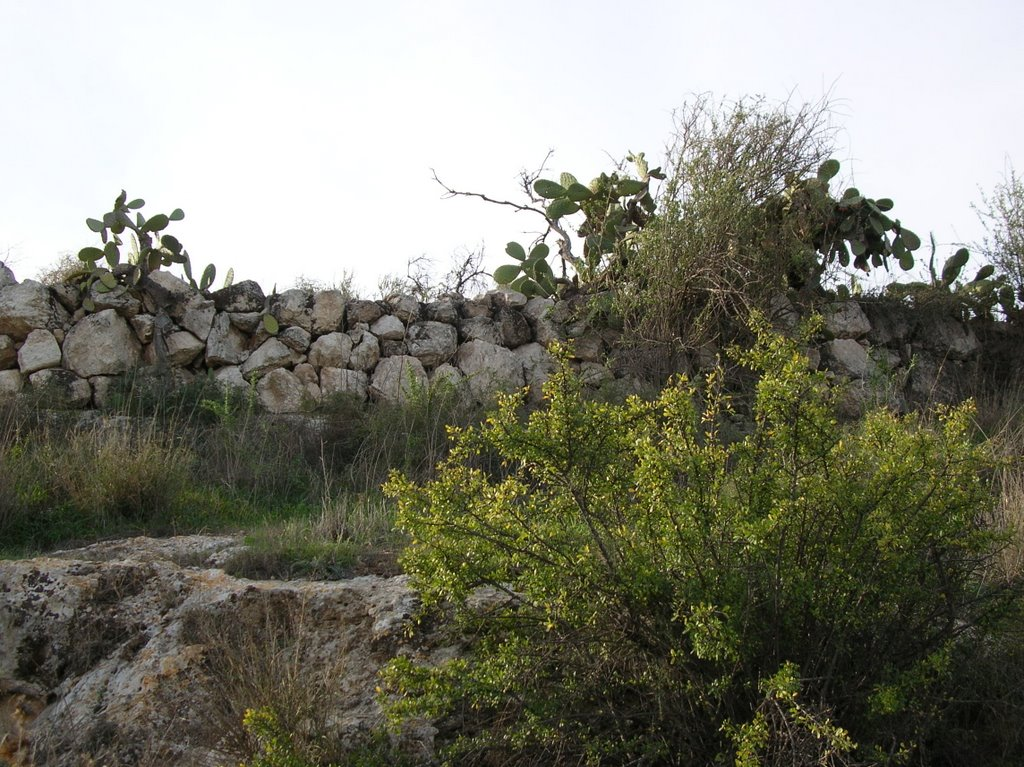
- Ruins of the village, 2008
- Etymology: a personal name
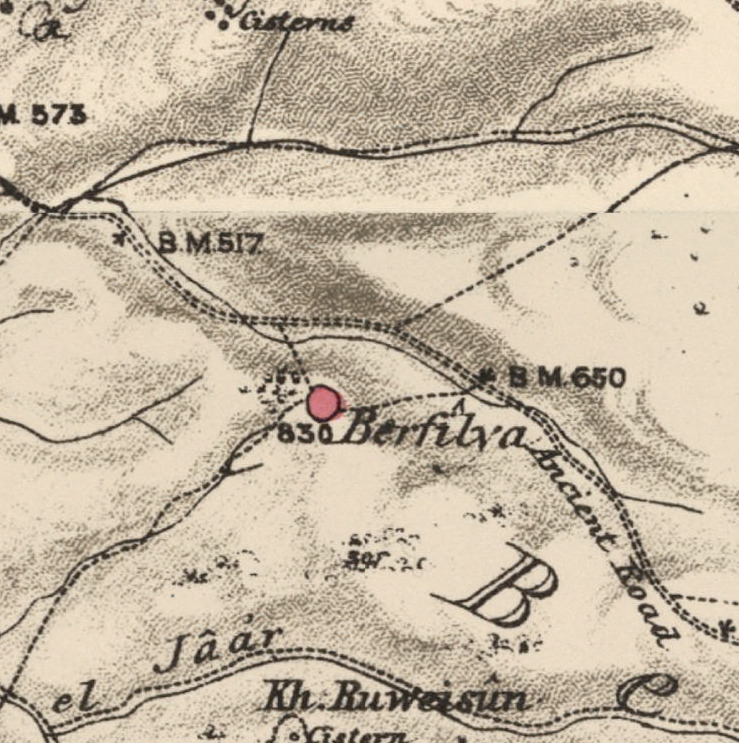
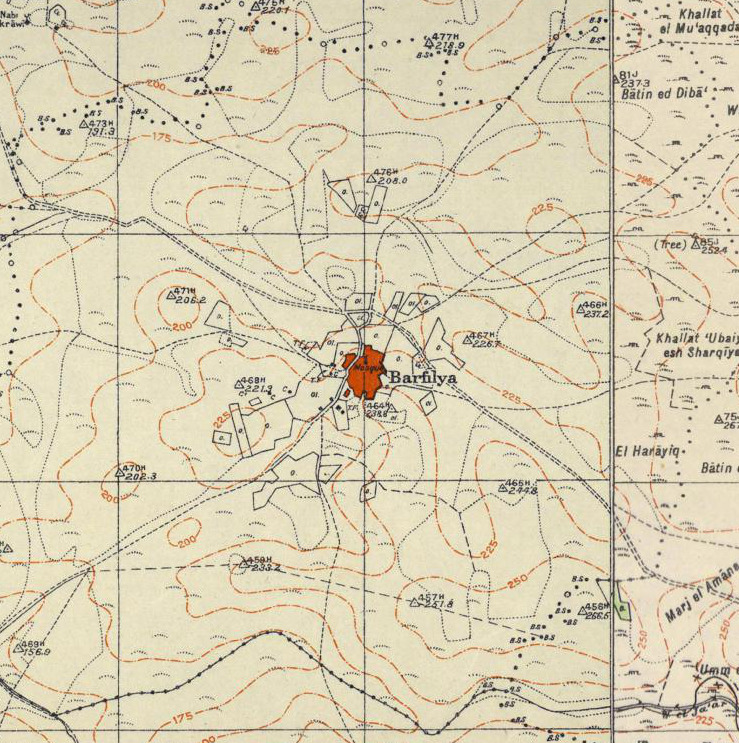
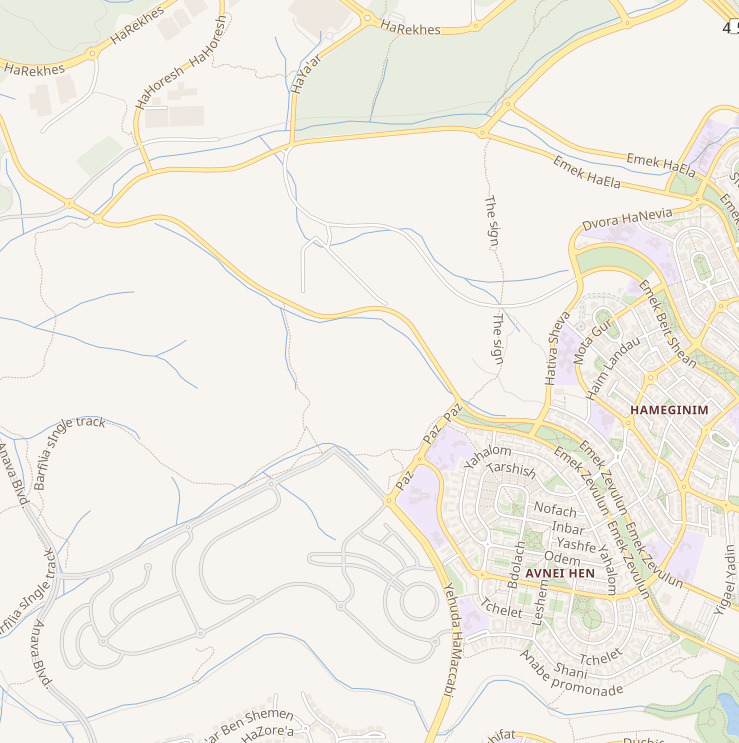
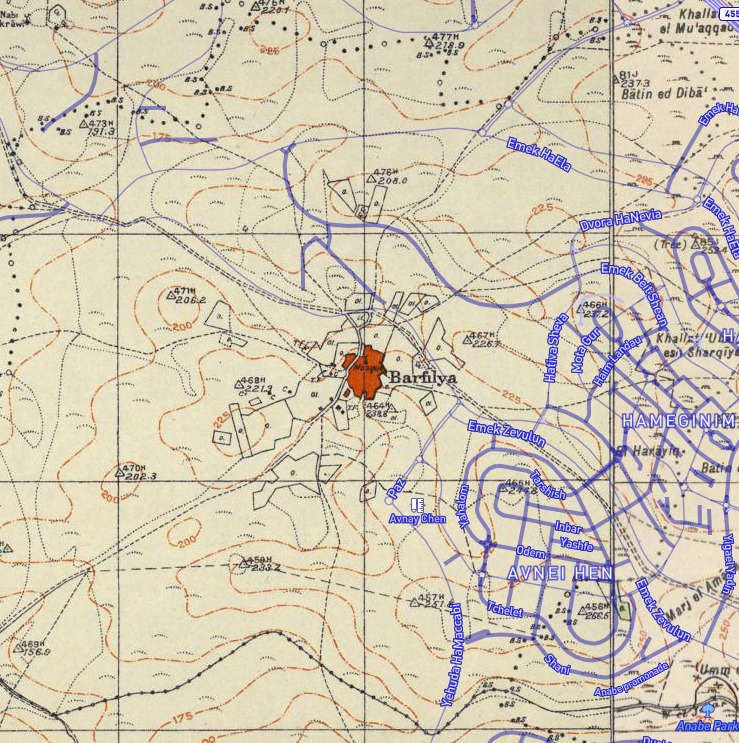
- 1870s map 1940s map modern map 1940s with modern overlay map A series of historical maps of the area around Barfiliya (click the buttons)

- Location within Mandatory Palestine
- Coordinates: 31°54′39″N 34°59′18″E
- Palestine grid: 149/146
- Geopolitical entity: Mandatory Palestine
- Subdistrict: Ramle
- Date of depopulation: July 14, 1948

Area
  - Total: 7,134 dunams (7.134 km^{2}; 2.754 sq mi)

Population (1945)
  - Total: 730
- Cause(s) of depopulation: Military assault by Yishuv forces
- Current Localities: Military firing range

Barfiliya (Arabic: برفيلية) was a Palestinian village located 10.5 kilometres (6.5 mi) east of Ramla that was depopulated during the 1948 Arab–Israeli War. Located on a tell, excavations conducted there by Israeli archaeologists beginning in 1995 found artifacts dating back to the Pre-Pottery Neolithic A (PPNA) period (circa 9,500-8,000 BCE).

Barfiliya lay on a road between Jerusalem and Lydda that was built in Roman times. In the early Ottoman era, it was a small village of 44 inhabitants. By 1945, before the end of the Mandatory Palestine and the outbreak of 1948 Arab–Israeli War, its population had grown to 730. Depopulated on July 14, 1948, Barifiliya was subsequently destroyed.

== Etymology ==
Barfīlyā /Barfīlya/ is a Greek place name, derived from Πορφυρίων/Πορφυρεών, which was the name of a mythological king, based on the word for “purple-fish”. The name is recorded in its Greek form in Crusader documents: Porphilia. By 1552, it was known in its modern Arabic form.

== Geography ==
Barfiliya was located in Wadi Jaar, along with the villages of Annabeh, Al-Burj, and Bir Main. A high road between Jerusalem and Jaffa ran through Barfiliya and Lydda, after passing the Plain of Ajalon and crossing the Beth Horon roads.

== History ==
=== Roman period ===
During the rule of the Roman Empire in Palestine, a road was built that connected Lydda to Jerusalem and passed through Barfiliya and other villages like Beit Liqya, Biddu and Beit Iksa.

=== Crusader period ===
The Crusaders knew Barfiliya by the name Porfylia or Porphiria. Under their rule, it was one of five villages to make up the diocese of Lydda. The village came to belong to the prior and canons of the Holy Sepulchre in November 1136, granted permission to build a church there by their bishop in 1170–1, it is unknown if they ever did in fact do so. The first Crusader Kingdom of Jerusalem, which ruled over most of Palestine, came to an end after the victory of Saladin's forces over those of the Crusaders in the 1187 Battle of Hattin.

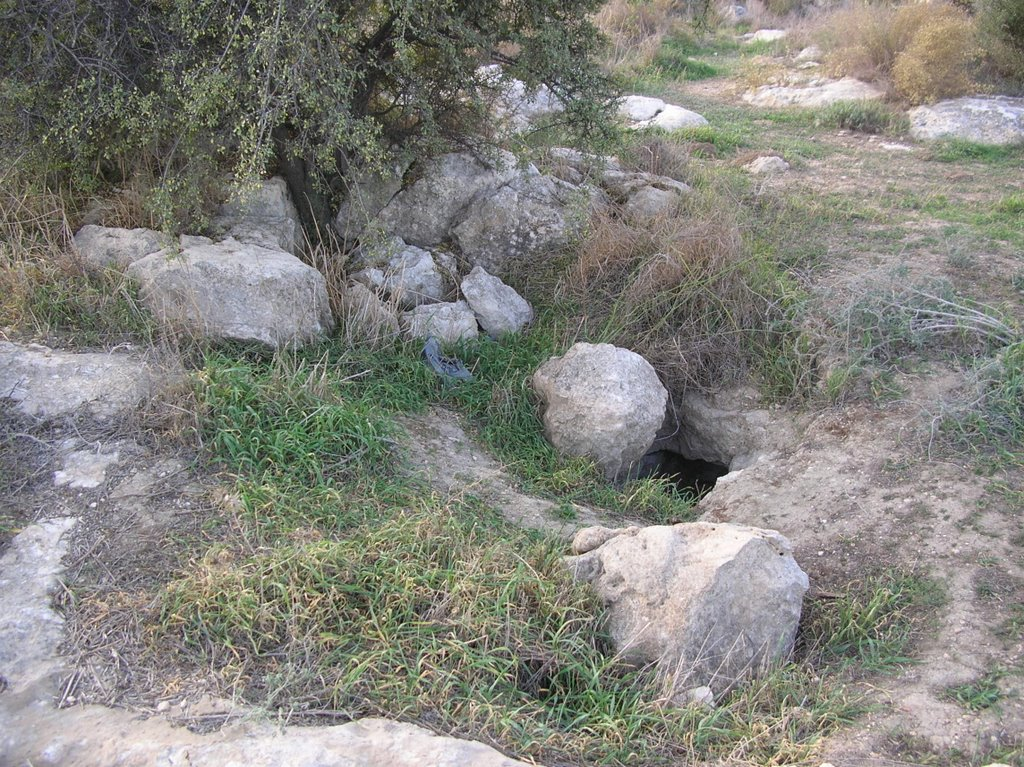
Village ruins today

=== Ottoman period ===
Barfiliya, like the rest of Palestine, was ruled by the Ottoman Empire between 1517 and 1917/18. In 1596, the village formed part of the nahiya (subdistrict) of al-Ramla under the liwa' (district) of Gaza. It had a population of 8 households, an estimated 44 persons, all Muslim. Villagers paid a fixed tax rate of 25% on agricultural products, including wheat, barley, sesame and fruit, as well as goats, beehives and vineyards and occasional revenues; a total of 6,000 akçe.

In 1838, it was noted as a Muslim village, Burfilia, in the Ibn Humar area in the District of Er-Ramleh. In 1863, Victor Guérin found the village to have 150 inhabitants.

An official Ottoman village list of about 1870 showed that "Berfilija" had 28 houses and a population of 175, though the population count included only men. In the late 19th century, Barfiliya is described as a small hamlet, situated on a slope, 2,000 feet (610 m) above a valley. The villagers cultivated olives.

During the Sinai and Palestine Campaign of World War I, in the lead up to the 1917 Battle of El Burj, the Australian Light Horse Brigades led by Major-General Hodgson reached Barfiliya on November 28–29 in an effort to relieve Commonwealth troops in their battles against German and Turkish troops.

=== British Mandate ===
After the war's end, the Ottoman Empire was partitioned and a Palestine mandate was accorded to Britain by the League of Nations. In a census conducted in 1922 by the British Mandate authorities, Barfilia had a population of 411 residents; all Muslims, increasing in the 1931 census to 544, still all Muslims, in a total of 132 houses.

Still under Mandatory rule in the 1945 statistics, the village comprised a total area of 7,134 dunums, and the population was entirely Muslim. A large number of inhabitants were employed in cereal farming. However, some land was allocated to irrigation and plantation as well as the growing of olives.

Types of land use in dunams by Arabs in 1945:

Land Usage	Dunams
Irrigated & Plantation	241
Olives	191
Cereal	2,739
Urban	17
Cultivable	2,980
Non-cultivable	4,137

The land ownership of the village before occupation in dunams:

Owner	Durnams
Arab	7,130
Jewish	0
Public	4
Total	7,134

17 dunams were classified as built-up public areas.

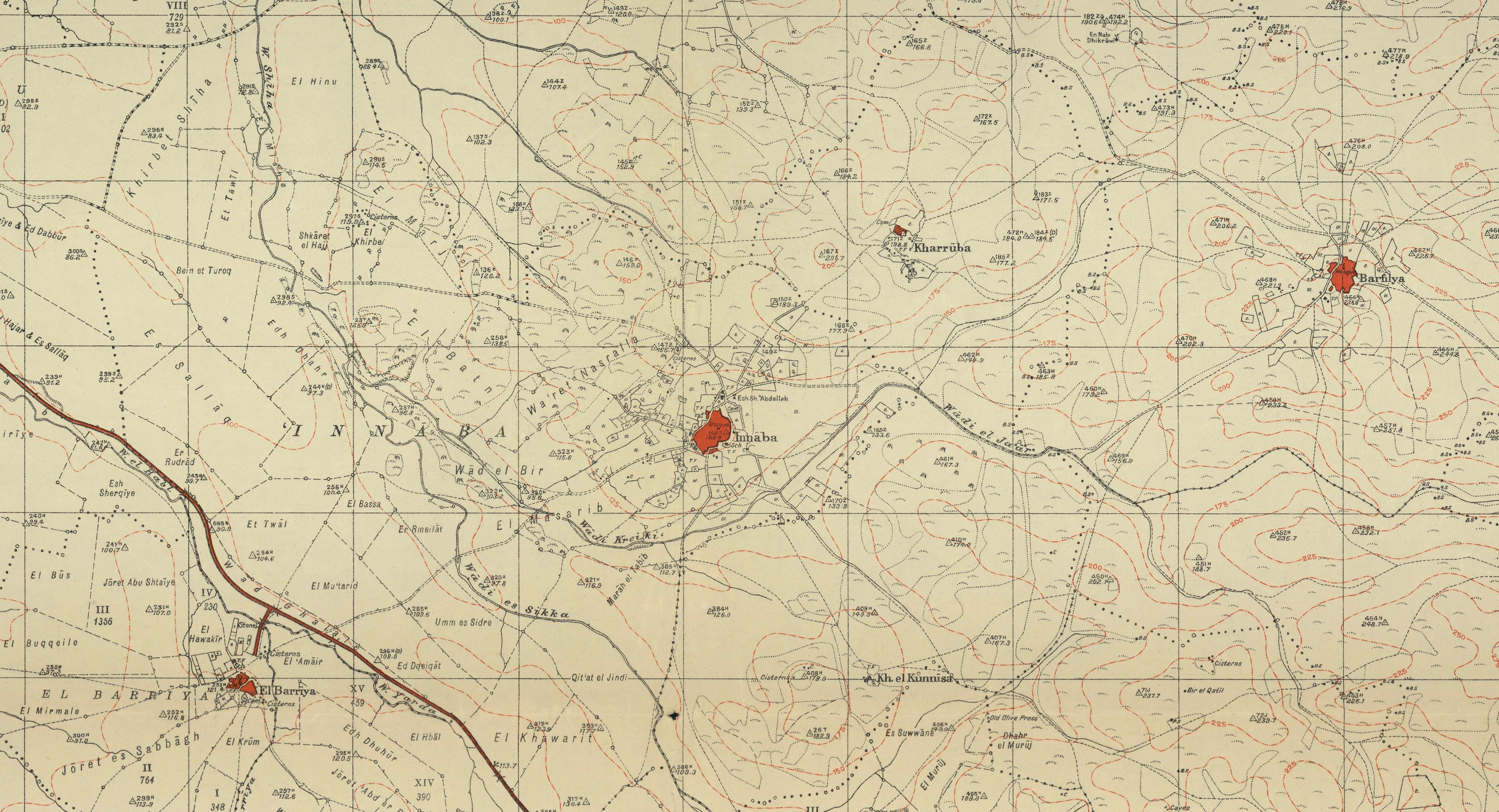
Barfiliya 1942 1:20,000

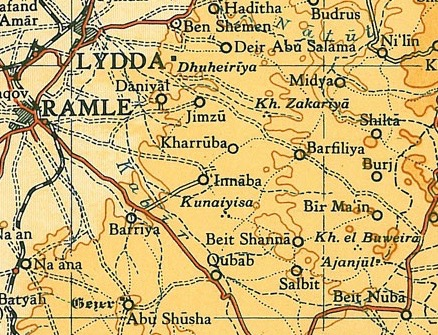
Barfiliya 1945 1:250,000

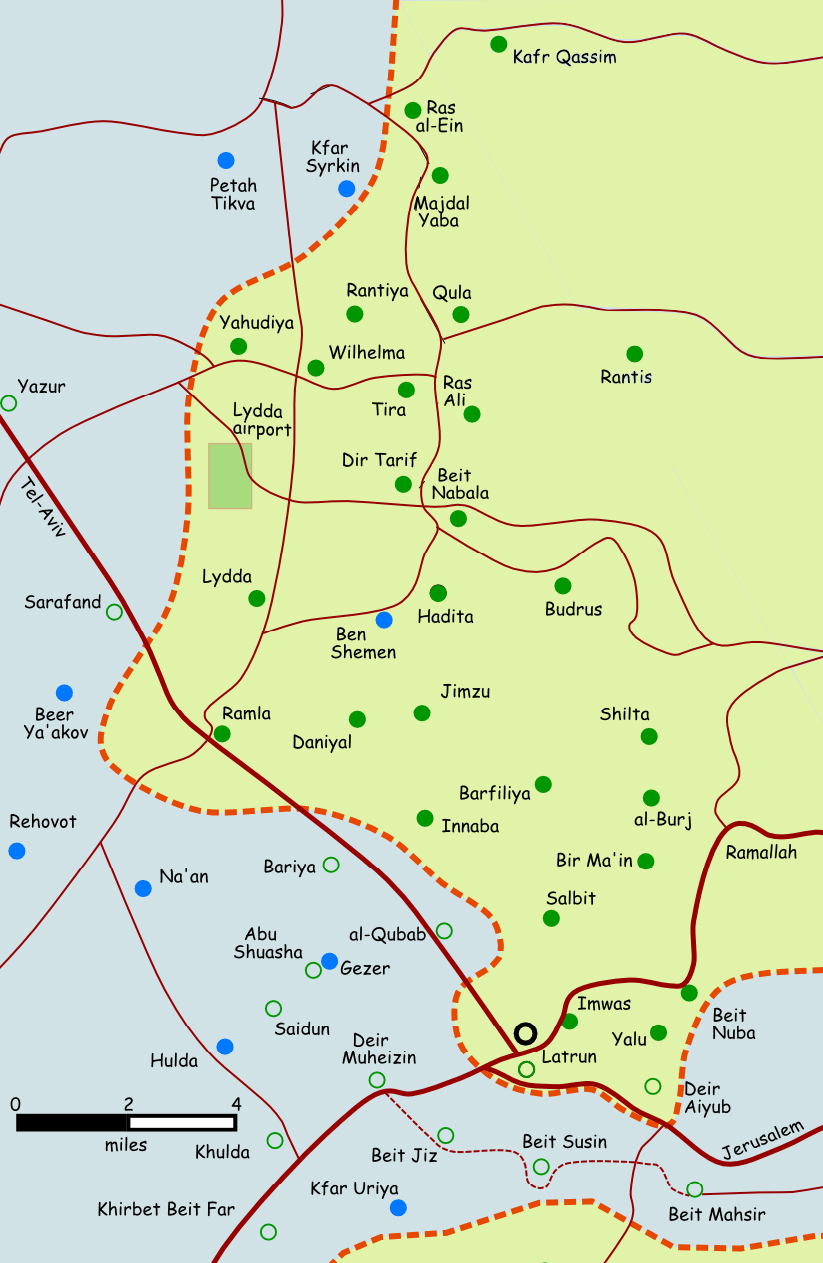
Palestinian villages depopulated in the area around Lydda and Ramla (coloured in green)

=== 1948 war and aftermath ===
During the 1948 Arab–Israeli War, Barfiliya briefly became a destination for Palestinian refugees from Lydda. One survivor of the 1948 Palestinian expulsion from Lydda and Ramle, Haj As'ad Hassouneh, reports that when Jews came to Lydda in July 1948, they called the people together and told them to, "Go to Barfiliya," where the Arab Legion was still stationed. Only one or two knew where Barfiliya was, and though the distance could usually be travelled in about 4 hours, it took the group made up of men, women, children, the elderly, the sick, among others, three days to make the journey. In the hot, dry summer, without adequate provisions, many died of thirst along the way.

Barfiliya itself was depopulated as a result of a military assault by Israeli forces on July 14, 1948. It was captured by the 8th Armoured Brigade and by elements of the Kiryati Brigade along with other villages in the area north of the Latrun enclave. On September 13, David Ben-Gurion requested the destruction of Barfiliya, among other Palestinian villages whose inhabitants fled or were expelled. All 58 Palestinian villages in the al-Ramla district that came under Israeli control were depopulated in 1948, and those mentioned in Ben-Gurion's memorandum were either partially or totally destroyed.

== Archaeology ==
The village of Barfiliya stood on a large tell, considered one potential site for ancient Be'eroth (the other possibilities being the tells of Daniyal or Simzu). Since 1995, Shimon Gibson and Egon Lass have conducted salvage excavations in the hills of Modi'in in units of land belonging to "one of the main ancient settlements in the region," identified by Gibson as having been in "Khirbet el-Burj (Titura), Bir Ma'in (Re'ut) and Berfilya." Archaeological remains of ancient human activities are designated 'features' and numbered accordingly. The landscape archaeology survey and excavations to date have idenitifed the following features: "farm buildings, towers, cisterns, sherd scatters, PPNA flint scatters, roads, terraces, stone boundaries, stone clearance heaps, threshing floors, caves, tombs, wine presses, cupmarks, stone quarries, lime kilns, and charcoal burners."

== Bibliography ==
- Barron, J. B., ed. (1923). Palestine: Report and General Abstracts of the Census of 1922. Government of Palestine.
- Benvenisti, E.; Gans, Chaim; Ḥanafī, S. (2007). Israel and the Palestinian refugees: Volume 189 of Beiträge zum ausländischen öffentlichen Recht und Völkerrecht (Illustrated ed.). Springer. ISBN 978-3-540-68160-1.
- Conder, C.R.; Kitchener, H.H. (1883). The Survey of Western Palestine: Memoirs of the Topography, Orography, Hydrography, and Archaeology. Vol. 3. London: Committee of the Palestine Exploration Fund.
- Department of Statistics (1945). Village Statistics, April, 1945. Government of Palestine.
- Eshed, Vered (2018-03-13). "Modiʽin, Barfiliya" (130). Hadashot Arkheologiyot – Excavations and Surveys in Israel.
- Gibson, S. (Spring 1999). "Landscape Archaeology and Salvage Excavations in Modi'in" (PDF). American Schools of Oriental Research Newsletter. 49 (1). Archived from the original (PDF) on 2016-03-03.
- Guérin, V. (1868). Description Géographique Historique et Archéologique de la Palestine (in French). Vol. 1: Judee, pt. 1. Paris: L'Imprimerie Nationale.
- Hadawi, S. (1970). Village Statistics of 1945: A Classification of Land and Area ownership in Palestine. Palestine Liberation Organization Research Center.
- Hartmann, M. (1883). "Die Ortschaftenliste des Liwa Jerusalem in dem türkischen Staatskalender für Syrien auf das Jahr 1288 der Flucht (1871)". Zeitschrift des Deutschen Palästina-Vereins. 6: 102–149.
- Herzog, C.; Gazit, S. (2004). The Arab-Israeli wars: war and peace in the Middle East from the War of Independence to the present (2nd, revised, illustrated ed.). Greenhill. ISBN 978-1-85367-585-0.
- Hütteroth, W.-D.; Abdulfattah, K. (1977). Historical Geography of Palestine, Transjordan and Southern Syria in the Late 16th Century. Erlanger Geographische Arbeiten, Sonderband 5. Erlangen, Germany: Vorstand der Fränkischen Geographischen Gesellschaft. ISBN 3-920405-41-2.
- Khalidi, W. (1992). All That Remains: The Palestinian Villages Occupied and Depopulated by Israel in 1948. Washington D.C.: Institute for Palestine Studies. ISBN 0-88728-224-5.
- Mills, E., ed. (1932). Census of Palestine 1931. Population of Villages, Towns and Administrative Areas. Jerusalem: Government of Palestine.
- Morris, B. (2004). The Birth of the Palestinian Refugee Problem Revisited. Cambridge University Press. ISBN 978-0-521-00967-6.
- Palestine Exploration Fund (1838). Henry C. Stewardson (ed.). The Survey of Western Palestine. Printed for the Committee of the Palestine Exploration Fund by Harrison & Sons.
- Palmer, E.H. (1881). The Survey of Western Palestine: Arabic and English Name Lists Collected During the Survey by Lieutenants Conder and Kitchener, R. E. Transliterated and Explained by E.H. Palmer. Committee of the Palestine Exploration Fund.
- Pringle, D. (1998). The Churches of the Crusader Kingdom of Jerusalem: L-Z (excluding Tyre). Vol. II. Cambridge University Press. ISBN 0-521-39037-0.
- Pringle, D. (1993). The Churches of the Crusader Kingdom of Jerusalem: A-K (excluding Acre and Jerusalem). Vol. I. Cambridge University Press. ISBN 0-521-39036-2.
- Proceedings of the Twenty-Second Congress of Orientalists. Brill Archive. 1957.
- Robinson, E.; Smith, E. (1841). Biblical Researches in Palestine, Mount Sinai and Arabia Petraea: A Journal of Travels in the year 1838. Vol. 3. Boston: Crocker & Brewster.
- Röhricht, R. (1893). (RRH) Regesta regni Hierosolymitani (MXCVII-MCCXCI) (in Latin). Berlin: Libraria Academica Wageriana.
- Sa'di, A.H.; Abu-Lughod, L. (2007). Nakba: Palestine, 1948, and the claims of memory (Illustrated ed.). Columbia University Press. ISBN 978-0-231-13579-5.
- Saunders, Trelawny; Conder; Kitchener; Palestine Exploration Fund (1881). An Introduction to the Survey of Western Palestine: Its Waterways, Plains, & Highlands. New Burlington Street: Richard Bentley and Son.
- Shapira, A.; Abel, Evelyn (2008). Yigal Allon, native son: a biography (Illustrated ed.). University of Pennsylvania Press. ISBN 978-0-8122-4028-3.
- Socin, A. (1879). "Alphabetisches Verzeichniss von Ortschaften des Paschalik Jerusalem". Zeitschrift des Deutschen Palästina-Vereins. 2: 135–163.
