= Operation Dani =

Israeli military offensive

- Part of the 1948 Arab–Israeli War
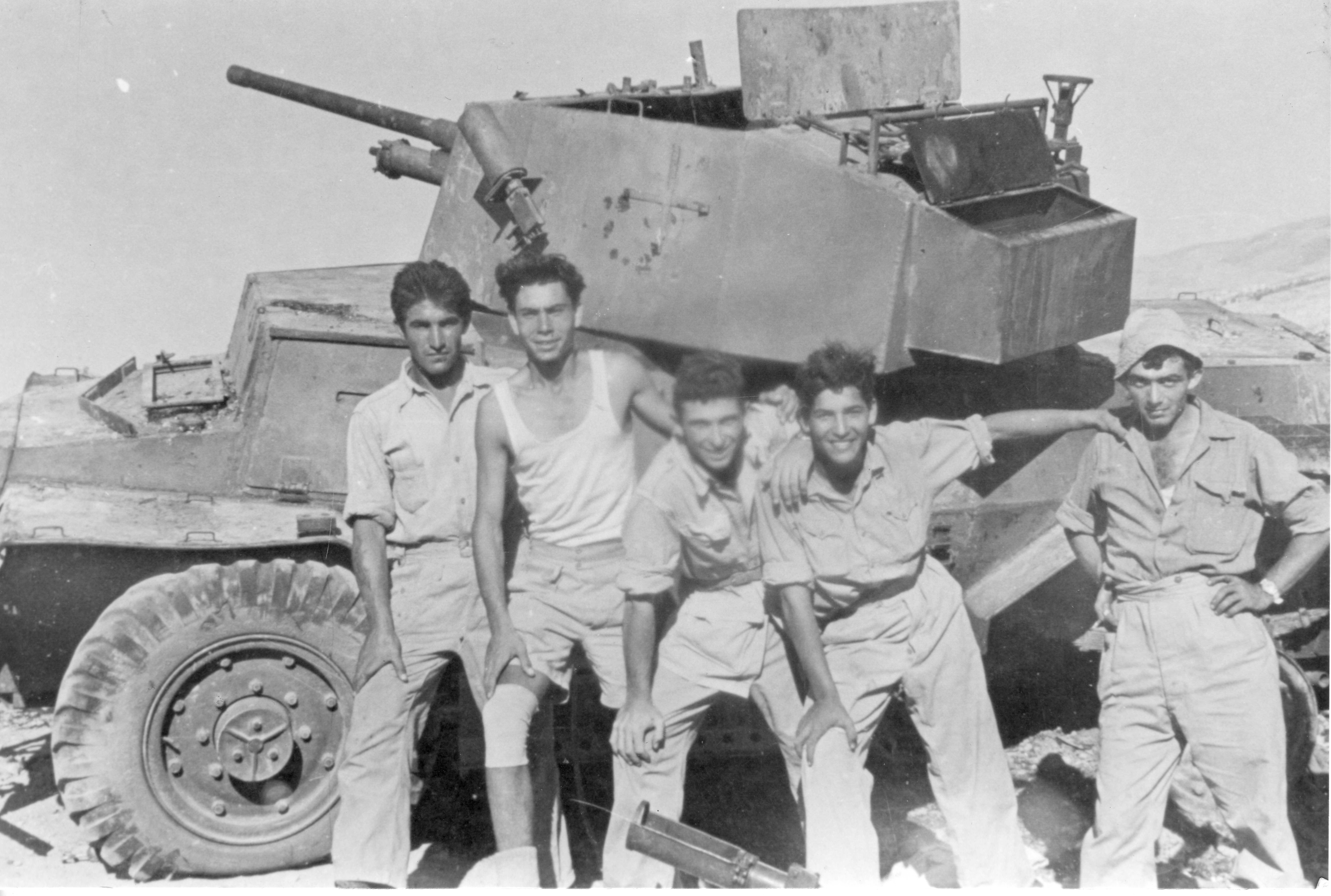
- Soldiers of the Yiftach Brigade with a captured Jordanian armored vehicle in the village of al-Burj, Ramle, 15 July 1948
| Date | July 9–19, 1948 |
| Location | East of Tel Aviv |
| Result | Capture of Ramle, Lydda and surrounding villages. Failure to capture Latrun |

Belligerents
| Israel (IDF) | (Jordan) Transjordan (Arab Legion) |

Commanders and leaders
| (Israel) Yigal Alon (Israel) Yitzhak Rabin | (Jordan) Glubb Pasha |

Strength
| 6,000 | |

Casualties and losses
| 91 killed | |

Operation Dani, (Note: Hebrew: מבצע דני, Mivtza Dani) also spelled Danny, was an Israeli military offensive launched on July 9–19, 1948 at the end of the first truce of the 1948 Arab–Israeli War. The objectives were to capture territory east of Tel Aviv and then to push inland and relieve the Jewish population and forces in Jerusalem. The main forces fighting against the IDF were the Arab Legion and Palestinian irregulars

On 10 July, Glubb Pasha ordered the defending Arab Legion troops to "make arrangements ... for a phony war".

The operation commander was Yigal Allon and his deputy was Yitzhak Rabin. The total force numbered around 6,000 soldiers.

== Name ==
The operation was named after Palmach officer Daniel "Dani" Mass, who had fallen on January 16, 1948, while commanding a relief action known as "Convoy of 35".

== Objectives ==
The first phase of Operation Dani was to capture the cities of Lydda and Ramle, located on the road to Jerusalem, southeast of Tel Aviv. Ramle was one of the main obstacles blocking Jewish transportation. From the start of the war, Lydda and Ramle militiamen had attacked Jewish traffic on nearby roads. Ramle became a focal point for blocking Jewish transportation, forcing traffic from Jerusalem to Tel Aviv to a southern bypass.

The second phase was to capture the fort at Latrun and break through Ramallah. The operation was carried out under Palmach command using the Yiftach Brigade, the Harel Brigade, the 8th Armored Brigade and two battalions from the Kiryati and Alexandroni brigades.

== Lydda and Ramle ==
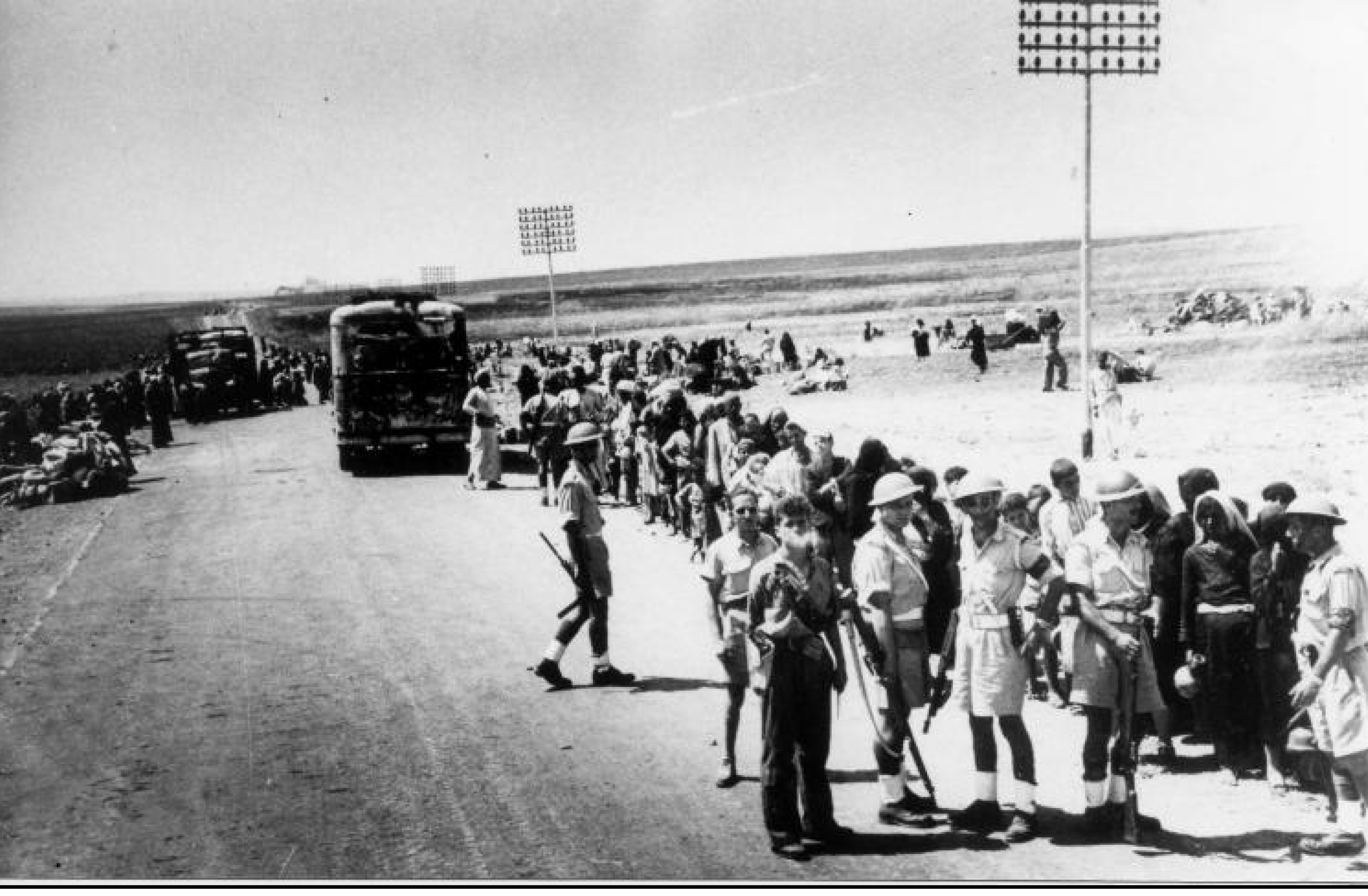
Palestinians expelled from Ramle in July 1948.

On 9 July units from the Yiftach Brigade began approaching Ramle from the south. At the same time troops from the other brigades began attacking villages north of Lydda. Caught in a pincer movement and with only a token Arab Legion presence the two towns were captured the following day. This put Lydda airport and the strategic railway station at Ramle in Israeli hands.

As part of the 1948 Palestinian expulsions, Israeli forces violently expelled 50,000-70,000 people from Lydda and Ramle, killing hundreds.

== Latrun ==
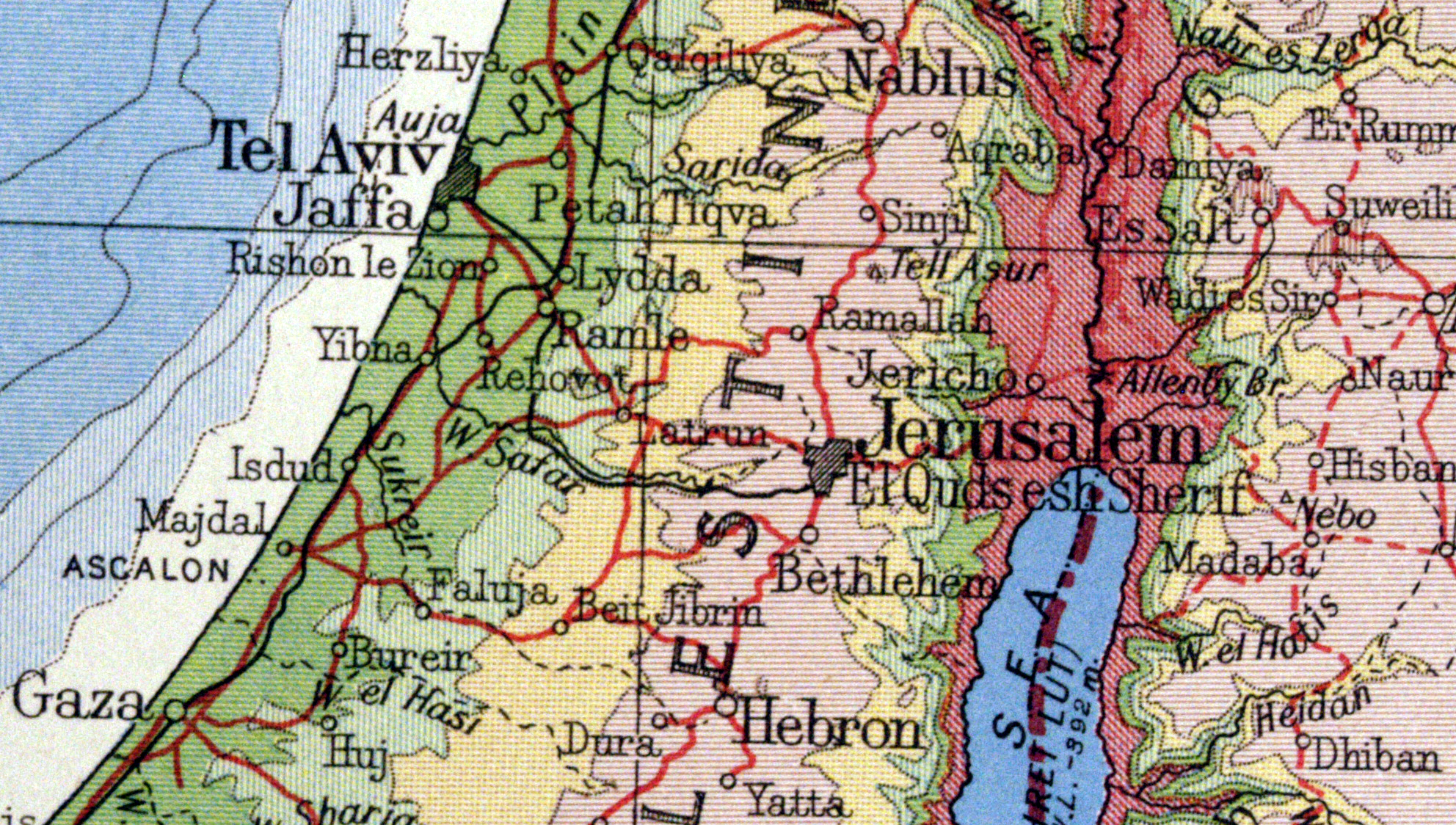
Road from Tel Aviv to Jerusalem.

The second phase of the operation failed after several costly attacks on Arab Legion positions in the Battle of Latrun and the threat of a UN-imposed cease-fire.

== Casualties ==
The Palmach record the names of ninety-one of its members killed during this Operation. Forty-four were killed at Khirbet Kurikur on 18 July 1948. Seven were killed in the capture of Lydda.

== Palestinian Arab communities captured ==
| Name | Date | Defending forces | Brigade | Population |
|---|---|---|---|---|
| Dayr Tarif | 9 July 1948 | Arab Legion | Armoured Brigade; Kiryati Brigade | 1,750 |
| Al-Tira | 10 July 1948 | n/a | Alexandroni Brigade; 8th Armoured Brigade | 1,290 |
| Daniyal | 10 July 1948 | n/a | Yiftach Brigade | 410 |
| Kharruba | 10 July 1948 | n/a | Yiftach Brigade | 170 |
| al-Barriyya | 9–10 July 1948 | n/a | n/a | 510 |
| 'Innaba | 10 July 1948 | 200 villagers | Yiftach Brigade; 8th Brigade | 1,420 |
| Jimzu | 10 July 1948 | n/a | Yiftach Brigade | 1,150 |
| Rantiya | 10 July 1948 | n/a | 8th Armoured Brigade; 3rd Battalion, Alexandroni Brigade | 590 |
| Lydda | 11 July 1948 | n/a | 3rd Battalion, Yiftah Brigade | see Ramle |
| Al-Jura | 11 July 1948 | n/a | n/a | 420 |
| Al-Muzayri'a | 12 July 1948 | n/a | n/a | 1,160 |
| Ramle | 12 July 1948 | Arab Legion withdrew | Kiryati Brigade | 50–70,000 combined with Lydda including 15,000 refugees from Jaffa |
| Majdal Yaba | 12 July 1948 | Iraqi army | 2nd Battalion, Alexandroni Brigade | 1,520 |
| Al-Haditha | 12 July 1948 | n/a | n/a | 760 |
| Abu al-Fadl | 12–13 July 1948 | n/a | n/a | 510 |
| Suba, Jerusalem | 12–13 July 1948 | "bloodless" | Har'el Brigade | 620 |
| Khirbat al-Lawz | 13–14 July 1948 | n/a | Har'el Brigade | 450 |
| Sar'a | 13–14 July 1948 | Egyptian forces | 4th Battalion Har'el Brigade | 340 |
| Sataf | 13–14 July 1948 | n/a | Har'el Brigade | 540 |
| al-Maliha | 14–16 July 1948 | Egyptian irregulars Palestinian militia | Irgun; Palmach Youth | 1,940 |
| al-Burj | 15 July 1948 | Arab Legion | n/a | 480 |
| Kh al-Buwayra | mid July 1948 | n/a | n/a | 190 |
| Salbit | 15–16 July 1948 | Arab Legion | 2nd Battalion, Kiryati Brigade | 510 |
| Bayt Nabala | 15–16 July 1948 | Arab Legion; 150-200 men | n/a | 2,310 |
| Bir Ma'in | 15–16 July 1948 | Arab Legion | Yiftach Brigade; 1st & 2nd Battalions | 510 |
| Barfiliya | 15–16 July 1948 | n/a | Givati and Kiryati Brigades; 8th Armoured | 730 |
| Kasla | 16 July 1948 | n/a | Har'el Brigade | 280 |
| Dayr 'Amr Boys Farm | 16 July 1948 | none | 4th Battalion Har'el Brigade | 10 |
| Ishwa' | 16 July 1948 | n/a | 4th Battalion Har'el Brigade | 620 |
| Artuf | 17–18 July 1948 | Palestinian militia under Egyptian command | 4th Battalion Har'el Brigade | 350 |
| Islin | 18 July 1948 | n/a | n/a | 260 |
| Shilta | 18 July 1948 | Arab Legion | 1st Battalion, Yiftach Brigade lost 44 men withdrawing | 100 |
Sources: Walid Khalidi, All That Remains, ISBN 0-88728-224-5; Benny Morris, The Birth of the Palestinian Refugee Problem, 1947–1949, ISBN 0-521-33028-9

== Units ==
- Overall Commander: Yigal Allon
- 8th Armored Brigade Commander Yitzhak Sadeh
- Alexandroni Brigade
- Kiryati Brigade (two battalions)
- Yiftach Brigade Commander Mula Cohen

== Gallery ==
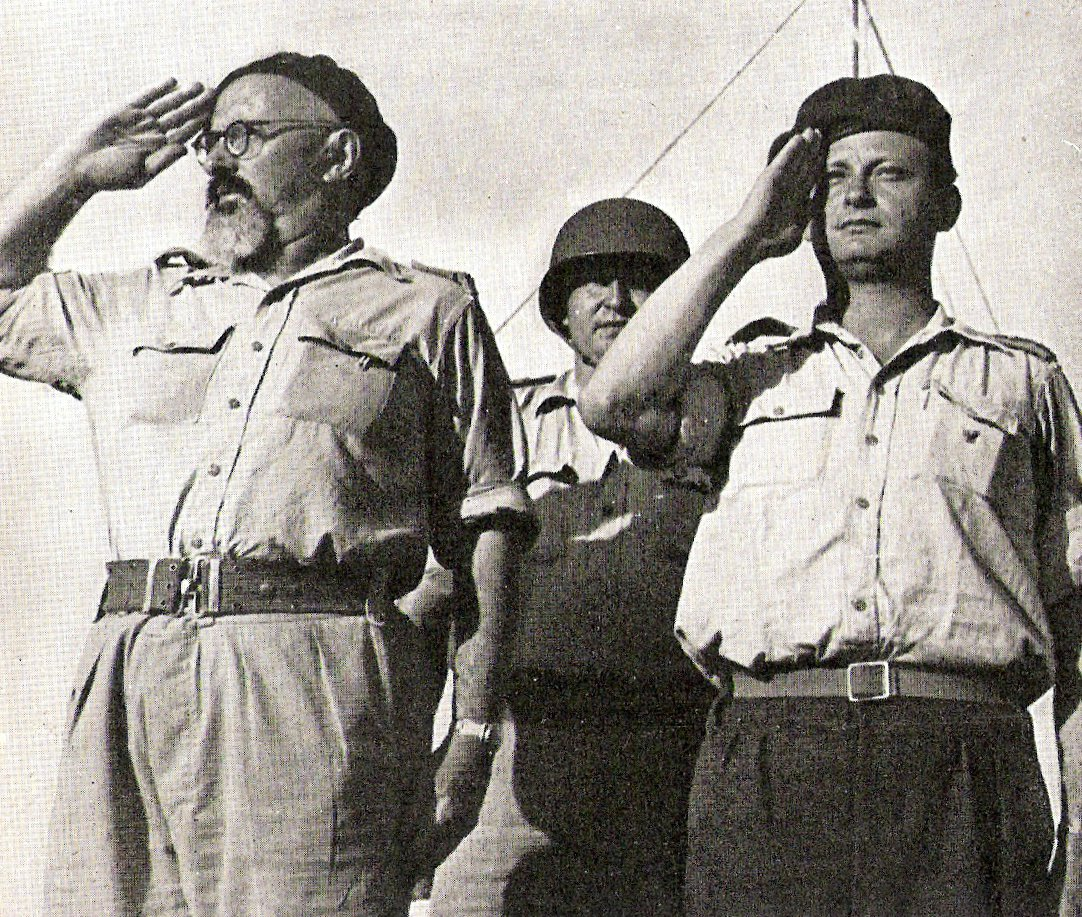
Yitzhak Sadeh (left) and Yigal Allon (1948)

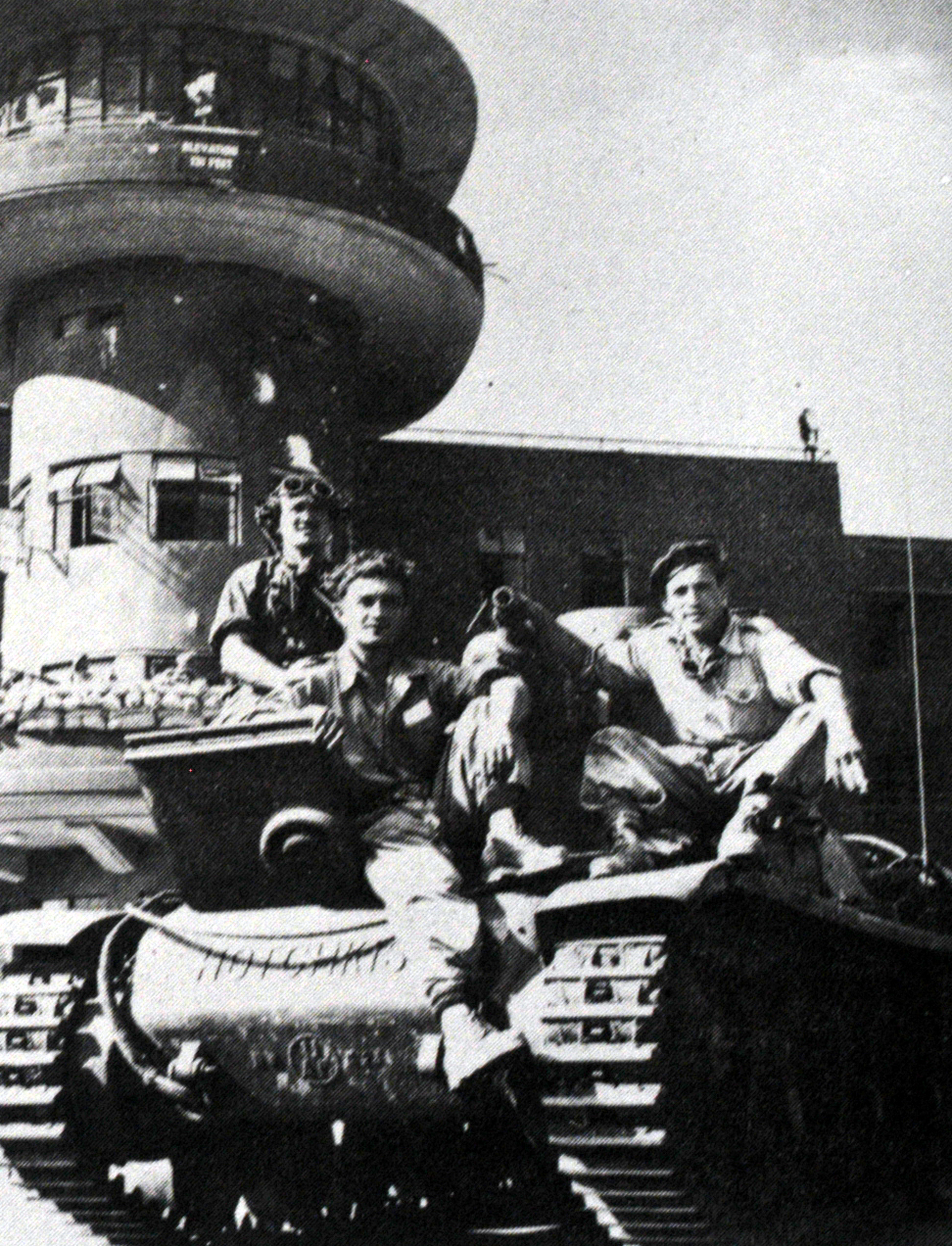
8th Armoured Brigade capture Lydda Airport (1948)

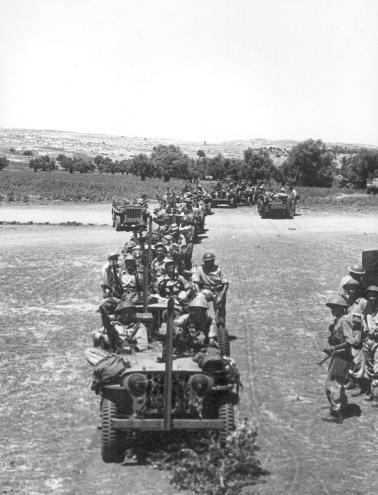
Yiftach Brigade before the attack on Lydda and Ramle, 1948

== See also ==
- Operation Ha-Har
- List of battles and operations in the 1948 Palestine war
- Depopulated Palestinian locations in Israel
