= Gideon Eilat =

Israeli military commander

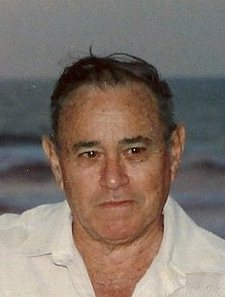
- Eliat in 1998
- Born: 17 January 1924; Königsberg, East Prussia, Weimar Germany
- Died: 21 April 2015 (aged 91) Afula, Israel
- Allegiance: Palmach

Gideon (Gidi) Eilat (1924–2015) was a member of the Palmach, the commander of the third battalion of the Yiftach Brigade during the 1947–1949 Palestine war. He was active in the Kibbutz Artzi movement, one of the founders of the Civil Guard of the Israel Police, and a member of Kibbutz Beit Alfa.

He was born in 1924 in the city of Königsberg in East Prussia (later Kaliningrad) and emigrated to Mandatory Palestine with his family in 1933.

In 1942 he enlisted in the Palmach and served as a member of the 5th company stationed in Kibbutz Na’an. He became squad leader of the 5th company in Givat Haim.

In 1946 he was arrested by the British during Operation Agatha.

Eilat was the commander of the 4th company in the 72nd battalion of the 7th brigade. He led the company in the bloody Battle of Latrun.

Eilat was married to Ruti and had four children.
