= Bir Ma'in =

Bir Ma'in بئر ماعين
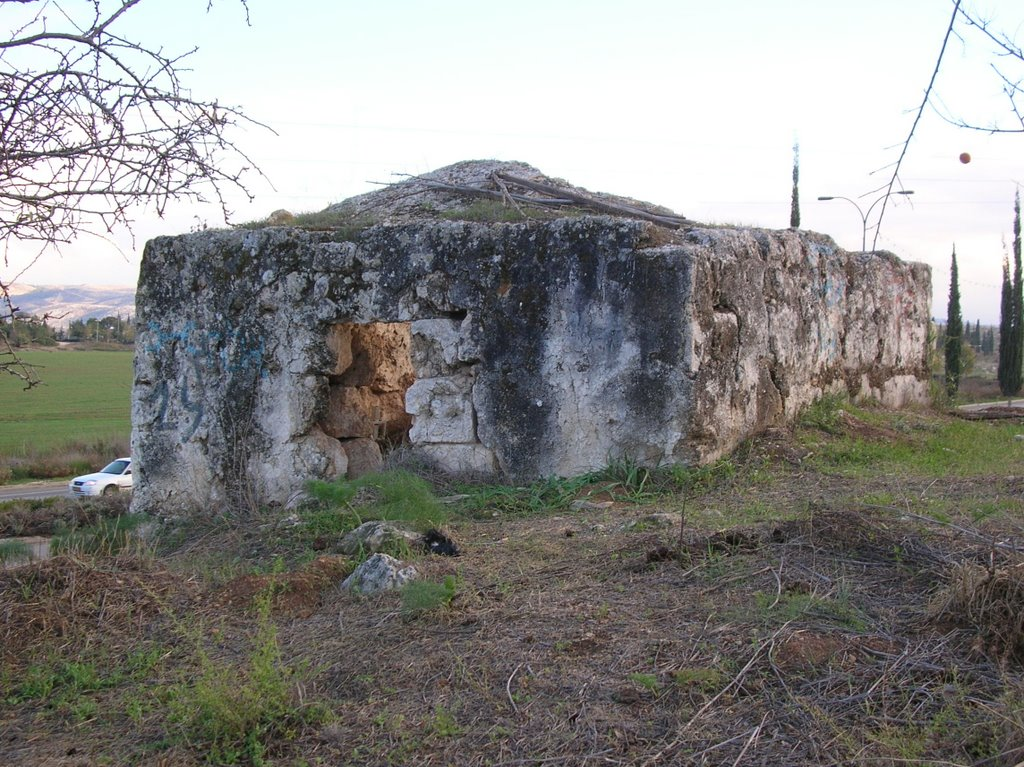
- Sitt Manna', one of five sisters, whose maqam is just northeast of the centre of Bir Ma'in
- Etymology: The well of springs
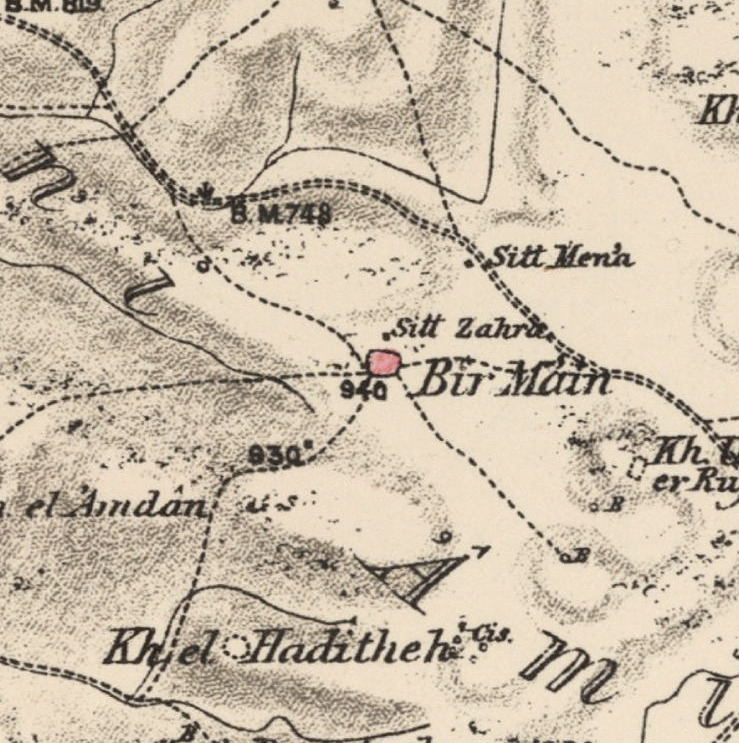
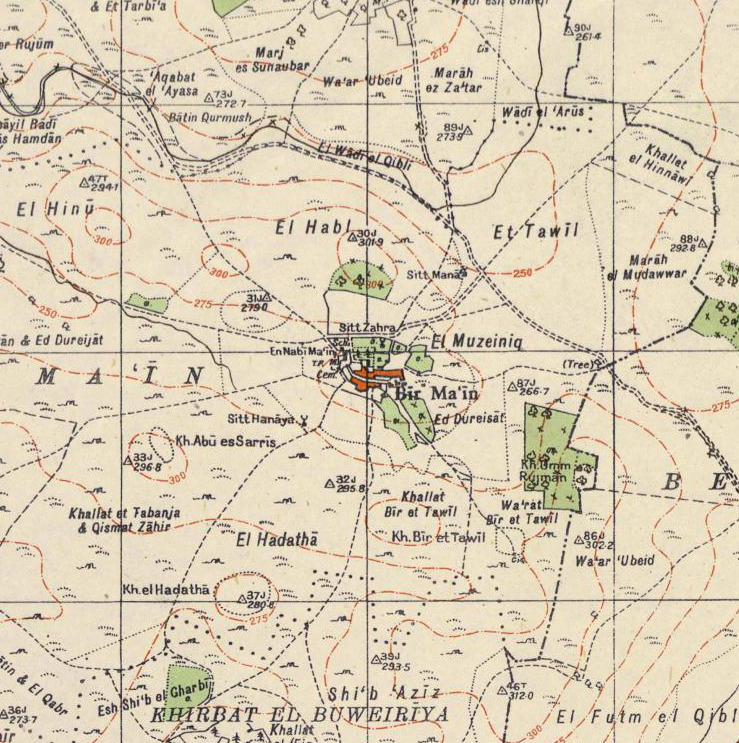
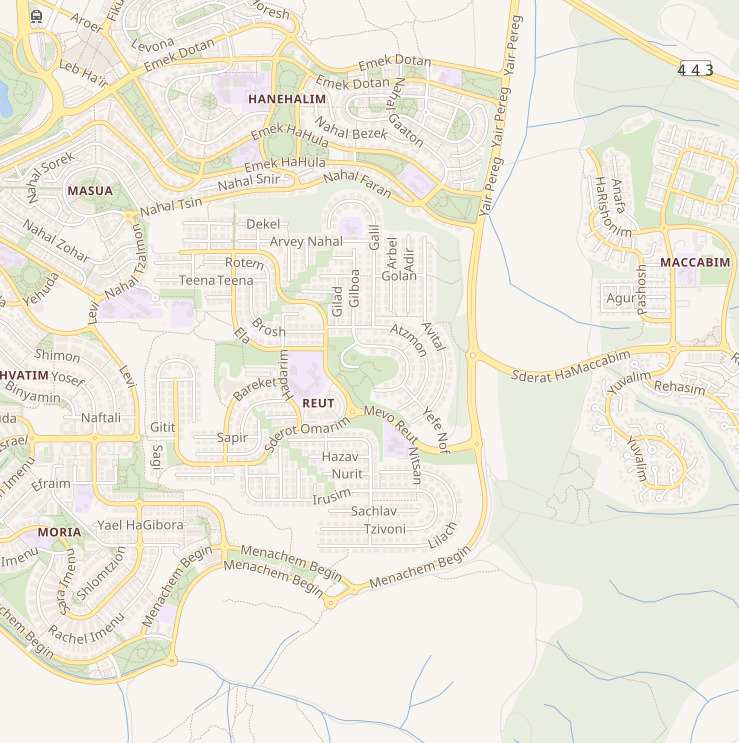
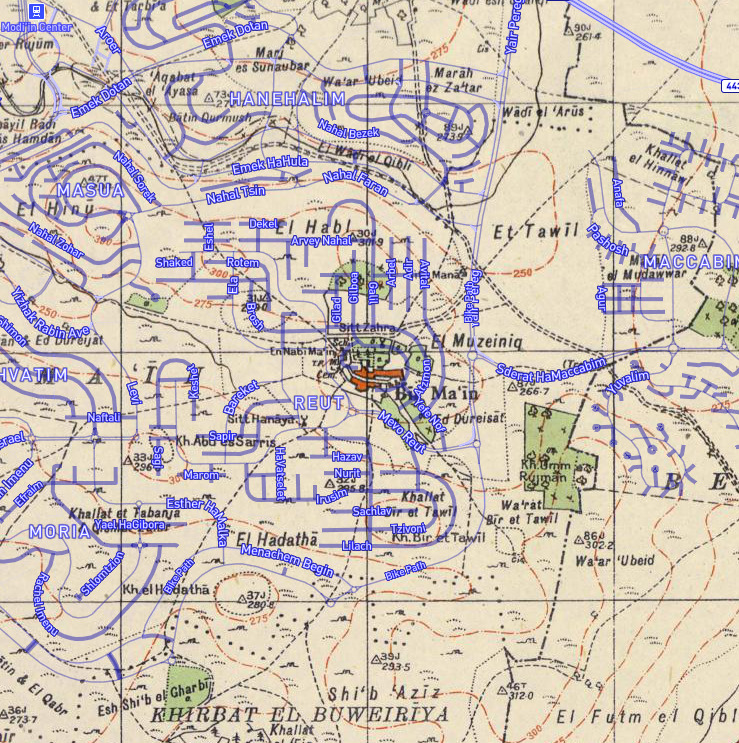
- 1870s map 1940s map modern map 1940s with modern overlay map A series of historical maps of the area around Bir Ma'in (click the buttons)

- Location within Mandatory Palestine
- Coordinates: 31°53′17″N 35°01′12″E
- Palestine grid: 152/143
- Geopolitical entity: Mandatory Palestine
- Subdistrict: Ramle
- Date of depopulation: July 15–16, 1948

Population (1945)
  - Total: 510
- Cause(s) of depopulation: Military assault by Yishuv forces
- Current Localities: Makkabim

Bir Ma'in, or Bir Imma'in (Arabic: بير اماعين/ماعين), was a Palestinian Arab village in the Ramle Subdistrict. It was depopulated during the 1948 Arab-Israeli War on July 15, 1948 during the second phase of Operation Danny by the First and Second Battalions of the Yiftach Brigade. It was located 14 km east of Ramla. The village was defended by the Jordanian Army.

== Etymology ==
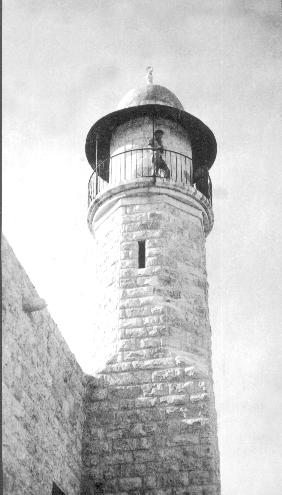
Member of Yiftach Brigade watches an attack on Latrun during Operation Danny from the mosque in Bir Ma'in. July 1948

Bi’r Māʽīn meaning "The well of Maʽīn" in Arabic. The personal name Ma'in is recorded in the toponymy of southern Judea and southern Philistia, and locally considered the name of one of Jacob’s sons. The crusaders recorded the name as. Bermenayn.

== Foundation legend ==
In 1873, Clermont-Ganneau noted down the foundation legend of Bir Ma'in. He was told that the village mosque was consecrated to its founder, Neby Ma'in, son of Jacob (which may be identical to Benjamin). He was buried in a cave nearby. When he died, his five sisters hurried to Bir Ma'in from Jiser Benat Ya'kub ('Jacob Daughters' Bridge'). However, they all died at different places in the neighbourhood, and were buried where they died. Their tombs were still an object of veneration, Sitt Mena being one of them.

== History ==
=== Crusader period ===
Bir Ma'in was a fief of the Holy Sepulchre Church in the twelfth century. In 1170, Bernhard, Bishop of Lydda, granted the leaders of the Holy Sepulchre Church the right to build churches in five villages, including Bir Ma'in. It is unclear if a church was ever built.

At the time of the Crusades there was a fort here, which was destroyed by Saladin, and rebuilt by Richard Lionheart.

=== Ottoman period ===
Bir Ma'in was incorporated into the Ottoman Empire in 1517 with all of Palestine.

In 1552, Bir Ma'in was an inhabited village. Haseki Hürrem Sultan, the favourite wife of Suleiman the Magnificent, endowed the tax revenues of Bir Ma'in to its Haseki Sultan Imaret in Jerusalem. Administratively, the village belonged to the Sub-district of Ramla in the District of Gaza.

In 1596 Bir Ma'in appeared in the tax registers being in the nahiya ("subdistrict") of Ramla, which was under the administration of the Gaza Sanjak. It had a population of 30 household; an estimated 165 persons, who were all Muslims. They paid a fixed tax-rate of 25 % on wheat, barley, summer crops, olive trees, sesame, goats and beehives, in addition to occasional revenues and a press for olive oil or grape syrup; a total of 3,500 akçe. All of the revenues went to a Waqf.

In 1838, Bir Am'in was noted as a Muslim village in the Lydda District.

In 1863 Victor Guérin described it as a village of a hundred or more inhabitants, located on a hill. He noted that ancient stones, lying on the ground, proved that this hamlet once had a certain importance.

An Ottoman village list of about 1870 showed that Bir Main had 12 houses and a population of 90, though the population count included men, only.

In 1873, Clermont-Ganneau noted down the legend connecting the village to the son and daughters of Yakub, the Muslim version of biblical Jacob (see #Foundation legend section).

In 1883, the PEF's Survey of Western Palestine described Bir Main as "A small hamlet on high ground, with a well about half a mile south-east."

During this period, former Bedouins from 'Arab al-Jaramina tribe settled in the village and in neighbouring al-Burj.

=== British Mandate ===
In the 1922 census of Palestine conducted by the British Mandate authorities, Bir Ma'in had a population of 289 inhabitants; all Muslims, increasing in the 1931 census when Bir Imma'in had 355 Muslim inhabitants, in a total of 85 houses.

In 1934, an elementary school was founded in the village.

In 1944/45 statistics the village had a population of 510 Muslims, while the total land area was 9,319 dunams, according to an official land and population survey. Of this, 176 dunums of village land were irrigated or used for plantations, 2,880 dunums were for cereals, while 9 dunams were classified as built-up areas.

The village also had its own mosque. Three khirbats are located in the village.

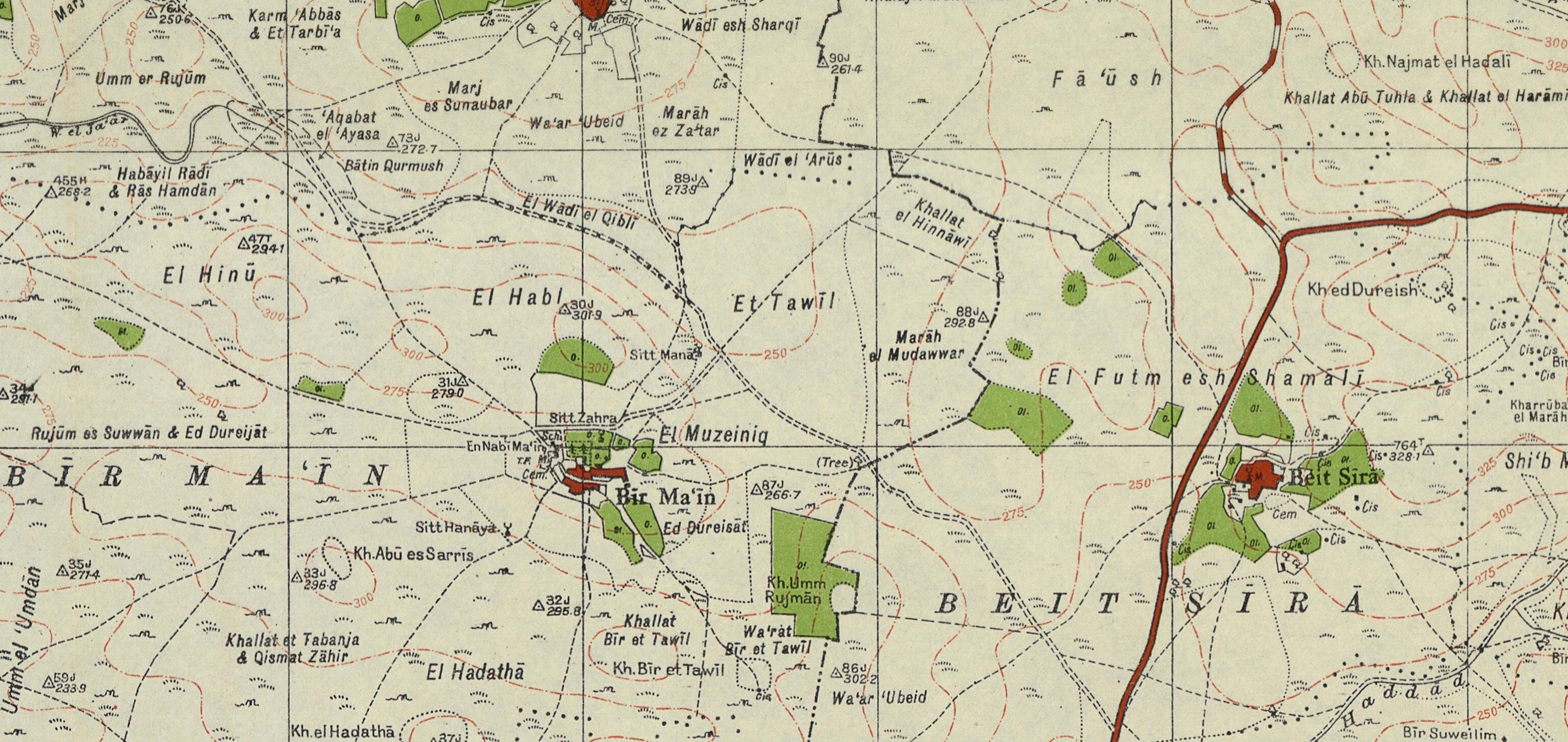
Bir Ma'in 1944 1:20,000 from 1919 survey

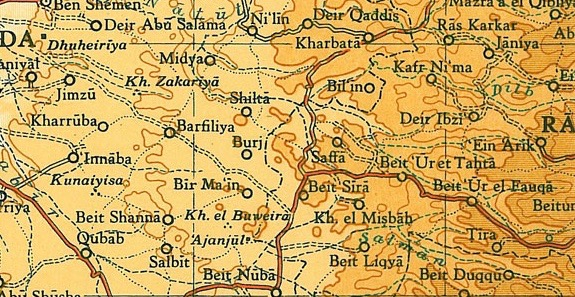
Bir Ma'in 1945 1:250,000

=== 1948, aftermath ===
Bir Ma'in became depopulated during the 1948 Arab-Israeli War on July 15, 1948 during the second phase of Operation Danny by the First and Second Battalions of the Yiftach Brigade.

The Israeli military settlement of Makkabim was established on village land in 1986.

In 1992 the remains were described: "Two deserted buildings with crumbling walls can be seen on the site ... Part of the surrounding land is used for target practice and other Israeli military purposes, and part of it is cultivated by Israeli farmers."

In 2002, a book about the village was published in Jordan.

== See also ==
- Daughters of Jacob Bridge on the Jordan, associated with biblical Jacob due to a misunderstanding
- Jacob's Well, site associated with biblical Jacob in Samaritan and Christian tradition
- Jubb Yussef (Joseph's Well), site associated with biblical Joseph in Muslim tradition

== Bibliography ==
- Barron, J.B., ed. (1923). Palestine: Report and General Abstracts of the Census of 1922. Government of Palestine.
- Clermont-Ganneau, C.S. (1896). [ARP] Archaeological Researches in Palestine 1873-1874, translated from the French by J. McFarlane. Vol. 2. London: Palestine Exploration Fund.
- Conder, C.R.; Kitchener, H.H. (1883). The Survey of Western Palestine: Memoirs of the Topography, Orography, Hydrography, and Archaeology. Vol. 3. London: Committee of the Palestine Exploration Fund.
- Davis, Rochelle (2011). Palestinian Village Histories: Geographies of the Displaced. Stanford: Stanford University Press. ISBN 978-0-8047-7313-3.
- Government of Palestine, Department of Statistics (1945). Village Statistics, April, 1945.
- Guérin, V. (1868). Description Géographique Historique et Archéologique de la Palestine (in French). Vol. 1: Judee, pt. 1. Paris: L'Imprimerie Nationale.
- Hadawi, S. (1970). Village Statistics of 1945: A Classification of Land and Area ownership in Palestine. Palestine Liberation Organization Research Center.
- Hartmann, M. (1883). "Die Ortschaftenliste des Liwa Jerusalem in dem türkischen Staatskalender für Syrien auf das Jahr 1288 der Flucht (1871)". Zeitschrift des Deutschen Palästina-Vereins. 6: 102–149.
- Hütteroth, W.-D.; Abdulfattah, K. (1977). Historical Geography of Palestine, Transjordan and Southern Syria in the Late 16th Century. Erlanger Geographische Arbeiten, Sonderband 5. Erlangen, Germany: Vorstand der Fränkischen Geographischen Gesellschaft. ISBN 3-920405-41-2.
- Khadar, Shafiq 'Eid. 2002. Qaryat Bir Ma'in: Al-Hilm wal-haqiqa [Bir Ma'in village: The dream and the reality]. Jordan:
- Khalidi, W. (1992). All That Remains:The Palestinian Villages Occupied and Depopulated by Israel in 1948. Washington D.C.: Institute for Palestine Studies. ISBN 0-88728-224-5.
- Mills, E., ed. (1932). Census of Palestine 1931. Population of Villages, Towns and Administrative Areas. Jerusalem: Government of Palestine.
- Morris, B. (2004). The Birth of the Palestinian Refugee Problem Revisited. Cambridge University Press. ISBN 978-0-521-00967-6.
- Palmer, E.H. (1881). The Survey of Western Palestine: Arabic and English Name Lists Collected During the Survey by Lieutenants Conder and Kitchener, R. E. Transliterated and Explained by E.H. Palmer. Committee of the Palestine Exploration Fund.
- Pringle, D. (1993). The Churches of the Crusader Kingdom of Jerusalem: A-K (excluding Acre and Jerusalem). Vol. I. Cambridge University Press. ISBN 0-521-39036-2.
- Robinson, E.; Smith, E. (1841). Biblical Researches in Palestine, Mount Sinai and Arabia Petraea: A Journal of Travels in the year 1838. Vol. 3. Boston: Crocker & Brewster.
- Röhricht, R. (1893). (RRH) Regesta regni Hierosolymitani (MXCVII-MCCXCI) (in Latin). Berlin: Libraria Academica Wageriana.
- de Roziére, ed. (1849). Cartulaire de l'église du Saint Sépulchre de Jérusalem: publié d'après les manuscrits du Vatican (in Latin and French). Paris: Imprimerie nationale.
- Socin, A. (1879). "Alphabetisches Verzeichniss von Ortschaften des Paschalik Jerusalem". Zeitschrift des Deutschen Palästina-Vereins. 2: 135–163.
