= Khirbat al-Buwayra =

Khirbat al-Buwayra خربة البويرة
- Village
- Etymology: the little pit
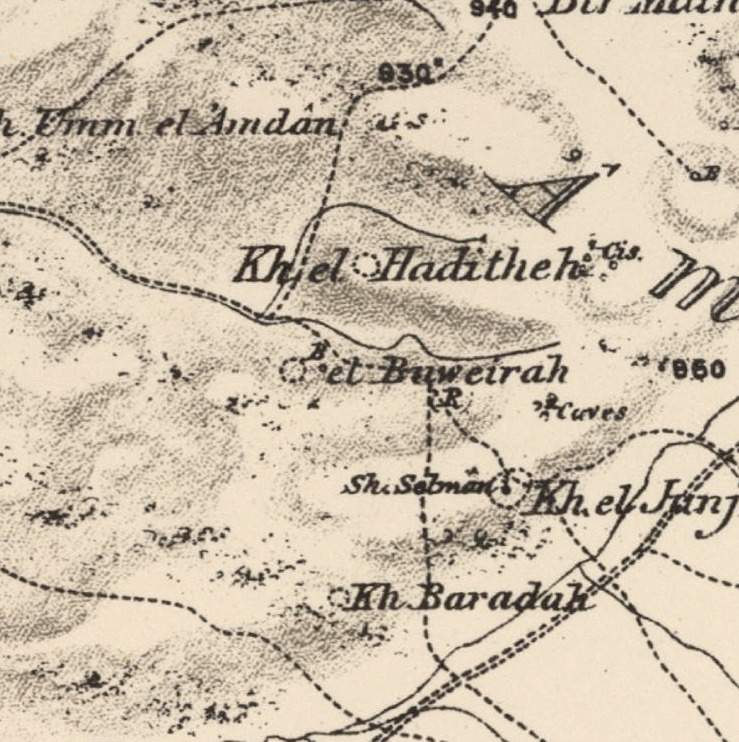
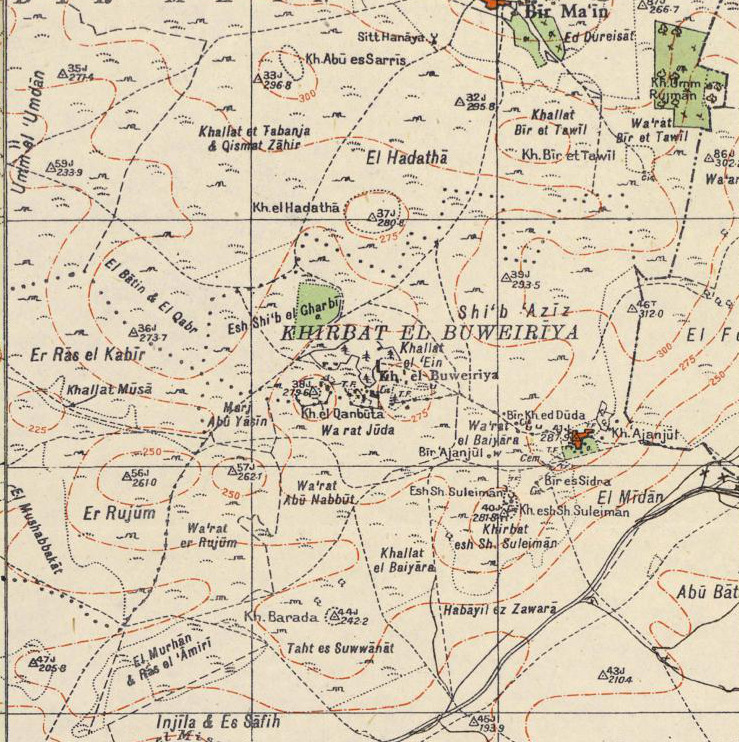
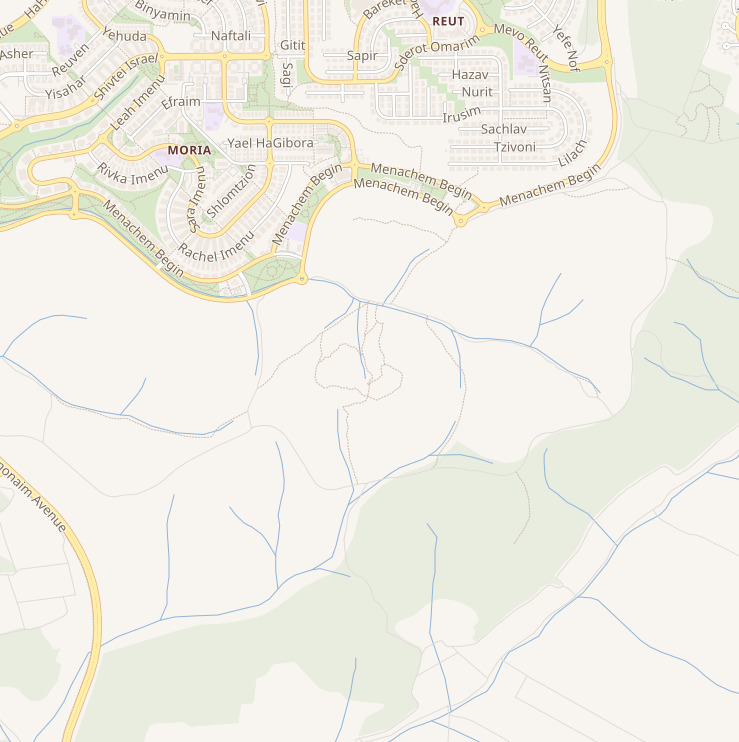
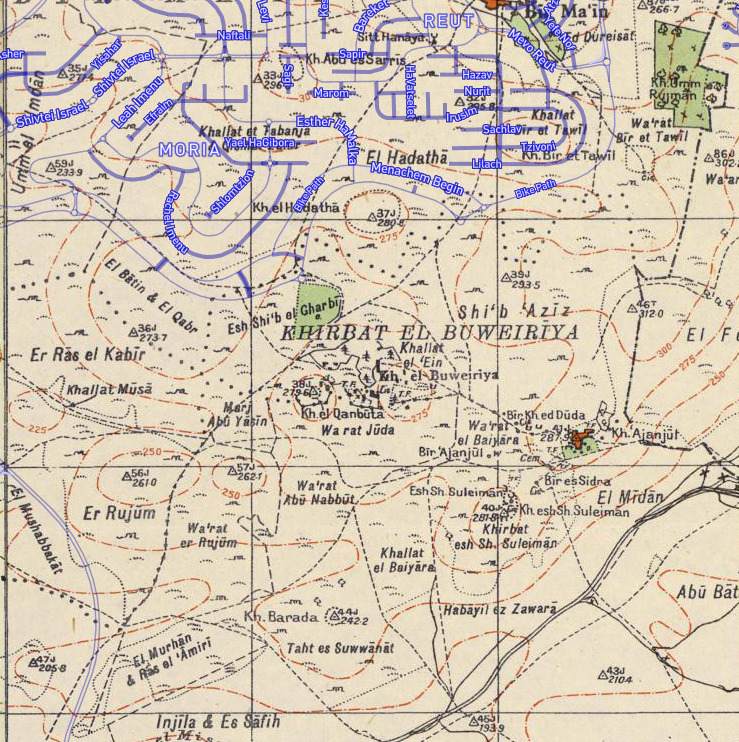
- 1870s map 1940s map modern map 1940s with modern overlay map A series of historical maps of the area around Khirbat al-Buwayra (click the buttons)

- Location within Mandatory Palestine
- Coordinates: 31°52′27″N 35°00′52″E
- Palestine grid: 151/142
- Geopolitical entity: Mandatory Palestine
- Subdistrict: Ramle
- Date of depopulation: July 15, 1948

Population (1945)
  - Total: 190

Khirbat al-Buwayra was a Palestinian Arab village in the Ramle Subdistrict. It was depopulated during the 1948 Arab-Israeli War on July 15, 1948, under the second phase of Operation Dani. It was located 15 km southeast of Ramla.

== History ==
By the beginning of the 20th century, residents from Qatanna settled Khirbat al-Buwayra, establishing it as a dependency – or satellite village – of their home village.

In the 1931 census El Buweiyiri had 101 Muslim inhabitants, in a total of 17 houses.

In the 1945 statistics, it had a population of 190 Muslims and 1,150 dunums of land. Of this, 31 dunums were irrigated or used for orchards, 316 dunums were used for cereals, while 803 dunams were classified as non-cultivable areas.

The center of the village contained many wells and the village has a khirba with the foundation of a building with cisterns. Today the village area is used as a military training ground by the Israeli Army.

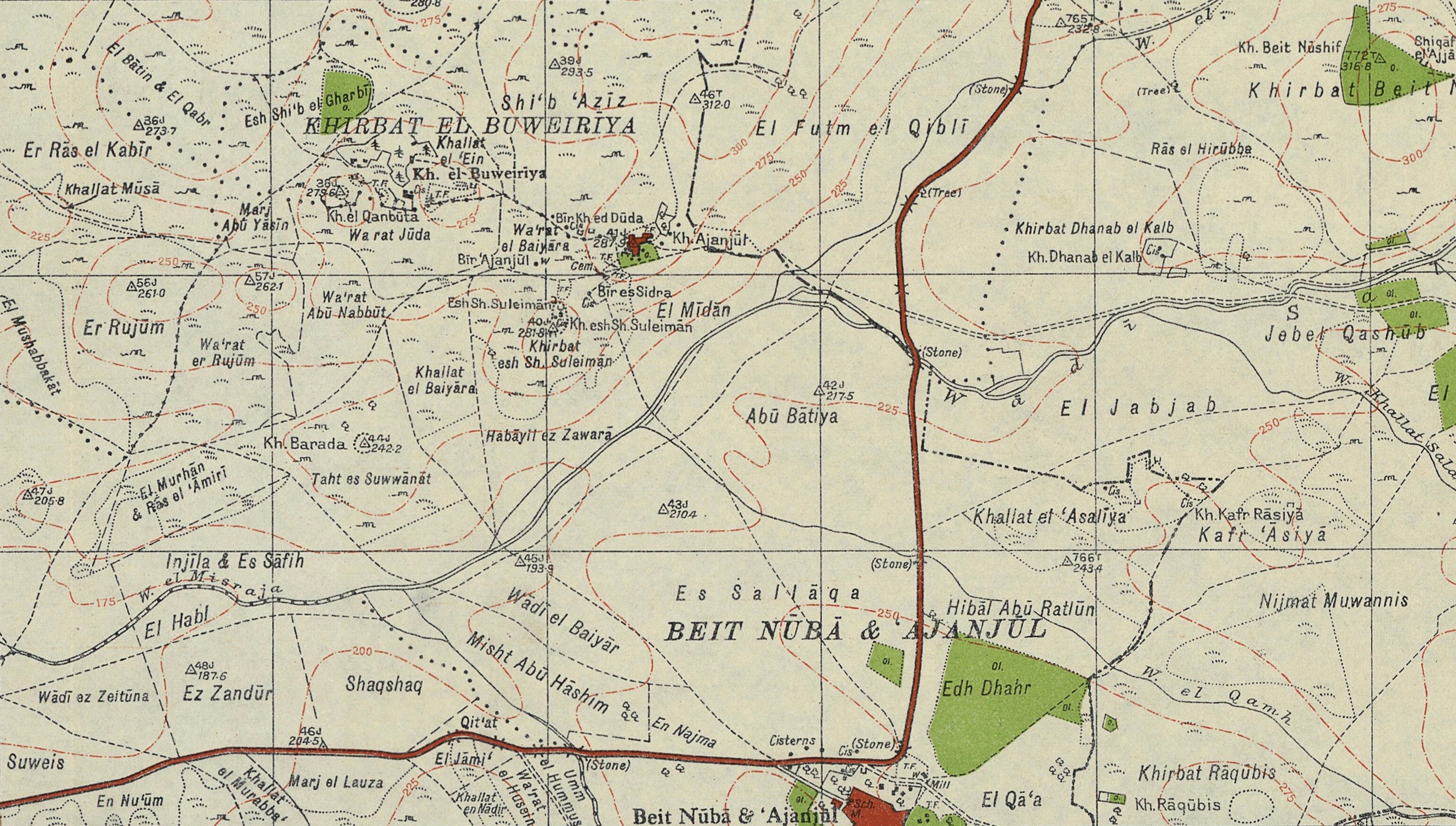
Khirbat al-Buwayra from 1919 survey 1:20,000.

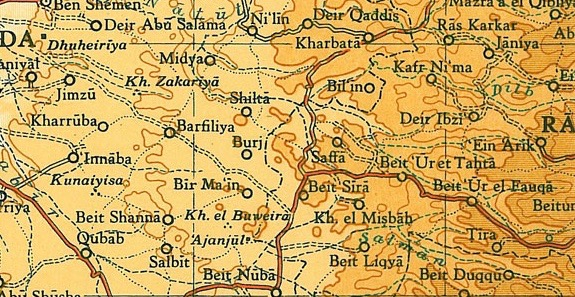
Khirbat al-Buwayra 1945 1:250,000 (bottom left quadrant)

== Bibliography ==
- Government of Palestine, Department of Statistics (1945). Village Statistics, April, 1945.
- Hadawi, S. (1970). Village Statistics of 1945: A Classification of Land and Area ownership in Palestine. Palestine Liberation Organization Research Center. Archived from the original on 2018-12-08.
- Khalidi, W. (1992). All That Remains: The Palestinian Villages Occupied and Depopulated by Israel in 1948. Washington D.C.: Institute for Palestine Studies. ISBN 0-88728-224-5.
- Mills, E., ed. (1932). Census of Palestine 1931. Population of Villages, Towns and Administrative Areas. Jerusalem: Government of Palestine.
- Morris, B. (2004). The Birth of the Palestinian Refugee Problem Revisited. Cambridge University Press. ISBN 978-0-521-00967-6.
