= Yiftach Brigade =

Unit of the Israel Defense Forces

11th Brigade "Yiftach"
- חֲטִיבַת יִפְתָּח
- Emblem of the Yiftach Brigade
- Country: Israel
- Allegiance: Israel Defense Forces
- Branch: Israeli Ground Forces
- Type: Reserve
- Part of: 99th Division
- Engagements: Israeli Independence War; Sinai War; Six Day War; Yom Kippur War; Operation Defensive Shield; Gaza war

The 11th Brigade (also known as the Yiftach Brigade; Hebrew: חֲטִיבַת יִפְתָּח) is a reserve formation of the Israel Defense Forces, composed mainly of fighters that completed their compulsory service in the Unit 621 – 'Egoz'. The brigade is assigned to the 99th Infantry Division.

== History ==
In the 1948 Arab–Israeli War it was a Palmach infantry brigade. It was formed in late April 1948 from existing Palmach battalions: the First Battalion, that resided in Jezreel Valley and the Third Battalion in the eastern valleys. In late 1948, the Second Palmach Battalion was transferred to it from the Negev Brigade.

The Palmach memorial website records 274 of its members being killed whilst in the Yiftach Brigade.

In May 1949 the Palmach brigade was disbanded. This was part of a general downsizing of the IDF (9 out of 12 brigades were disbanded). It was also considered by many as part of Ben-Gurion's process of disbanding the Palmach itself.

A while after that, it was re-established as a reserve unit that served in the Gaza Strip front As an infantry brigade it also fought in the Suez Crisis and in the Six-Day War in the Gaza Strip

In 1971 the brigade was converted to an armored brigade. It fought in the Egyptian front of the Yom Kippur War in 1973. After the war it was regrouped and its unit number was changed to 576. in 2006 the brigade fought in Operation Defensive Shield.

In May 2014 it was disbanded.

=== Reestablishment ===
In 2016, the decision was made to reestablish the brigade as a reserves elite infantry force by transferring battalions from the 810th “Hermon” Brigade that was disbanded as part of the multi-year Gideon Plan. Nearly all of the soldiers in the brigade served as operators in the elite Egoz unit. In September 2020, the brigade transferred command to the 99th Infantry Division, where it serves as a commando reserves force.

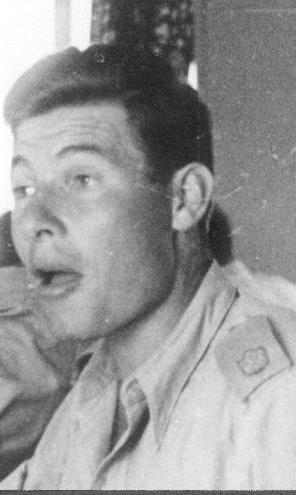
Moshe Kelman, commander during Operation Yiftach

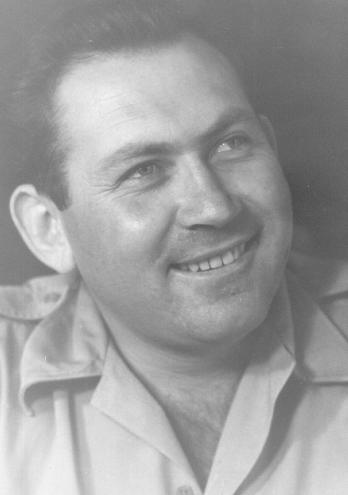
Mula Cohen, commander during Operation Danny

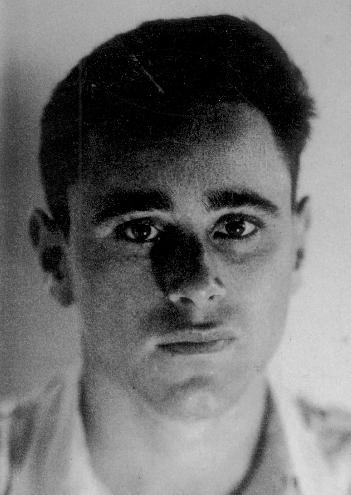
Gideon Eilat commander during Operation Yoav

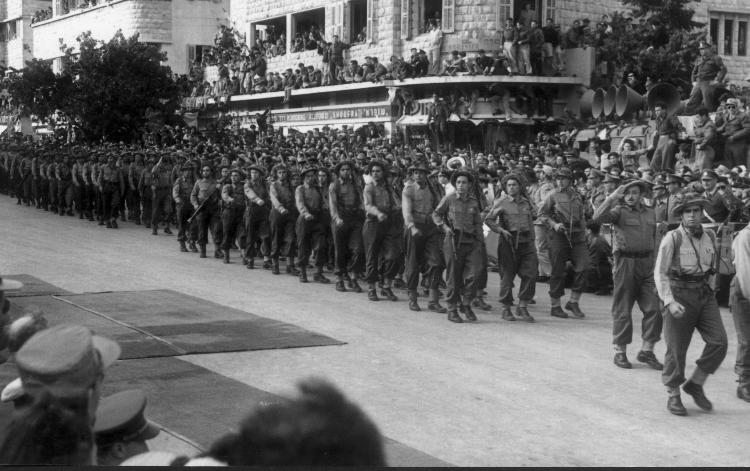
Yiftach Brigade parading in Haifa. April 1949

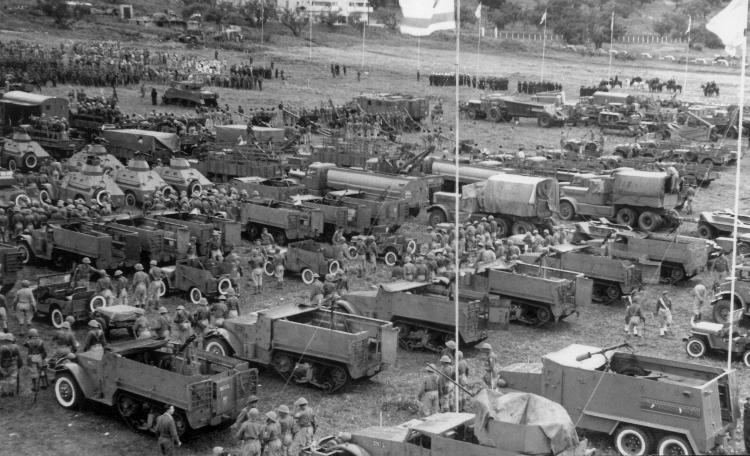
Yiftach Brigade Second Battalion on parade marking first anniversary of the 1948 Arab-Israeli war, Haifa

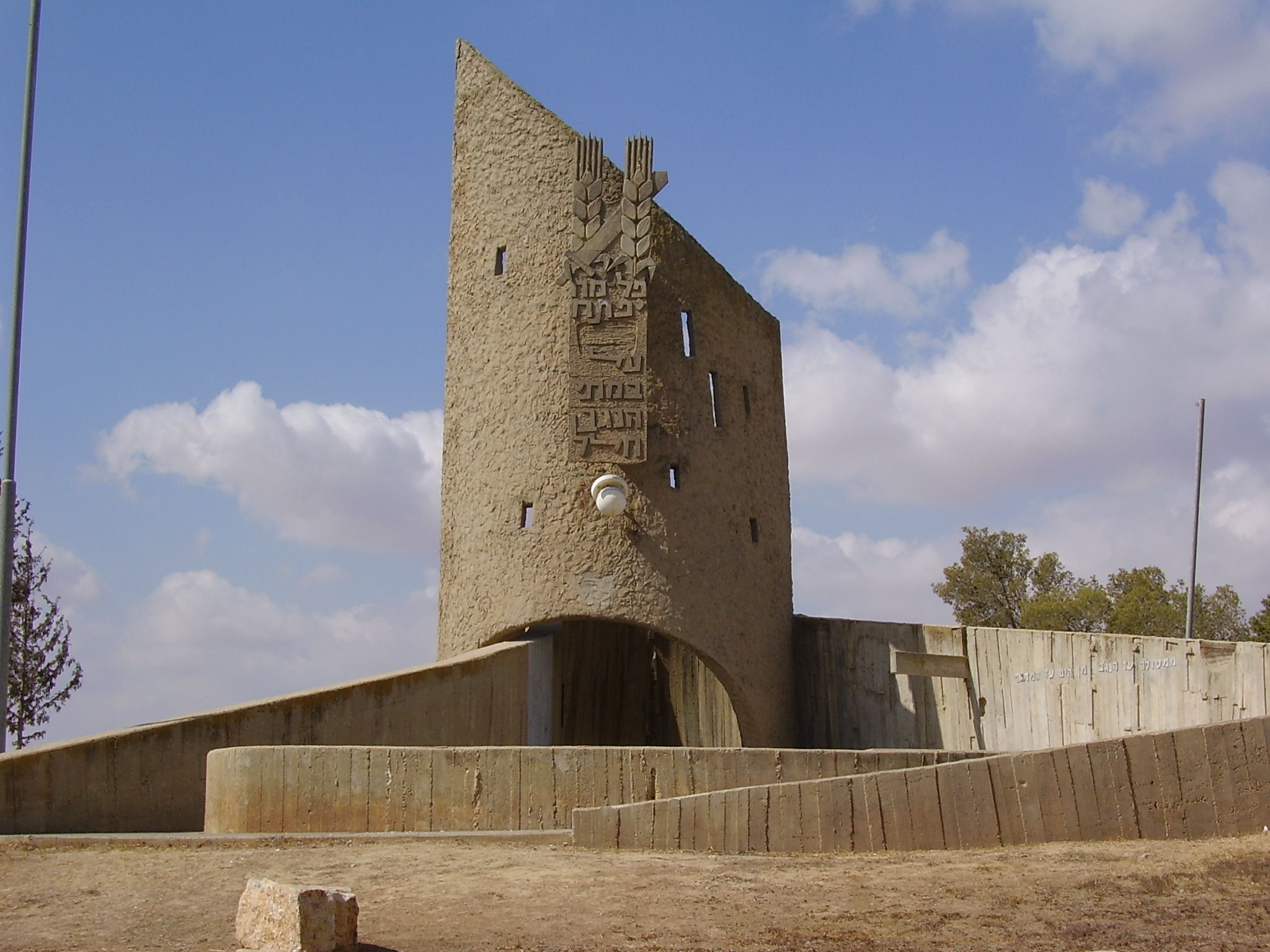
Yiftach Brigade Memorial near Beit Kama

== Organization ==
- 11th Infantry Brigade "Yiftach"
  - 5037th Infantry Battalion
  - 7220th Infantry Battalion
  - 8226th Infantry Battalion
  - (7810th) Reconnaissance Battalion
  - 5011th Logistics Battalion
  - Signals Company

== Military operations ==
The Yiftach Brigade participated in the following Israeli military operations:

- Operation Yiftach
- Operation Yoram
- Operation Danny
- Operation Yoav
- Metzudat Koach

== Memorial ==
The memorial for the fallen soldiers of the Yiftach Brigade is situated in the northern Negev north of Rahat, near Kibbutz Beit Kama and Kama Junction on Road 40.

== See also ==
- List of battles and operations in the 1948 Palestine war
