= Yehia =

Yehia is a masculine given name and surname of Arabic origin. Notable people with the name include:

== Given name ==
- Yehia Chahine (1917–1994), Egyptian film producer and an actor of film and theater
- Yehia El-Deraa (born 1995), Egyptian handball player
- Yehia Dessouki (born 1978), Egyptian painter and visual artist
- Yehia Bahei El-Din, Egyptian academic
- Yehia Emam (1919–1997), Egyptian footballer
- Yehia El-Fakharany (born 1945), Egyptian actor
- Yehia Galal, Egyptian judge
- Yehia El-Gamal (1930–2016), Egyptian lawyer and politician
- Yehia El-Gamal (pediatrician) (died 2021), Egyptian pediatrician
- Yehia Hachem (born 1981), Lebanese footballer
- Yahya Haqqi (1905–1992), Egyptian writer and novelist
- Yehia Nabil Khaled (born 1971), Egyptian footballer
- Yehia El-Mashad (1932–1980), Egyptian atomic scientist
- Yehia Massoud, American engineer

== Surname ==
- Tarek Yehia (born 1961), Egyptian football player
