= Dov Gazit =

Israeli Air Force commander (1908–1986)

- דב גזית
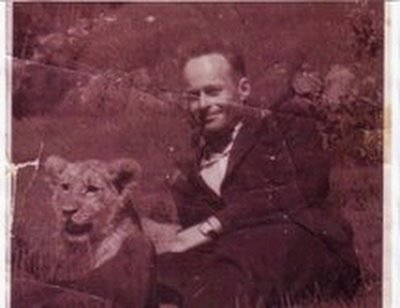
- Dov Gazit and lion cub for Jerusalem Biblical Zoo, 1943
- Born: Borys Reuvenovich Grobshtein; June 17, 1908; Baku
- Died: 1986 (aged 77–78)
- Education: Saint Petersburg State Institute of Technology
- Relatives: Solomon Grobshtein (brother)

Dov Gazit (Hebrew: דב גזית, June 17, 1908 — 1986) came to Israel from Baku, Azerbaijan by way of the Russian Gulags. He joined the Haganah, and rose to chief-commander of the IAF (Israeli Air Force) Technical School in Haifa.

While serving in Africa, he acquired a lion cub, which became the first lion in Dr. Aharon Shulov's Jerusalem Biblical Zoo.

== Early life ==
Dov Gazit was born Borys (shortened form of the Russian name Borislav) Reuvenovich or Romanovich Grobshtein (Russian: Борис Рувинович/Романович Гробштейн) on June 17, 1908 in Baku, Azerbaijan. He was the brother of Solomon Grobshtein, and one of three sons of Reuven (Roman) Grobshtein, an engineer in the Baku oil fields. When he was 8 years old (1916), his father was murdered during the Armenian-Tatar uprisings.

At age 18, Borys went to study at the Saint Petersburg State Institute of Technology, where became a member of a Zionist student group. The NKVD crashed a Zionist group meeting, and arrested all the participants, including Borys, who was convicted and sent to a Gulag in Siberia for three years.

After many applications for release, he was allowed to leave the Soviet Union and go to Palestine, without permission to see his family, nor to ever return to the Soviet Union.

Borys worked in the fields around Ra'anana, but later moved to Jerusalem, to the Zikhron Moshe neighbourhood, next door to Ephraim Katzir, a friend of Borys', and later to become the President of Israel.

After arriving in Palestine, Borys changed his name to Dov (Hebrew: דוב, lit: bear) Gazit (Hebrew: גָזִית, lit: huge stone dressed stone, ashlar, as used in construction of Solomon's Temple).

== Military service ==
While the British fought the German and Italian armies in the Arab Desert, Dov, and his friend, Yeri (Yerachmiel) Shrem, were sent to Eritrea, by the Israeli Air Service (Hebrew: שירות האוויר, lit: Sherut Avir), where he worked for British Airways. The two stayed in Eritrea for more than three years, constructing an airbase for the British. Their mandate was not only to build the airbase, but to learn how to develop and to manage the infrastructure which would be so important in sustaining the new state of Israel.

During his term of service in Africa, Dov also studied aeronautical engineering, and graduated from the British University in Egypt, in Cairo.

Dov served in the Haganah. He spent much of his time in Jerusalem, walking patrols through the streets of Jewish sections.

Dov Gazit was sent to Czechoslovakia, as part of the group that acquired and delivered the first aircraft, Avia S-199s and Spitfires, for the newly formed Israeli air force.

After Israel declared independence, Dov served as chief-commander of the IAF (Israeli Air Force) Technical School in Haifa. After his term, he continued to serve in additional management/administration positions at the school, as a Civilian Employee, with the rank equal to `Sgan Aluf` or 'Sa'al' (Lieutenant Colonel).

== Jerusalem Biblical Zoo ==
While stationed in Eritrea with his compatriot, Yeri (Yerachmiel) Shrem, Dov obtained a very important addition for the little Jerusalem Biblical Zoo, now called the Tisch Family Zoological Gardens).

Dr. Aaron Schulow (Aharon Shulov, who, like Dov Gazit, had also come to Palestine after being accused and jailed for Jewish Crimes in his native Russia (Dr. Shulov established the faculty of Zoology in the Hebrew University of Jerusalem), and the Jerusalem Biblical Zoo, asked Dov to find and send back to Jerusalem an African lion.

Dov found a lion cub for sale in the market. He took the Zoo's new acquisition back to his, where he and Yeri cared for the cub for several months. With the lion cub growing too large to keep in their quarters, he managed to get the cat to Alexandria, and on a boat to Palestine. The lion cub, the first lion in the Dr. Shulov's new zoo, was renamed Yehudah (Lion of Judah). Dr. Aharon Shulov wrote a history of the Jerusalem Biblical Zoo, and on pages 47–51, he detailed Dov Gazit's adventures in acquiring Fifi, and getting the cub from Africa to Jerusalem.

== Later life ==
Dov retired from the Air Force Technical School, and died in 1986, at the age of 78. He is buried in the cemetery at Hof haCarmel, on the slope of Mount Carmel.
