= Al-Kunayyisa =

Al-Kunayyisa الكنيّسة
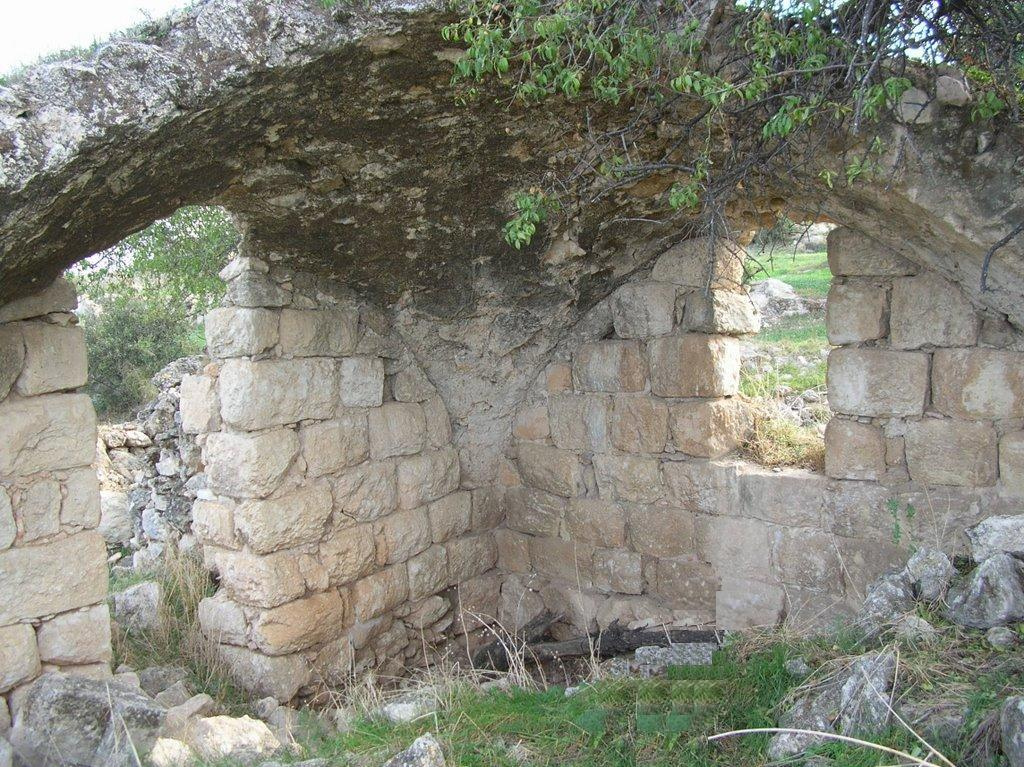
- Ruin in Al-Kunayyisa
- Etymology: The church
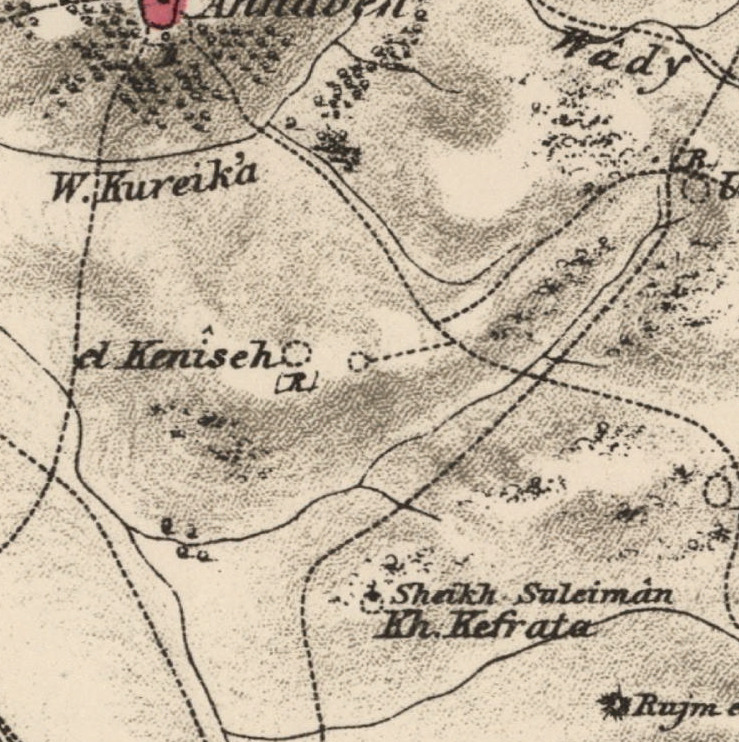
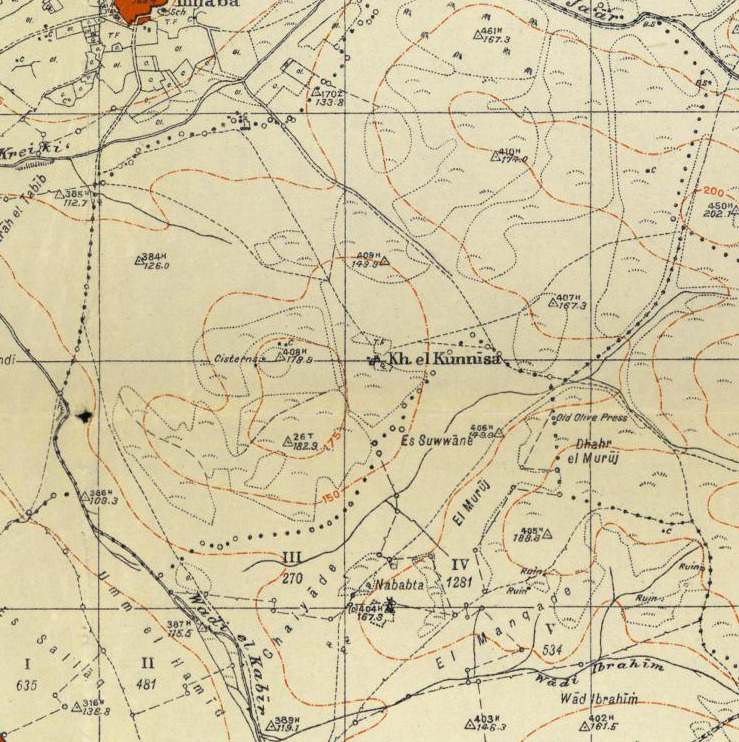
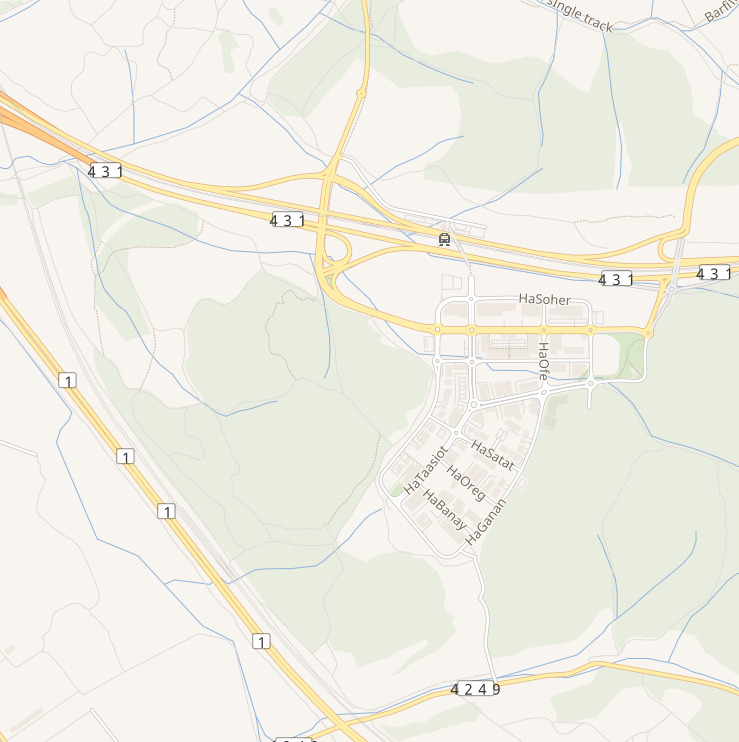
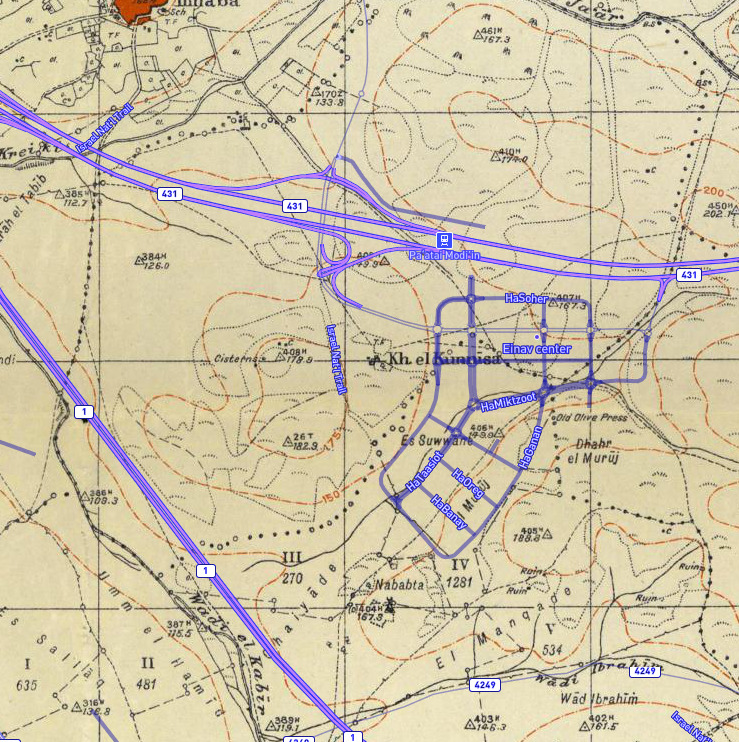
- 1870s map 1940s map modern map 1940s with modern overlay map A series of historical maps of the area around Al-Kunayyisa (click the buttons)

- Location within Mandatory Palestine
- Coordinates: 31°53′18″N 34°57′27″E
- Palestine grid: 146/144
- Geopolitical entity: Mandatory Palestine
- Subdistrict: Ramle
- Date of depopulation: July 10, 1948

Area
  - Total: 3,872 dunams (3.872 km^{2}; 1.495 sq mi)

Population (1945)
  - Total: 40
- Cause(s) of depopulation: Military assault by Yishuv forces

Al-Kunayyisa (Arabic: الكنيسة) was a small Palestinian Arab village in the Ramle Subdistrict. It was depopulated during the 1948 Arab–Israeli War on July 10, 1948, under the first stage of Operation Dani. It was located 12 km southeast of Ramla.

== Etymology ==
The name of the site, variously rendered al-Kunaysah /li-Knaysi/ is of Arabic origin and means "the little church". The name probably refers to the remains of an ancient building on the upper part of the mound.

== History ==
In 1552, al-Kunayyisa was an inhabited village. Haseki Hürrem Sultan, the favourite wife of Suleiman the Magnificent, endowed the tax revenues of al-Kunaysa to its Haseki Sultan Imaret in Jerusalem. Administratively, al-Kunayyisa belonged to the Sub-district of Ramla in the District of Gaza.

In 1838, it was noted it was noted as a place "in ruins or deserted", called el-Kuneiseh in the Lydda District.

In 1883, the PEF's Survey of Western Palestine (SWP) noted "Foundations and traces of ruins."

By the beginning of the 20th century, residents from Tirat Ramallah settled the site, establishing it as a dependency – or satellite village – of their home village.

=== British Mandate era ===
In the 1931 census of Palestine Al-Kunayyisa was counted with Innaba, together they had 1135 Muslim inhabitants, in 288 houses.

In the 1945 statistics Al-Kunayyisa had a population of 40 Muslims, with 3,872 dunams of land. Of this, a 64 dunams were used for plantations and irrigable land, 2,432 were used for cereals, while 20 dunams were classified as built-up areas.

A khirba to the east contains rugged stone walls and building remains.

=== 1948, aftermath ===
Al-Kunayyisa became depopulated after a military assault on July 10, 1948.

On 20 August 1948, Al-Kunayyisa was one of 32 Palestinian villagers whose land was given to the JNF for establishing Jewish settlements. Al-Kunayyisas land was given to Mishmar Ayalon. However, according to Walid Khalidi, Mishmar Ayalon is on the land of Al-Qubab.

In 1992 the village site was described: "From a distance, the site looks like a big stone pile overgrown with a thicket of thorns. More than thirty partially destroyed buildings, including houses, still stand. The remains of arched doors and windows are visible. Fig, almond, olive, and pomegranate trees and cactuses grow among the buildings. The lands in the vicinity are cultivated by the nearby kibbutz; some are planted with cotton."

== Bibliography ==
- Conder, C.R.; Kitchener, H.H. (1883). The Survey of Western Palestine: Memoirs of the Topography, Orography, Hydrography, and Archaeology. Vol. 3. London: Committee of the Palestine Exploration Fund.
- Department of Statistics (1945). Village Statistics, April, 1945. Government of Palestine.
- Hadawi, S. (1970). Village Statistics of 1945: A Classification of Land and Area ownership in Palestine. Palestine Liberation Organization Research Center. Archived from the original on 2018-12-08.
- Khalidi, W. (1992). All That Remains: The Palestinian Villages Occupied and Depopulated by Israel in 1948. Washington D.C.: Institute for Palestine Studies. ISBN 0-88728-224-5.
- Mills, E., ed. (1932). Census of Palestine 1931. Population of Villages, Towns and Administrative Areas. Jerusalem: Government of Palestine.
- Morris, B. (2004). The Birth of the Palestinian Refugee Problem Revisited. Cambridge University Press. ISBN 978-0-521-00967-6.
- Palmer, E.H. (1881). The Survey of Western Palestine: Arabic and English Name Lists Collected During the Survey by Lieutenants Conder and Kitchener, R. E. Transliterated and Explained by E.H. Palmer. Committee of the Palestine Exploration Fund.
- Robinson, E.; Smith, E. (1841). Biblical Researches in Palestine, Mount Sinai and Arabia Petraea: A Journal of Travels in the year 1838. Vol. 3. Boston: Crocker & Brewster.
