= Osama Badary =

Egyptian professor of clinical pharmacy

- Education: Cairo University (BS 1983); Al-Azhar University (MS 1988, PhD 1991); University of Georgia
- Known for: Chairman of NODCAR (2013–2019); Vice Dean of Pharmacy at BUE; contributions to the African Medicines Agency framework
- Awards: Yamagiwa-Yoshida (YY) Memorial International Cancer Study Grant (1999); Shoman Award for Arab Scientists (2000); Egyptian State Merit Award in Medical Sciences (2017); African Academy of Sciences Fellow (2020)
- Scientific career
- Fields: Toxicology, pharmacogenomics, precision medicine, drug regulation

Osama A. Badary is an Egyptian professor of Clinical Pharmacy at the British University in Egypt. He is the Vice Dean Pharmaceutical Research Faculty of Pharmacy. Previously, he held the positions of Vice Dean for Postgraduate Studies and Research, as well as Chairman of National Organization for Drug Control and Research (NODCAR), Cairo, Egypt.

== Education ==
He obtained his first degree in Pharmaceutical Sciences, from the Faculty of Pharmacy at Cairo University in 1983. In 1986, he obtained a diploma in Biochemical Analysis from a similar Faculty at Al- Azhar University, Egypt in 1986. In 1988, he earned his master's degree in pharmaceutical sciences with specialty in Pharmacology and Toxicology from Al-Azhar University, Egypt. In 1991, he obtained his PhD Pharmaceutical Sciences from Al-Azhar University and the University of Georgia.

== Career ==
In 2002, Badary became the Head of Department of Pharmacology and Toxicology, Faculty of Pharmacy, Helwan University, Helwan, Cairo, Egypt. In 2006, he was appointed as the Vice Dean of the same Faculty. In 2013, he was nominated as the Chairman of National Organization for Drug Control and Research, Cairo and in 2019, he was appointed as Vice Dean of Pharmaceutical Research Faculty of Pharmacy, the British University in Egypt BUE Cairo Egypt. He is a member of the Alexander von Humboldt Foundation, Deutscher Akademischer Austauschd and Union for International Cancer Control and American Association for Cancer Research.

== Awards ==
In 1999, Badary received the Yamagiwa-Yoshida (YY) Memorial International Cancer Study Grant from the Union for International Cancer Control (UICC) to conduct advanced research in cancer pharmacology. In 2000, he received the Abdul Hameed Shoman Award for Arab Researchers in recognition of his scientific contributions to medical and pharmaceutical sciences. In 2017, he was awarded Egypt's State Appreciation Award in Medical Sciences for his contributions to pharmaceutical research. In 2020, Badary was elected a Fellow of the African Academy of Sciences for his contributions to pharmacology and drug regulation.
