= Ronald McCaffer =

Ronald McCaffer (1943 - 2026) was Emeritus Professor of Construction Management at Loughborough University in Loughborough, England. He was a specialist in the management of the processes, technology, contractual and procurement systems of the construction industry.

== Biography ==
=== Early life and education ===
McCaffer was born in Glasgow, Scotland. He received a BSc in Civil Engineering from Strathclyde University in 1965. He was awarded PhD in 1977 from Loughborough University and DSc in 1998 from University of Strathclyde.

=== Academics career ===
At Loughborough University, McCaffer has been head of civil engineering (1987–1993), dean of engineering (1992–1997), deputy vice-chancellor (1997–2002), director of strategic business partnerships, innovation and knowledge transfer (2002–2006), and emeritus professor (since 2009).

Other appointments have included duties at the University of Technology, Malaysia, University of Hong Kong, University of New South Wales and visiting professor at Glasgow Caledonian University.

=== Honours ===
McCaffer was a Fellow of the Royal Academy of Engineering (1991), Fellow of the Royal Society of Edinburgh (2009), Fellow of the Royal Academy of Engineering, Fellow of the Institution of Civil Engineers and Fellow of the Chartered Institute of Building.

He was a member of the board of trustees of the British University in Egypt, and previously a member of Innovation East Midlands, a member of the Engineering Construction Industry Training Board and member of Court at Cranfield University.

== Books ==
- Modern Construction Management
- Management of Off Highway Plant and Equipment
- Worked Examples in Construction Management
