= Solomon Grobshtein =

Azerbaijani engineer and politician

Solomon Romanovich (or Reuvenovich) Grobshtein was a prominent Soviet scientist and one of the founders and organizers of the Azeri oil industry. He was born in Baku, Azerbaijan.

Grobshtein was head of the engineering control board in Azerbaijan, authored scientific books and was credited with several inventions, including a flow control valve for oil and gas wells (United States patent 3332438, published on July 25, 1967) invented by him and his team, which included Abdullaev Asker Alekper Ogly, Alizade Fuad Agasamedovich, Aslanov Mukhtar Makhmud Ogly, Vodovzov Genrikh Zalmanovich, and Ragimova Elmira Mamed Kyzy, at the Nauchno-Issledovatelsky i Proektny Institute.

In 1951, he, and the team led by A. K. Aliyev, were awarded the State Premium for achievements in exploration, drilling, production, exploitation, construction of offshore oil wells.

From 1950 to 1954, Grobshtein was elected to the Supreme Soviet of Azerbaijan SSR.

Grobshtein was the brother of Dov Gazit (born Borys Grobshtein).
