= Gabi (elephant) =

First elephant conceived in Israel through artificial insemination

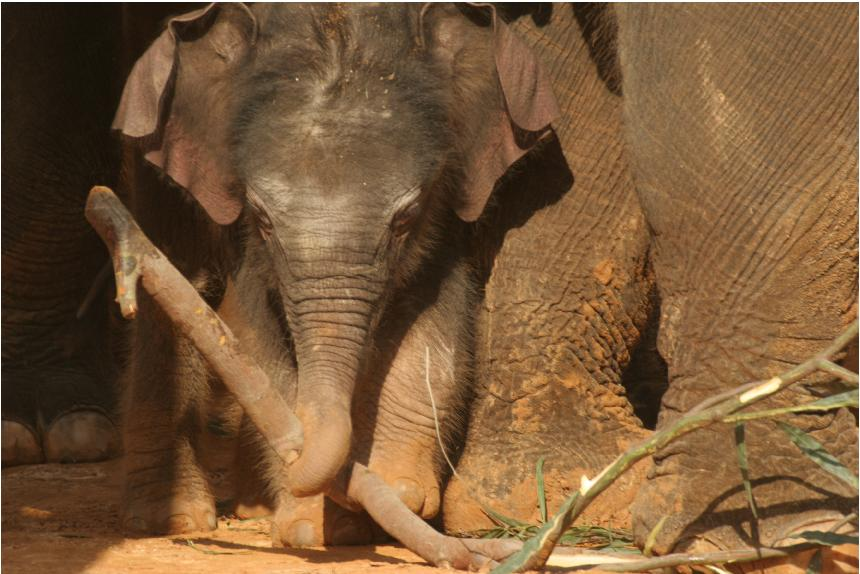
Gabi in 2006

Gabi (born 10 December 2005), also known as Boon-Chooi, is the first elephant conceived in Israel through artificial insemination. His 6-hour birth was viewed by over 350,000 people in 108 countries via live web streaming on the website of the Jerusalem Biblical Zoo, which coordinated the pregnancy and birth through its elephant artificial insemination program. In 2010, Gabi was moved to the Gaziantep Zoo in Turkey.

== Background ==
The Asian elephant enclosure at the zoo was constructed in 1993 with the help of Jerusalem mayor Teddy Kollek's Jerusalem Foundation, which also raised funds to bring in female Asian elephants from Thailand at a cost of $50,000 apiece. The zoo obtained its bull elephant as a 5-year-old in September 2001 from the Ramat Gan Safari. The zoo named its bull elephant "Teddy," and one of its female elephants, "Tamar," in honor of the mayor and his wife. However, attempts to mate Teddy with the female elephants did not produce a natural birth.

After years of research and in response to requests by other organizations for the zoo to take part in a trial, Dr. Gabi Eshkar, chief veterinarian of the zoo, initiated the elephant artificial insemination project. Tamar was selected for the project and her reproductive cycle was closely monitored. When the timing was right, sperm was obtained from Emmett, a bull elephant living in the Whipsnade Wild Animal Park in Bedfordshire, England, and flown to Israel on dry ice. The pregnancy was achieved after four tries over two years. The project was carried out in conjunction with a team from the Reproduction Management Institute for Zoo Biology and Wildlife Research of Berlin.

At age 20 Tamar was considered a high-risk pregnancy case, as elephants normally begin conceiving between the ages of 12 and 15, and this was Tamar's first pregnancy. Throughout the 21-month pregnancy, dozens of ultrasounds were taken of the elephant's 1.5-metre (4 ft 11 in) long reproductive system; some of these ultrasounds were published on the zoo's website to whet public interest. Physicians at the obstetrics and gynecology department of Hadassah Medical Center analyzed blood samples to monitor the pregnancy and predict the onset of labor, which they pinpointed to the day.

== Birth and early life ==
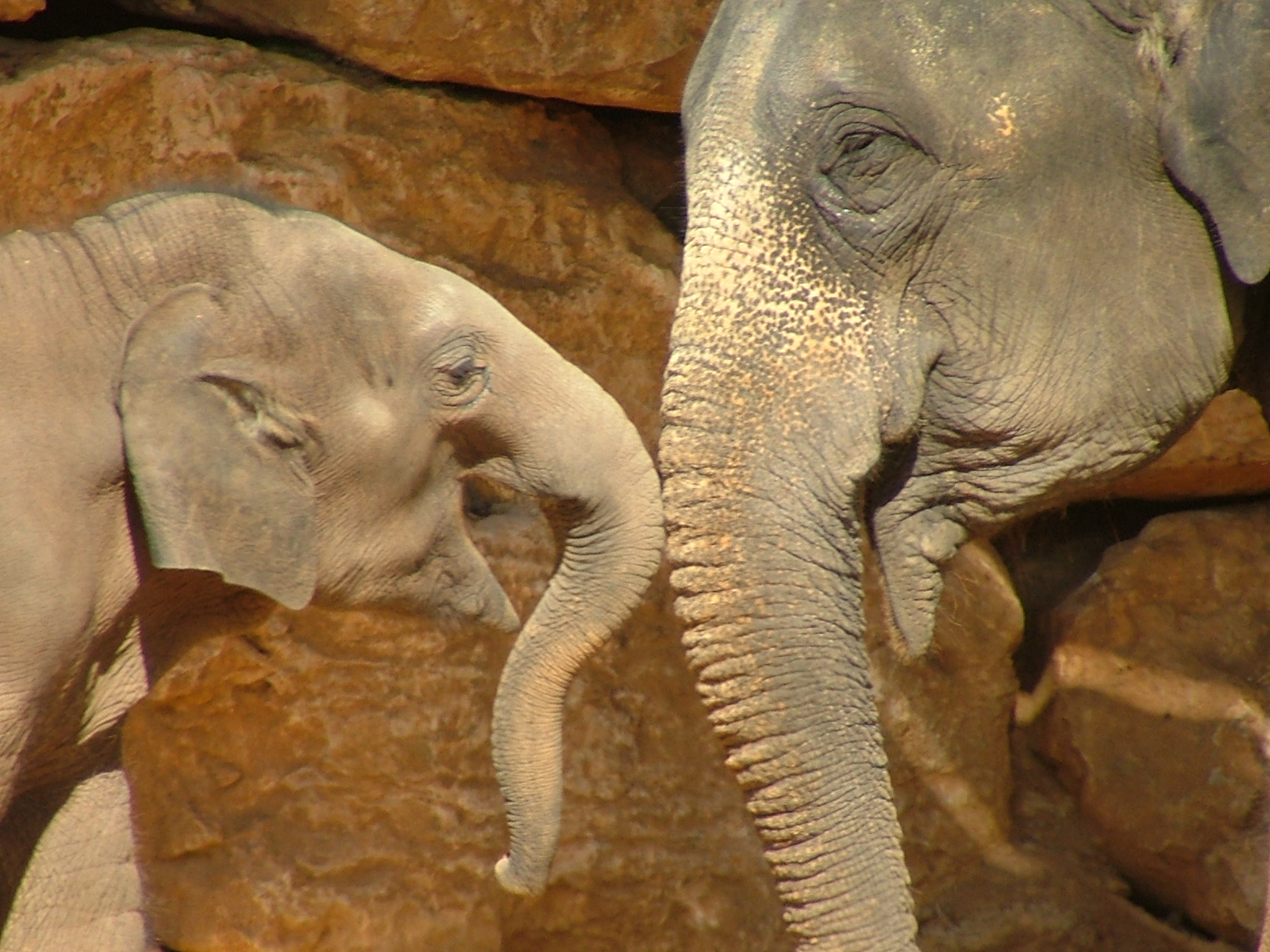
The year-old Gabi (left) with his mother Tamar in the elephant enclosure, January 2007.

The birth of Gabi was viewed by over 350,000 people in 108 countries via live web streaming on the zoo's website. The veterinarians halted the webcast at the 4-hour mark, fearing complications from labor. After consulting with two overseas veterinarians and a gynecologist in Israel, the zoo's head veterinarian gave Tamar a calcium injection, massaged her body, and tied down her leg to speed up the birth. Two hours later, Gabi was born.

The calf, weighing in at 198 pounds (90 kg), was born at 6:10 a.m. on Saturday, 10 December 2005. Concerns that Tamar, who was raised in captivity, would not bond with her calf proved groundless. Right after the birth, veterinarians wrapped the newborn calf in towels and sawdust to warm him, and then handed him over to his mother, who nursed him. Zookeepers named the baby elephant after Dr. Gabi Eshkar, who had been killed in a traffic accident in 2004.

Gabi was an instant hit with zoo visitors. His playful and energetic nature made him one of the zoo's main attractions. He was always on the go, and his keepers found him hard to pin down for weigh-ins. He often acted up while the other elephants were going about their daily routine. On 15 December 2006 the zoo held a first-birthday party for Gabi, complete with balloons and presents for visitors and a 100-kilogram (220 lb) birthday cake for Gabi prepared by professional chefs at the Tadmor School for Hotel Management.

== Move to Turkey ==
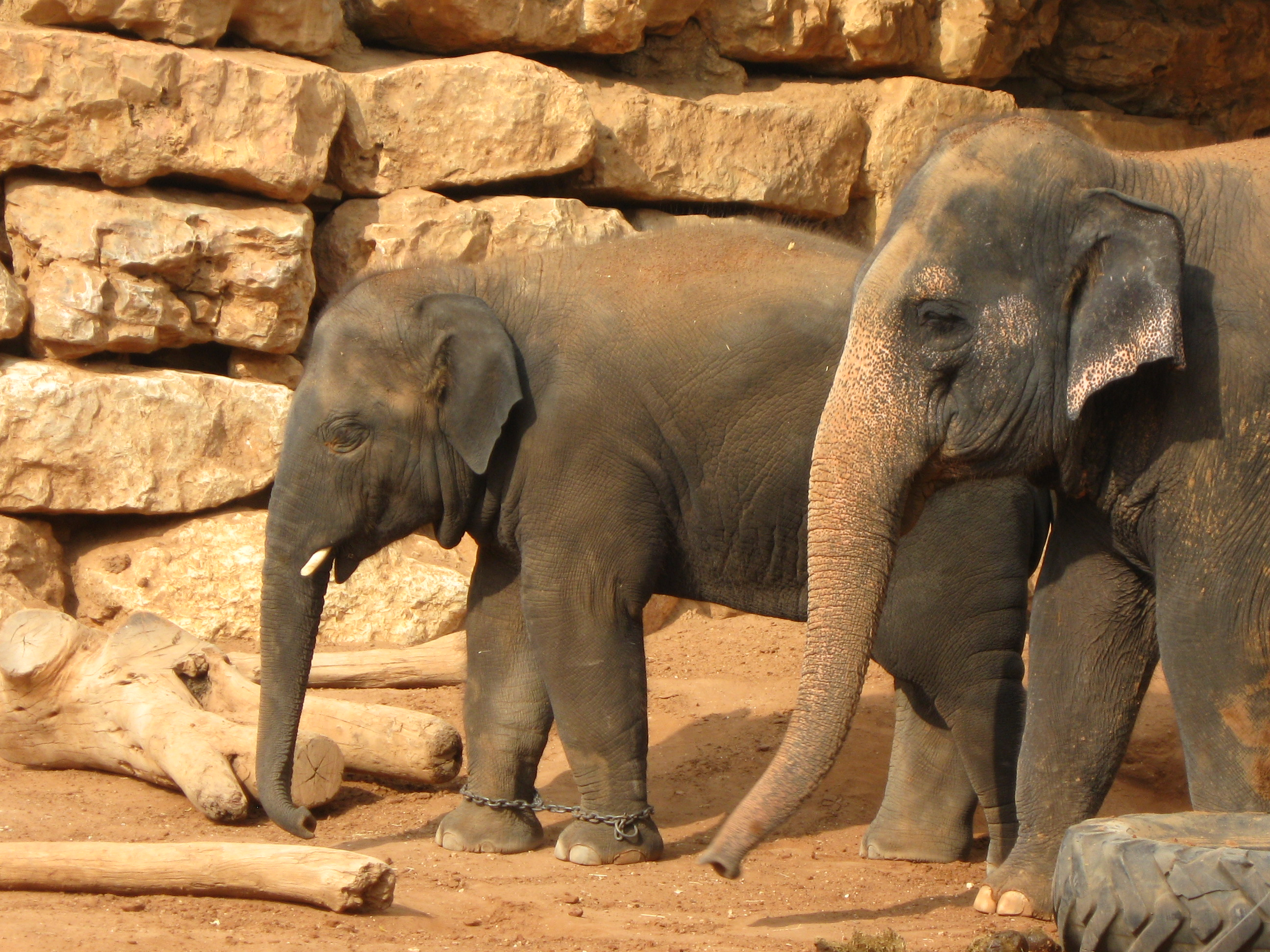
Gabi (left) and Tamar, October 2009.

Gabi lived in the same enclosure with his mother Tamar and the zoo's three other female elephants for nearly 5 years. By 2010, however, Gabi was growing increasingly aggressive and anti-social — typical behavior for a 5-year-old bull elephant. The zoo decided to send him to the Gaziantep Zoo in Turkey, where it was hoped he would sire his own offspring and thereby increase the number of Asian elephants in captivity.

For several months before the move, zookeepers trained Gabi to enter and remain inside the special cage built for the sea voyage. On Sunday night, 3 October 2010, Gabi was sent by truck to the Port of Haifa, where he was joined by two other Asian elephants, a hippopotamus, zebras and several lemurs from the Ramat Gan Safari. On October 4, the entire group was shipped to Turkey. The animals arrived the next day and were sent by truck to Gaziantep. Gabi and the other two elephants became the first elephants at the Gaziantep Zoo.

== Other fertilization attempts ==
In 2007, the Jerusalem Zoo successfully impregnated another of its female elephants, Abigail. In July 2009, however, the 32-year-old elephant and her unborn calf died during complications from labor.

== See also ==
- List of individual elephants
