= Mohamed Loutfi =

Mohamed Loutfi MBE
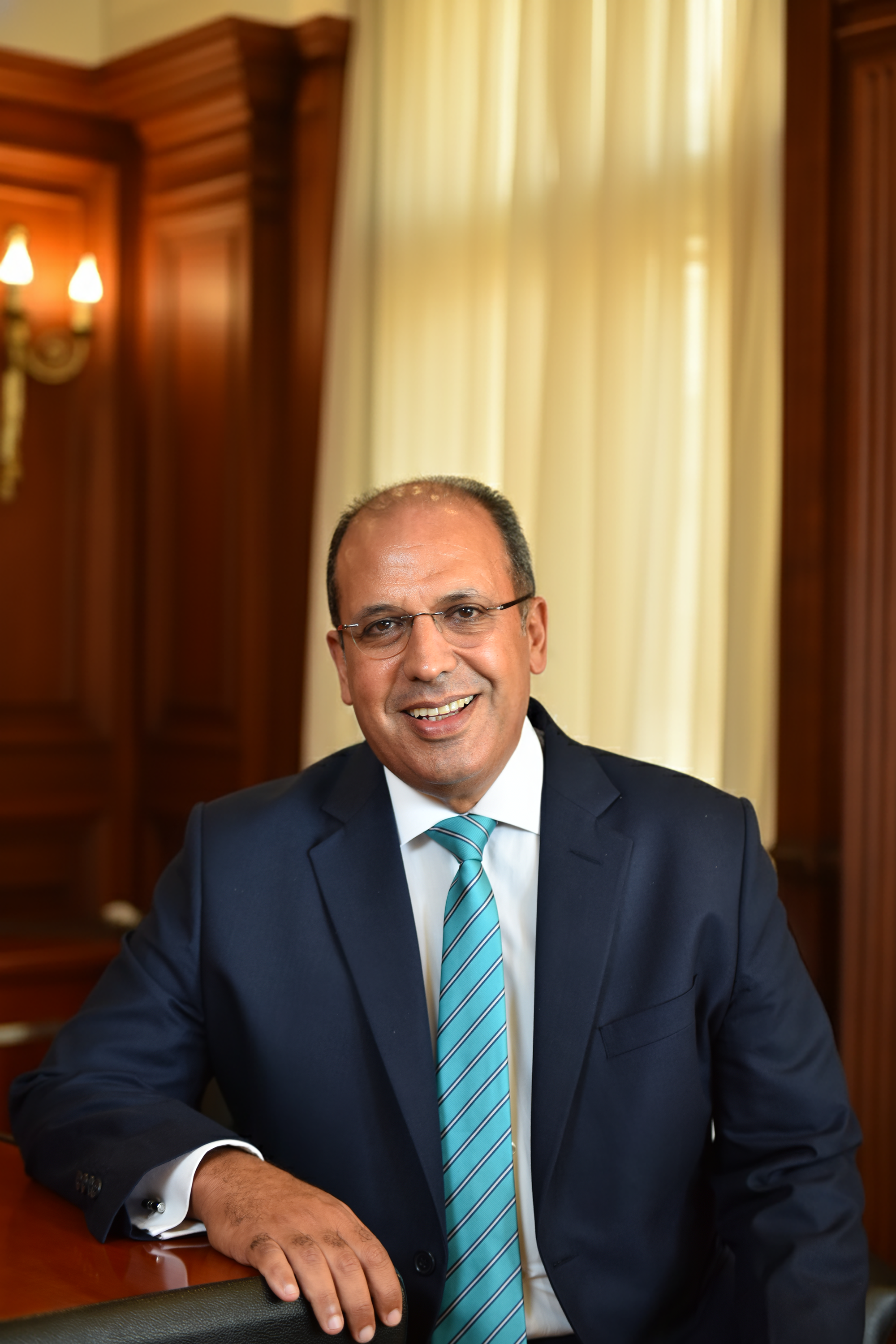

President and Vice-Chancellor of the British University in Egypt
- Incumbent
- Assumed office September 2021
- Preceded by: Interim appointment

Personal details
- Born: 1967 (age 58–59) Alexandria, Egypt
- Education: Alexandria University (BSc, MSc); University of Bergen; University of Sunderland (PhD)
- Profession: Academic
- Awards: Member of the Order of the British Empire (2025); Honorary Doctorate of Education, University of Sunderland (2023)

Mohamed Loutfi MBE (born 1967) is an Egyptian British academic who has served as the President and Vice-Chancellor of the British University in Egypt since September 2021.

Loutfi was appointed a Member of the Order of the British Empire (MBE) in the 2025 King’s Birthday Honours for services to education in the United Kingdom and Egypt.

In October 2025, Loutfi was appointed to the Senate of Egypt by the President of Egypt, Abdel Fattah El-Sisi.

== Early life and education ==
Mohamed Loutfi was born in 1967 in Alexandria, Egypt. He earned his Bachelor of Science in economics and political science and Master of Science in information technology from Alexandria University. He continued studies in system dynamics at the University of Bergen, Norway, before completing his PhD in systems thinking at the University of Sunderland in 2000. In recognition of his contributions to education, Loutfi was awarded an Honorary Doctorate (Hon. Doctorate) of Education by the University of Sunderland in 2023.

== Career ==
Loutfi began his career at the University of Sunderland as a senior lecturer and later became the Head of Transnational Education.

Prior to joining BUE, Loutfi held the post of Vice-Chancellor's Special Envoy at Coventry University. He also served as Pro-Vice-Chancellor of Cardiff Metropolitan University and at the University of Sunderland.

In September 2021, Loutfi became the fifth President and Vice-Chancellor of the British University in Egypt (BUE), succeeding interim leadership.

Loutfi is the founder and Vice‑President of the Arab–European Leadership Network in Higher Education (ARELEN) and has served as a council member of the Magna Charta Observatory, becoming the first British‑Egyptian to hold this role.

== Bibliography ==
=== Selected publications ===
- Loutfi, Mohamed; Moscardini, Alfredo O.; Lawler, Kevin (6–10 August 2000). Using System Dynamics to analyse the Economic Impact of Tourism Multipliers (PDF). 18th International Conference of the System Dynamics Society. Bergen, Norway: System Dynamics Society. ISBN 0-9672914-2-9.
- Moscardini, Alfredo; Loutfi, Mohamed; Al-Qirem, Raed (17–21 July 2005). The Use of System Dynamics Models to evaluate the Credit Worthiness of firms (PDF). 23rd International Conference of the System Dynamics Society. Boston, Massachusetts: System Dynamics Society. ISBN 0-9745329-2-4.
- Modelling the Aggregate Consumption Function: A System Dynamic Approach (1998).
- Moscardini, Alfredo O.; Loutfi, Mohamed (20–24 July 2003). Systems Thinking and Economics Teaching. 21st International Conference of the System Dynamics Society. New York City, New York: System Dynamics Society. ISBN 0-9672914-8-8.

=== Books and guides ===
- Loutfi, Mohamed (20 September 2008). Higher Education in Egypt and the Middle East: A Magna Charta Universitatum Perspective (PDF). Past, Present and Future of the Magna Charta Universitatum: Celebrations of the XX Anniversary of the Magna Charta Universitatum. Bologna, Italy: Magna Charta Observatory.
- Kaissi, Bassem; Jammal, Ahmad; Loutfi, Mohamed; Abou Chahine, Sobhi (March 2008). Quality Assurance for Higher Education in Lebanon: Guide I – Introduction to Quality Management in Higher Education (Report). European Commission, Tempus Framework. Project ID: SCM-M014A05.
- Ayoubi, Rami M.; Loutfi, Mohamed (2016). "A Comprehensive Structure to Understand Outward Mobility: Reflections for University International Offices". Handbook of Internationalisation of Higher Education. International Association of Universities. pp. 79–96.
- Al Hallak, Louna; Ayoubi, Rami M.; Moscardini, Alfredo; Loutfi, Mohamed (3 April 2019). "A system dynamic model of student enrolment at the private higher education sector in Syria". Studies in Higher Education. 44 (4): 663–682. doi:10.1080/03075079.2017.1393061.
