= Aharon Shulov =

Israeli entomologist (1907–1997)

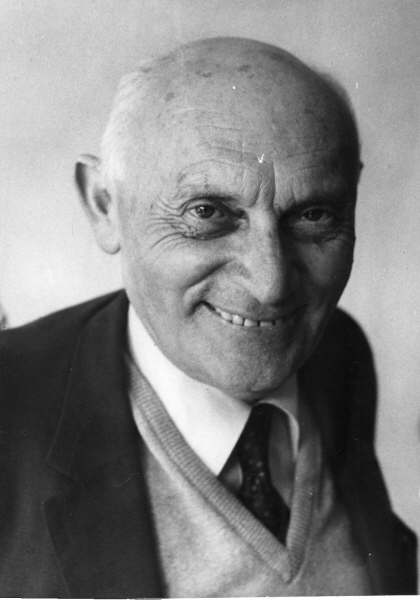

Professor Aharon Shulov (Hebrew: אהרון שולוב; also spelled Schulow, 1907–1997) was an Israeli entomologist and the founder of the Jerusalem Biblical Zoo.

== Biography ==
Aharon Shulov was born in Yelisavetgrad, Russian Empire, now in Ukraine. He was jailed on charges of Zionist activism. Upon his release in 1926, he immigrated to Palestine. Shulov had been interested in animals from childhood. He became a lecturer in zoology at the Hebrew University of Jerusalem. After earning a doctorate in Naples, he returned to the Hebrew University. He also spent time in Egypt studying the care of animals in subtropical climates.

== Research ==
In 1986, professor Shulov and his colleague Aviv Marx founded the Shulov Institute for Science. The company produces life-saving products and pain relievers, including a life-saving antiserum to treat yellow scorpion stings which is approved for use by the Israeli Ministry of Health and marketed to hospitals.

In April 2001, Shulov was posthumously granted a patent, with co-inventor Naphthali Primor, for a non-addictive, topical analgesic derived from snake venom. The patent was assigned to S.I.S. Shulov Institute for Science Ltd.

== Publications ==
Shulov published several books. The development of eggs of the Red Locust, Nomadacris septemfasciata (Serv.), and the African Migratory Locust, Locusta migratoria migratorioides (R. and F.), and its interruption under particular conditions of humidity was an academic work of entomology. His 1981 The Wolf Shall Dwell with the Lamb: 40 years of the Jerusalem Biblical Zoo tells the story of how the zoo acquired its first lion with the help of Dov Gazit.

Shulov also published articles on esters as insect repellants and attractants. In an entry in Campbell and Lack's 1985 Dictionary of Birds Shulov argued that the Hebrew word translated as "osprey" in the King James version of the Bible actually refers to the black vulture, Aegypius monachus.

== Biblical zoo ==
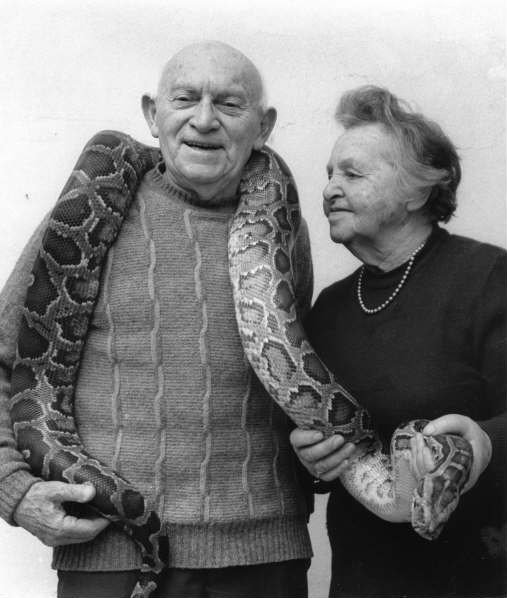
Shulov and wife, Yocheved, holding a python

Shulov is best known as the visionary and driving force behind the creation of the Biblical Zoo. He started the zoo in 1940, surprising his neighbours by feeding and keeping such animals as baby tigers in his home on Rabbi Kook Street in central Jerusalem. A year later, in the wake of the neighbors' objections to noise and smell, Shulov relocated to a site just over an acre in size on Shmuel HaNavi Street. The zoo remained there from 1941 until 1947, when land was offered on Mount Scopus. Shulov's objective was to acquire animals mentioned in the Bible. Although many species of the cat family mentioned in the Bible had long disappeared from the region, Shulov was able to import several big cats, and brought the first lion to the zoo. Professor Shulov served as the director of the zoo for 43 years, until his retirement. The zoo, now known as the Tisch Family Zoological Gardens, has developed into an internationally renowned zoo and research facility, and popular tourist destination.

== Commemoration ==
The Prof. Aharon Shulov Fund for the Study of Animals in Captivity, a joint initiative of Shulov's family, the Friends of the Zoo Association and the Jerusalem Biblical Zoo, offers one or more grants each year to support studies relating to the animal collection and conservation activities of the Jerusalem Biblical Zoo. The studies are focused on any of the Zoo's fields of interest: animal welfare and husbandry, animal reintroduction, reproduction of endangered species, conservation genetics, exotic animal nutrition and medical care, and more. Researchers from academic and non-academic institutions and university students (with preference given to Hebrew University students) are entitled to submit their research proposals to the Fund.

After a campaign by Shulov's family, supported by Ehud Olmert (then mayor of Jerusalem), a main road in the Malha neighborhood, leading to the entrance of the Zoo, was named Aharon Shulov Road.
