= Yehia Bahei El-Din =

Egyptian professor of materials Science

Professor Yehia Bahei El-Din FAAS
- يحيى بهاء الدين
- Education: Cairo University (BSC); Duke University (MSs, PhD)
- Scientific career
- Fields: Solids Mechanics; Fiber-reinforced composite
- Institutions: the British University in Egypt; Cairo University; Duke University; Rensselaer Polytechnic Institute; North Carolina State University; University of Utah

Yehia Bahei El-Din (Arabic: يحيى بهاء الدين) FAAS is an Egyptian professor of materials Science. He was the Dean of Engineering and, as of December 2022, the Vice-president for Research and Postgraduate Studies at the British University in Egypt.

== Education ==
He obtained his Bachelor of Science in Civil Engineering from Cairo University in 1972, Master of Science in Solid Mechanics and Composite Materials from Duke University in 1976, and Doctor of Philosophy from Duke in 1979.

== Career and research ==
El-Din is a professor at British University in Egypt. He was the Dean of Engineering and, as of December 2022, the Vice-president for Research and Postgraduate Studies and the founding director of the Centre for Advanced Materials at the British University in Egypt. However, he had taught previously in Cairo University, Duke University, Rensselaer Polytechnic Institute, North Carolina State University and the University of Utah.

El-Din's research focuses on solid mechanics of fiber-reinforced composite.

== Awards and honours ==
In 2018, El-Din was elected as a Fellow of African Academy of Sciences. In 2019, El-Din won the “Nile Award” in Advanced Technological Sciences from the Academy of Scientific Research and Technology (ASRT), Egypt.

== Selected publications ==
- Bahei-El-Din, Yehia A.; Dvorak, George J. (2008-01-01). Enhancement of blast resistance of sandwich plates. Composites Part B: Engineering. Marine Composites and Sandwich Structures. 39 (1): 120–127. doi:10.1016/j.compositesb.2007.02.006. ISSN 1359-8368.
- G. J. Dvorak, Y. A. Bahei-El-Din (1982-06-01). Plasticity Analysis of Fibrous Composites. Journal of Applied Mechanics, 49(2): 327-335, doi: https://doi.org/10.1115/1.3162088
- Dvorak, G. J.; Bahei-El-Din, Y. A. (1987-12-01). A bimodal plasticity theory of fibrous composite materials. Acta Mechanica. 69 (1): 219–241. doi:10.1007/BF01175723. ISSN 1619-6937.
- Dvorak, G. J.; Bahei-El-Din, Y. A. (1979-02-01). Elastic-plastic behavior of fibrous composites. Journal of the Mechanics and Physics of Solids. 27 (1): 51–72. doi:10.1016/0022-5096(79)90010-3. ISSN 0022-5096.
- Bahei-El-Din, Yehia A.; Dvorak, George J.; Fredricksen, Olivia J. (2006-12-01). A blast-tolerant sandwich plate design with a polyurea interlayer. International Journal of Solids and Structures. 43 (25): 7644–7658. doi:10.1016/j.ijsolstr.2006.03.021. ISSN 0020-7683
