= Yehia Massoud =

Academic in the field of computer science

- Education: MIT (PhD)
- Alma mater: Massachusetts Institute of Technology
- Awards: IEEE Fellow
- Scientific career
- Fields: Higher Education, Computer Science, Electrical and Computer Engineering, Systems Engineering,
- Institutions: Stevens Institute of Technology, Stanford University, MIT, WPI, Rice University
- Website: https://yehiamassoud.com/

Yehia Massoud has had significant progressive academic leadership and has been involved in forging and building effective partnerships with numerous academic and industrial institutions, and international organizations, and governmental funding agencies.

== Education ==
He received his Ph.D. degree in Electrical Engineering and Computer Science from Massachusetts Institute of Technology.

== Career ==
He was a Group Leader in the Advanced Technology Group at Synopsys Inc. in Mountain View, CA from 1999 to 2003, where he was awarded the Synopsys Special Recognition Engineering Award. He later joined Rice University in 2003 and became one of the fastest Rice faculty to be granted tenure in the department of Electrical Engineering and the Department of Computer Science in 2007. He was the ECE Department Head at WPI from 2012 to 2017. He strongly advocated for dynamic curricula that combine foundational competencies and knowledge breadth, along with a vibrant innovation mindset. During his five-year term as the department head, the department saw an unprecedented growth in research expenditures, research output, industrial partnerships, undergraduate and graduate student enrollments, unrestricted funds and gifts, and the visibility and recognition of the department, along with a 26-position improvement in the department rankings by U.S. News & World Report.

== Awards ==
He was selected as one of the ten MIT Alumni featured by the EECS department at MIT in 2012. He was a recipient of the Rising Star of Texas Medal in 2007, the National Science Foundation CAREER Award in 2005, the DAC fellowship and the Synopsys Special Recognition Engineering Award. He has been selected to the IEEE CAS Awards Nomination Committee, the IEEE Mac Valkenburg Award Selection Committee, the IEEE Nanotechnology Council, the IEEE Rebooting Computing Steering Committee, the IEEE ISCAS Steering Committee, and the IEEE/ACM GLSVLSI Steering Committee, as well as an official nominee for the Japan Prize.

== Research ==
He is a Fellow of the IEEE and was named a Distinguished Lecturer by the IEEE Circuits and Systems Society. He has served as the Editor of the Mixed-Signal Letters - the Americas, as an Associate Editor of the IEEE Transactions on Very Large Scale Integration Systems, and the IEEE Transactions on Circuits and Systems I, as well as a Guest Editor of a special issue of the IEEE TCAS-I. He also served as the 2016 IEEE MWCAS Technical Program Co-chair, as well as the 2009 General Program Co-chair and the 2007 Technical Program Co-chair of the ACM Great Lakes Symposium on VLSI. He received several Best Paper Award Nominations and two Best Paper Awards at the 2007 IEEE International Symposium on Quality Electronic Design and the 2011 IEEE International Conference on Nanotechnology. He has been a PI or a Co-PI on more than $28 Million of funded research from the NSF, DOD, SRC, and the industry.

Massoud has published more than 300 papers in leading peer-reviewed journals and conference publications. Hit research include machine learning, autonomous vehicles, healthcare systems, smart cities, intelligent transportation systems, and smart and embedded systems. Massoud's research group at Rice University [7][8][9] was responsible for developing the world's first realization of compressive sensing systems for signals. This DARPA-funded project provided an unprecedented one order of magnitude savings in power consumption and significant reductions in size and cost and has enabled the implementation of self-powered sensors for smart cities and ultra-low power biomedical implantable devices.
