= Jerusalem Biblical Zoo =

Zoo in Jerusalem

- Zoo logo

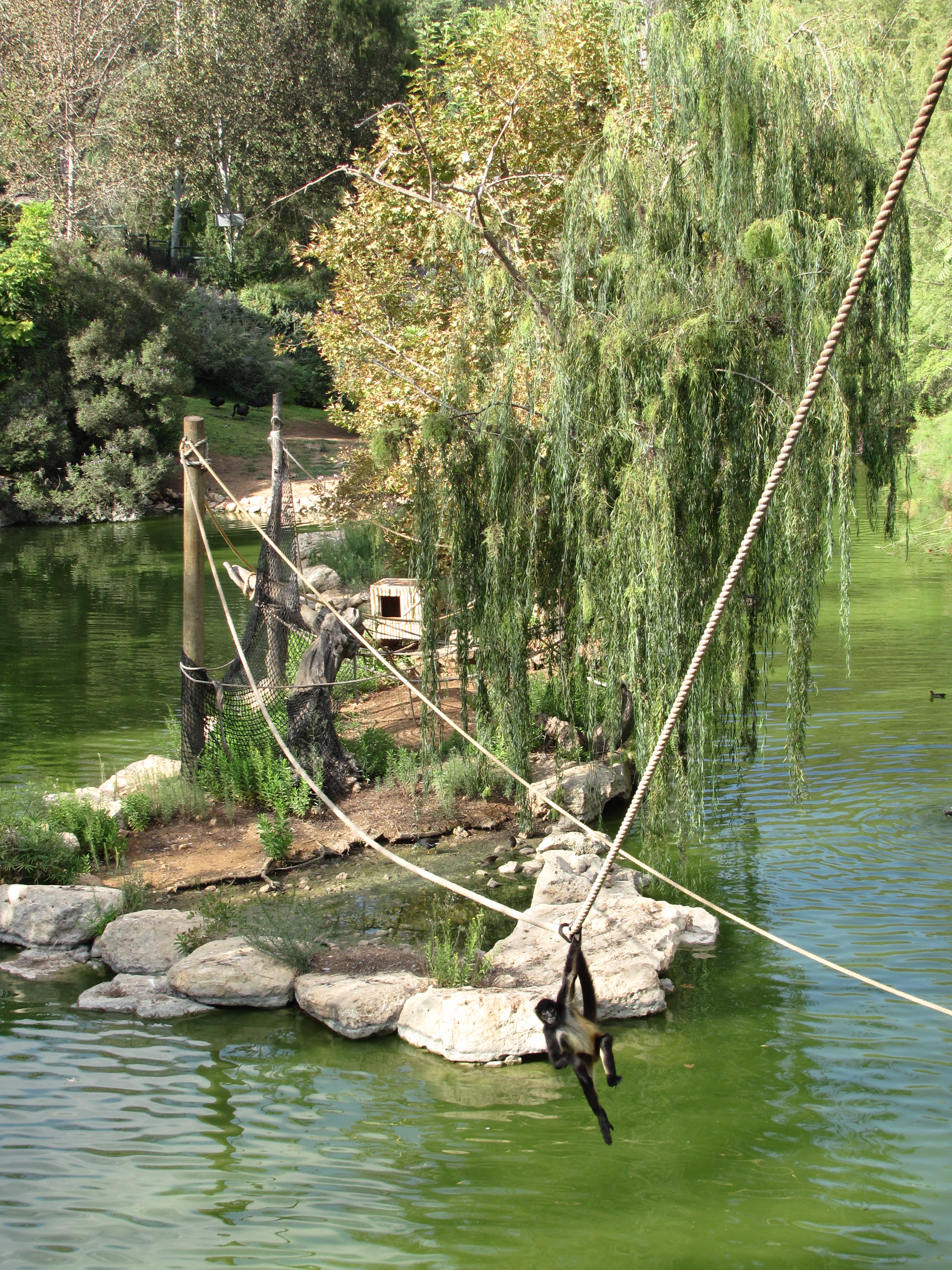
- A black-handed spider monkey swings on a rope over the artificial lake at the zoo.
- Interactive map of Jerusalem Biblical Zoo
- 31°44′58″N 35°10′37″E
- Date opened: 1940
- Location: Malha, Jerusalem, Israel
- Land area: 25 ha (62 acres)
- No. of animals: 2,200 (as of 2009)
- No. of species: 271 (as of 2009)
- Memberships: WAZA, EAZA, IZA, Species360
- Website: www.jerusalemzoo.org.il/en/biblical-zoo

The Tisch Family Biblical Zoo in Jerusalem (Hebrew: גן החיות התנ"כי בירושלים על שם משפחת טיש, Arabic: حديقة الحيوان الكتابية في أورشليم القدس), popularly known as the Jerusalem Biblical Zoo, is a zoo located in the Malha neighborhood of Jerusalem. It is famous for its Afro-Asiatic collection of wildlife, many of which are described in the Hebrew Bible, as well as for its success in breeding endangered species. According to Dun and Bradstreet, the Biblical Zoo was the most popular tourist attraction in Israel from 2005 to 2007, and logged a record 738,000 visitors in 2009. The zoo had about 55,000 members in 2009.

== History ==
=== Downtown Jerusalem (1940–1947) ===
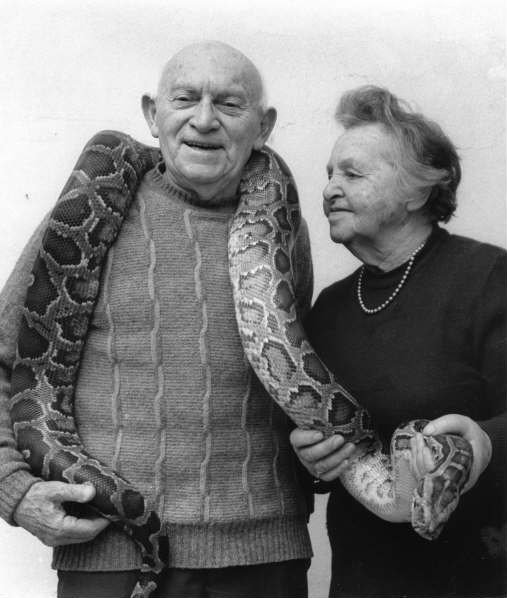
Aharon Shulov and his wife, Yocheved, holding a python

The Jerusalem Biblical Zoo opened in September 1940 as a small "animal corner" on Rabbi Kook Street in central Jerusalem. The zoo was founded by Aharon Shulov, a professor of zoology at the Hebrew University of Jerusalem, Mount Scopus. Among Shulov's goals were to provide a research facility for his students; to gather animals, reptiles and birds mentioned in the Bible; and, as he wrote in 1951, to break down the "invisible wall" between the intellectuals on Mount Scopus and the general public. The first animal in the Jerusalem Zoo was a desert monitor which arrived in 1940, brought by a group of British soldiers.

Early on, the zoo ran into several difficulties in its decision to focus on animals mentioned in the Bible. For one, the meaning of many names of animals, reptiles and birds in Scriptures is often uncertain; for example, nesher (Hebrew: נשר), commonly translated as "eagle", could also mean "vulture". More significantly, many of the animals mentioned in the Bible are now extinct in Israel due to over-hunting, destruction of natural habitats by rapid construction and development, illegal poisoning by farmers, and low birth rate. Zoo planners decided to branch beyond strictly biblical animals and include worldwide endangered species as well.

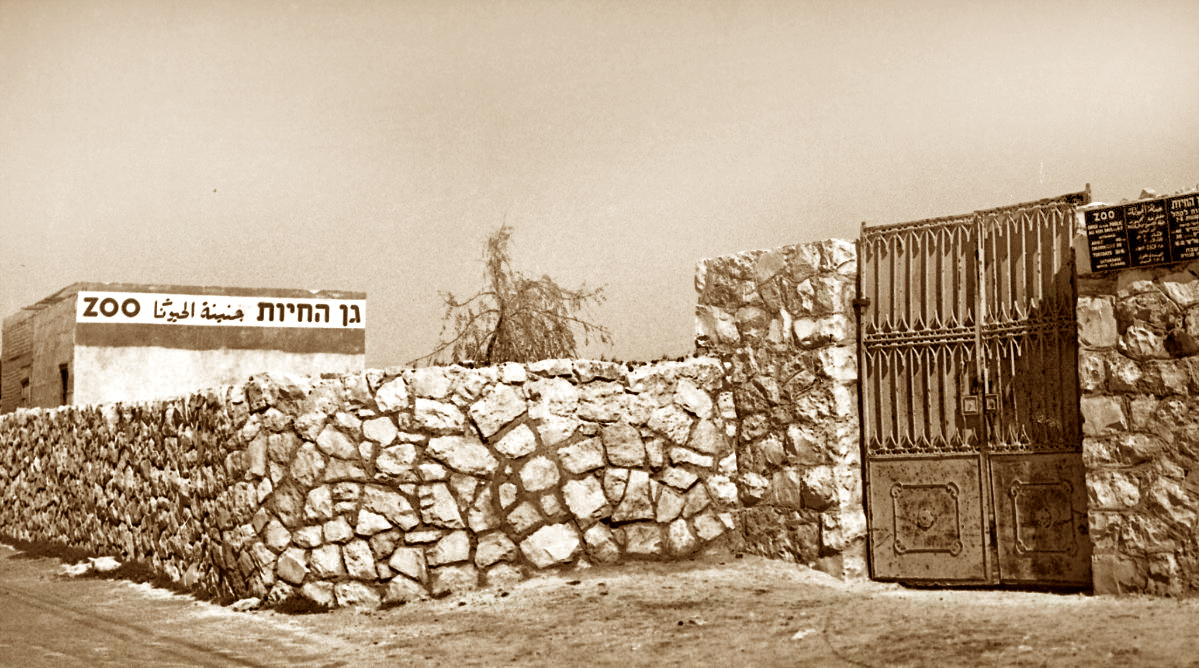
The zoo in the 1940s, probably on Shmuel HaNavi Street

The presence of the animal corner generated many complaints from residents in adjoining buildings due to the smell and noise, as well as the perceived danger of animal escapes. Due to the complaints, the zoo relocated in 1941 to a 4.5-dunam (0.45-hectare) lot on Shmuel HaNavi Street. Here, too, complaints were heard from the neighbors, but the zoo remained at this site for the next six years.

=== Mount Scopus (1947–1950) ===
In 1947 the zoo, which by now had 122 animals, relocated to a plot of land on Mount Scopus provided by Hebrew University. It remained there from 1947 to 1950. Its occupancy coincided with the 1948 Arab–Israeli War and the siege of Jerusalem, when food for the city's population was at a premium. Zookeepers resorted to hunting down stray dogs near garbage dumps in order to feed the carnivorous animals. Many of the carnivores died anyway, and other, non-dangerous species had to be released.

=== Romema (1950–1991) ===
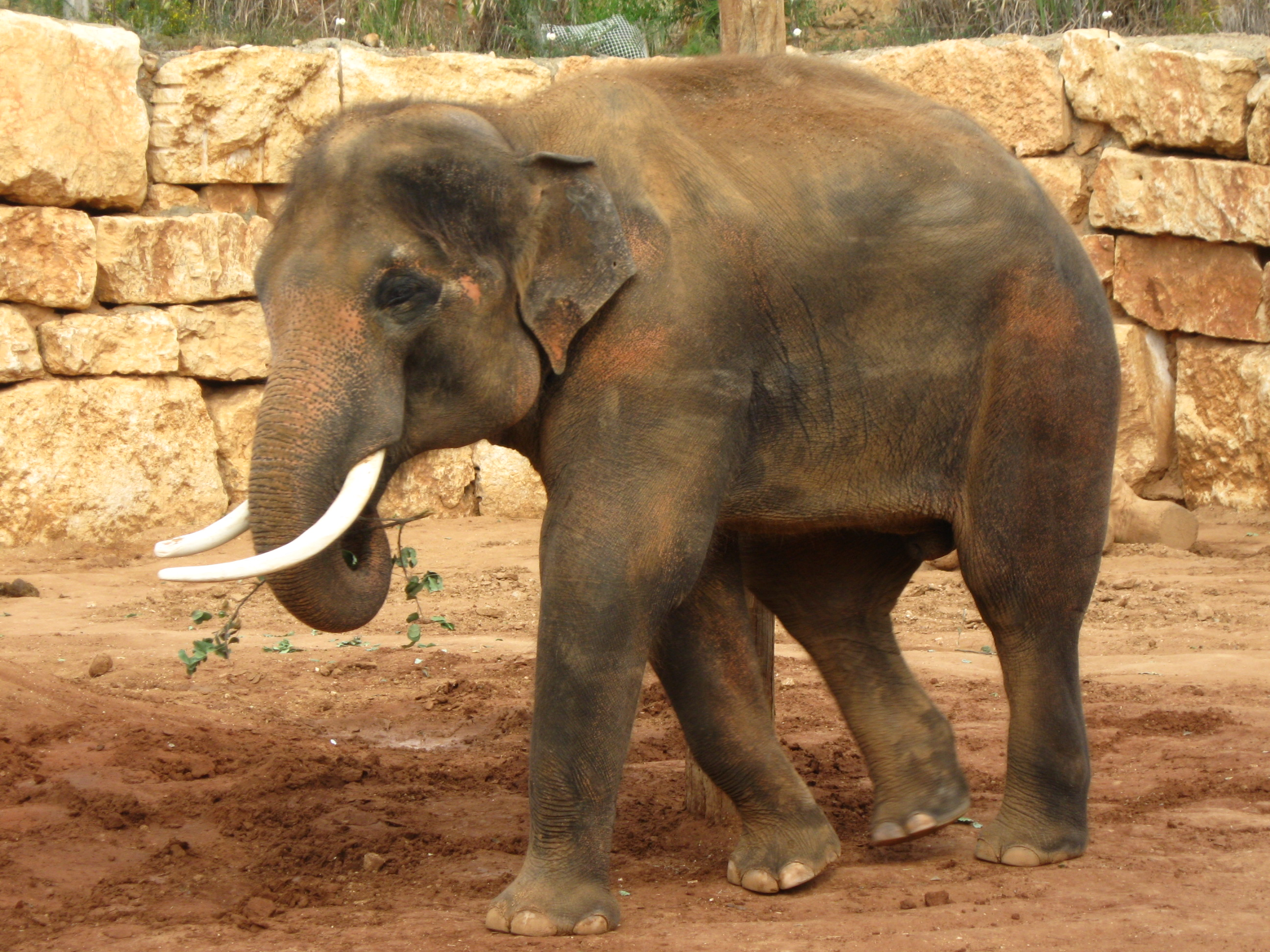
Teddy the elephant, named in honor of Jerusalem mayor and zoo fund-raiser Teddy Kollek

As part of the Israel–Jordan Armistice Agreements of 1949, access to Mount Scopus was restricted. The United Nations helped the zoo relocate to a 15-hectare (37-acre) lot in Givat Komuna, adjacent to the present-day neighborhoods of Romema. According to Shulov, when the zoo arrived in Romema, only two wolves, one hyena, one lion and one leopard were left.

The zoo remained in Romema from 1950 to 1991, becoming a beloved Jerusalem institution. About 30 percent of its attendance came from Haredi families from northern Jerusalem and Muslim families from East Jerusalem—two population groups that normally do not participate in the city's cultural offerings. The zoo grew to 11 hectares (28 acres) and more than 200 species, including most of the 130 animals mentioned in the Bible. Thanks to its breeding program, 11 species that had disappeared from Israel were reintroduced into nature reserves around the country, including the Syrian brown bear, the addax, and two types of fallow deer. Through gifts, trades with other zoos, and its success at breeding, the zoo's collection exceeded 500 animals by 1967. During the Six-Day War, however, 110 animals were killed by shrapnel and stray bullets.

The zoo was administered by a nonprofit corporation with representatives from Hebrew University, the Jerusalem Municipality, and the Israeli Ministries of Tourism and Education. From a financial standpoint, however, the zoo had little money. Shulov, who retired as director in 1983, often served as director without pay. The zoo was also considered inferior to the zoos of Tel Aviv and Haifa.

Jerusalem mayor Teddy Kollek, who took office in 1965, became one of the zoo's main supporters and fundraisers through his Jerusalem Foundation. Kollek promoted the idea of moving the zoo to a larger location and upgrading it to a state-of-the-art institution, as well as a tourist site that would appeal to secular and religious Jewish families and Arab families alike. Around 1990, under the auspices of the Jerusalem Foundation, the Tisch family of New York agreed to pay $5 million toward the $30 million cost of the project. Another $10 million was raised through sale of the lot in Romema, which was converted to housing. The Jerusalem municipality, the Israel Ministry of Tourism, the Jerusalem Foundation, and private sponsors also contributed.

=== Malha (1993–present) ===
The zoo closed its site in Romema in 1991 and reopened in the Malha valley, seven kilometres (4 1/2 mi) southwest of the city center, in 1993. In 2025, the head of the zoo's carnivores unit died after being mauled by a leopard that had escaped from its enclosure during a visitors tour.

== The zoo today ==
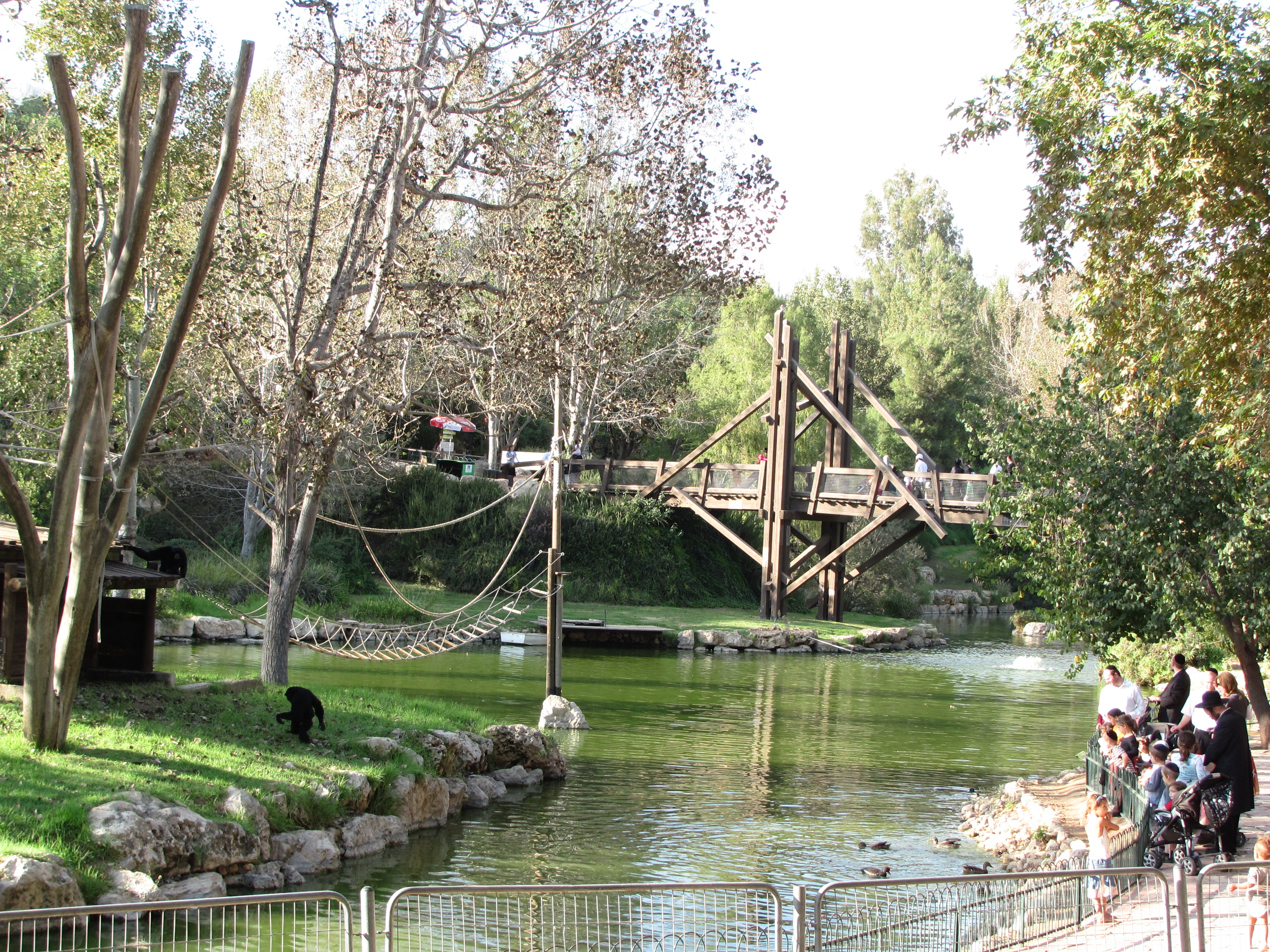
View of the artificial lake, with the siamang exhibit at left

The zoo, renamed the Tisch Family Zoological Gardens in Jerusalem, but still called the Jerusalem Biblical Zoo by the general public, opened for a preview period on 28 February 1993. It officially opened on 9 September 1993.

=== Design and layout ===
Designed by Miller-Blum & Associates Landscape Architects, and constructed by the Moriah Jerusalem Development Corporation, the zoo sits on 25 hectares (62 acres) in a valley surrounded by the hillside neighborhoods of Malha and Givat Masua. The park is landscaped with trees and shrubs native to Israel, many of which are mentioned in the Bible.

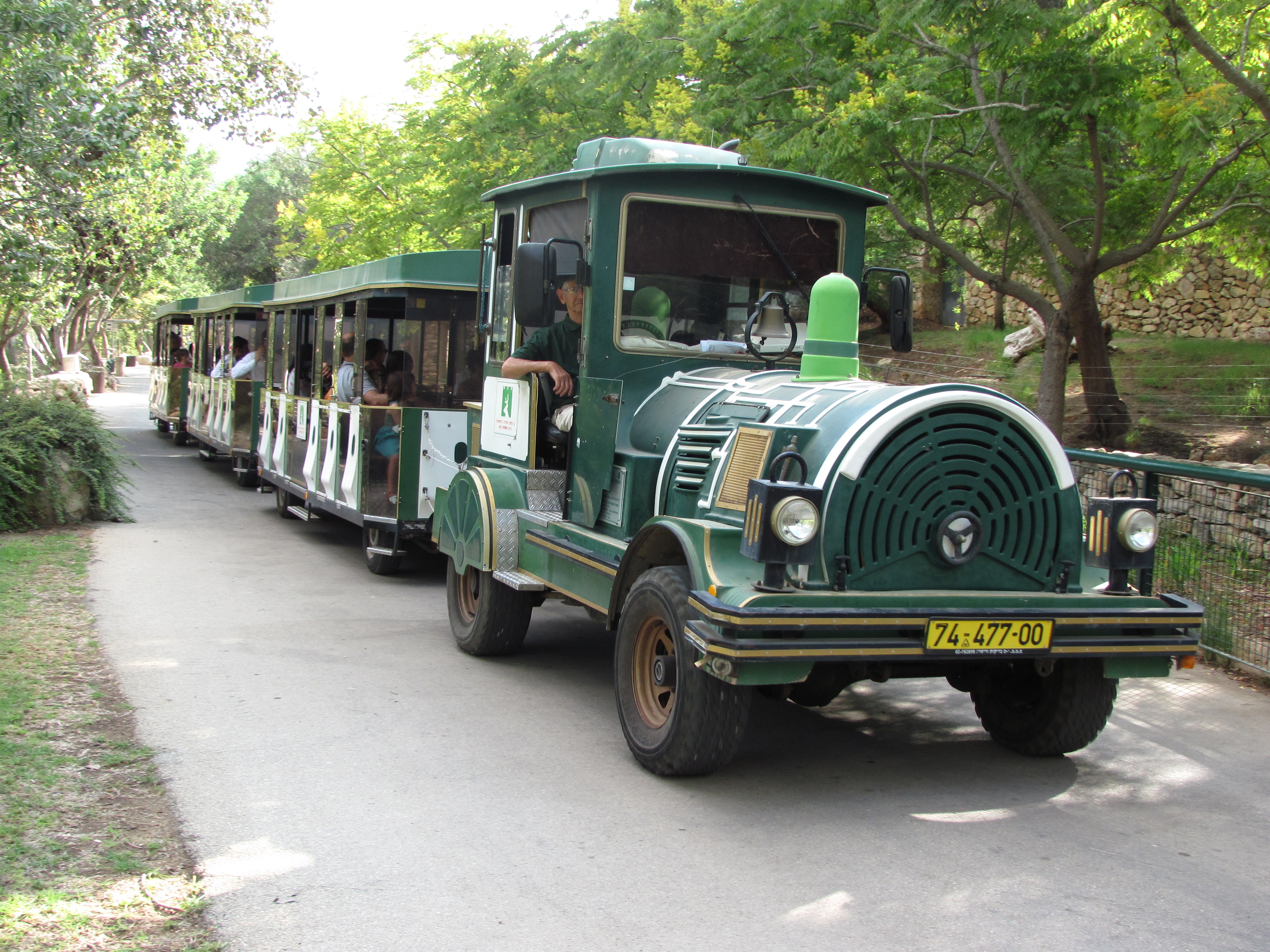
The zoo train

The zoo is built on two main levels. A motorized train takes visitors on a circular route from the lower level to the upper level. The entire park is wheelchair-accessible; each train can also accommodate one wheelchair.

The centerpiece of the lower level is an artificial lake which includes two islands of monkey exhibits. The lake is fed by a series of pools and waterfalls, beginning at an artificial waterfall called "Moses' Rock" (an allusion to the well of Miriam which provided water for the Israelites during their 40-year sojourn in the desert). Water is recycled and pumped back to Moses' Rock through an underground system.

At the western end of the park stands a two-story, boat-shaped wooden visitor center meant to resemble Noah's Ark. It contains an auditorium, an art gallery, a gift shop, a snack bar, and computer stations providing information on animals mentioned in the Bible.

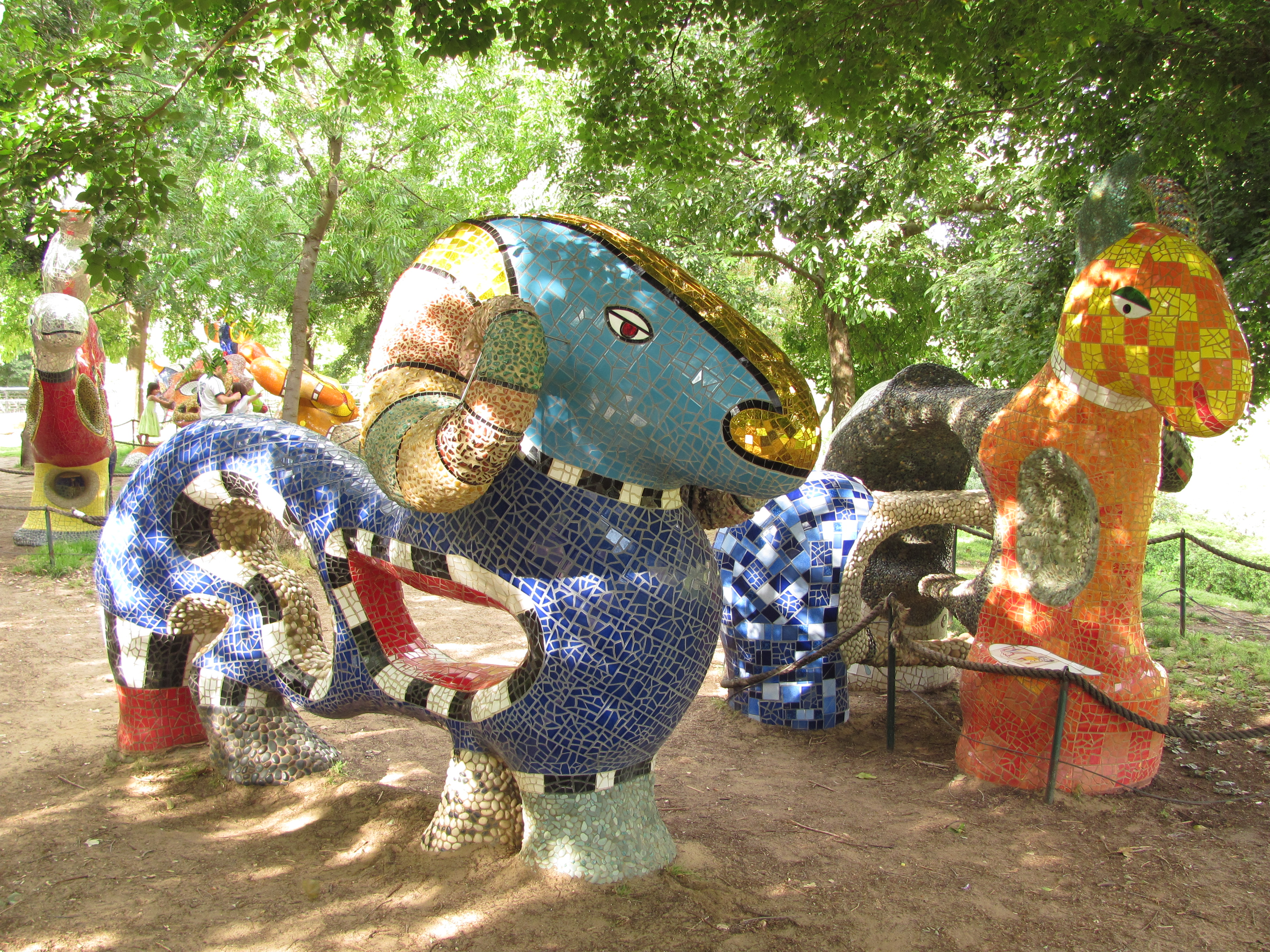
Phantasmagorical sculptures by French sculptor Niki de Saint Phalle in the Noah's Ark Sculpture Park

The zoo operates several snack bars and a coffee shop. Picnic tables and benches are situated throughout the park. There is also an animal-themed jungle gym for children and a sculpture garden containing 23 phantasmagorical animal sculptures decorated with stones, mirrors, and mosaics, which double as climbing toys, designed by French sculptor Niki de Saint Phalle, together with an underground Noah's Ark sculpture designed by Swiss architect Mario Botta. Children can also view 3D films of animals in a small theater near the entrance to the zoo.

=== Animal exhibits ===
The traditional zoo infrastructure of bars and cages has been replaced by open areas separated from the public by trenches, moats, bridges, and glass windows; outdoor exhibits also have an indoor shelter in case of bad weather. The only areas in which the public has direct contact with the animals are Lemur Land, the "petting pool" at the Wet Side Story aquatic exhibit, and the children's zoo, where children can pet and feed pygmy goats, sheep, rabbits and guinea pigs.

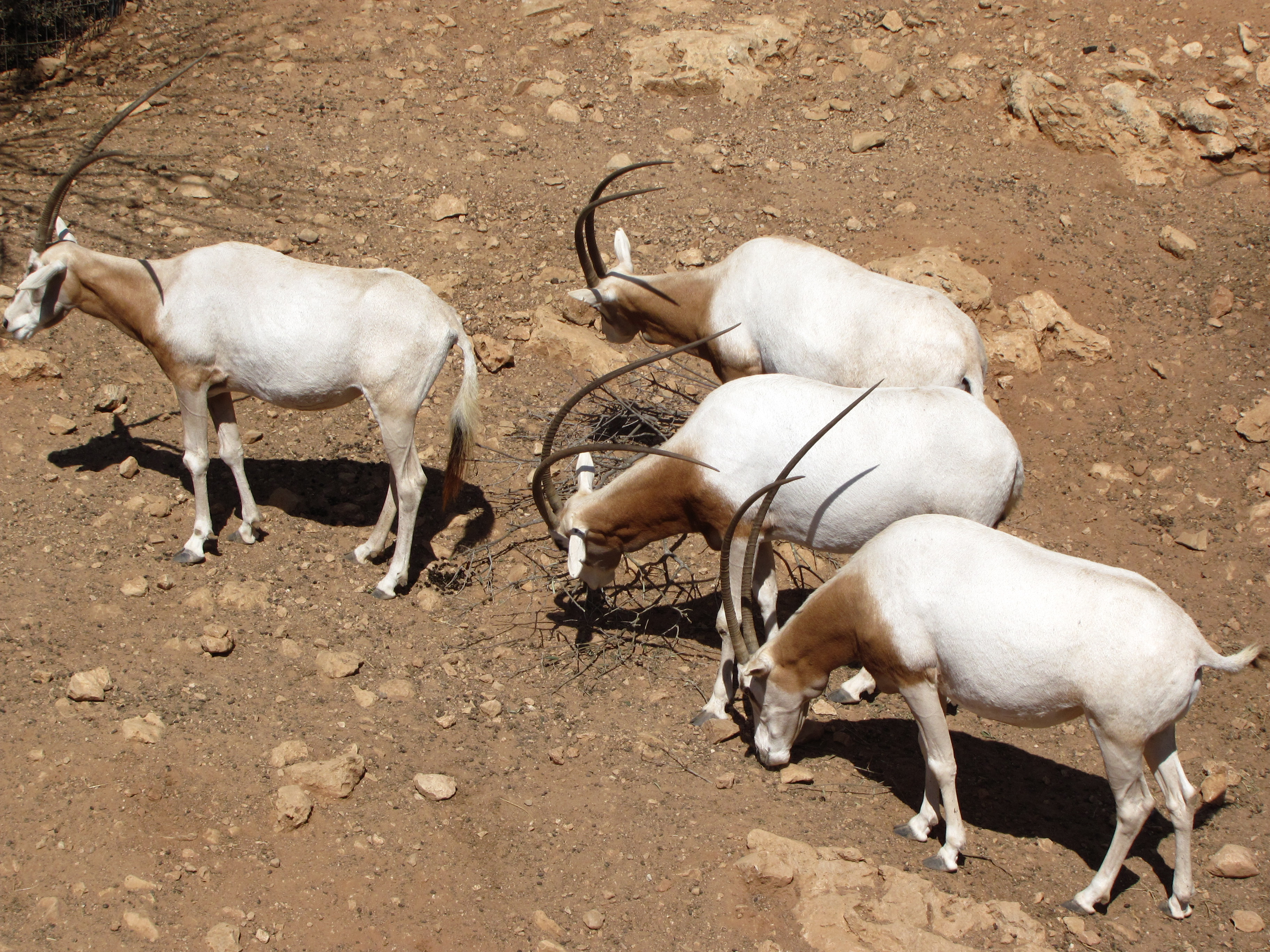
Scimitar-horned oryx roam in an open reserve

Animals and birds reside in natural habitats, from an African savannah to a tropical rain forest to the underground world of mice and cockroaches. The lesser kestrel exhibit is designed as a house in Jerusalem's Morasha district, formerly a major nesting ground for these birds. Each animal or bird which is mentioned in the Bible has a biblical verse in Hebrew, Arabic and English appended to its information sign.

Behind the scenes, the zoo operates an animal medical center with surgery, recovery and treatment rooms, a laboratory, and a quarantine unit where incoming animals and zoo animals being sent to other zoos are tested for diseases. This medical center cares for all zoo animals except the elephants, giraffes, rhinoceroses, hippopotamus, and bison, which are treated in their own exhibits.

The parking lot accommodates 500 vehicles. The city named the street astride the zoo Derech Aharon Shulov (Aharon Shulov Way) after the zoo's founder.

=== Animal species ===
As of 2009, the zoo housed 2,200 animals representing 271 different species: 60 fish species, 68 mammal species, 28 reptile species, 11 amphibian species, and 104 bird species. Many species were introduced only in the last few years, as the collection numbered 208 species in 2007.

=== Food sources ===
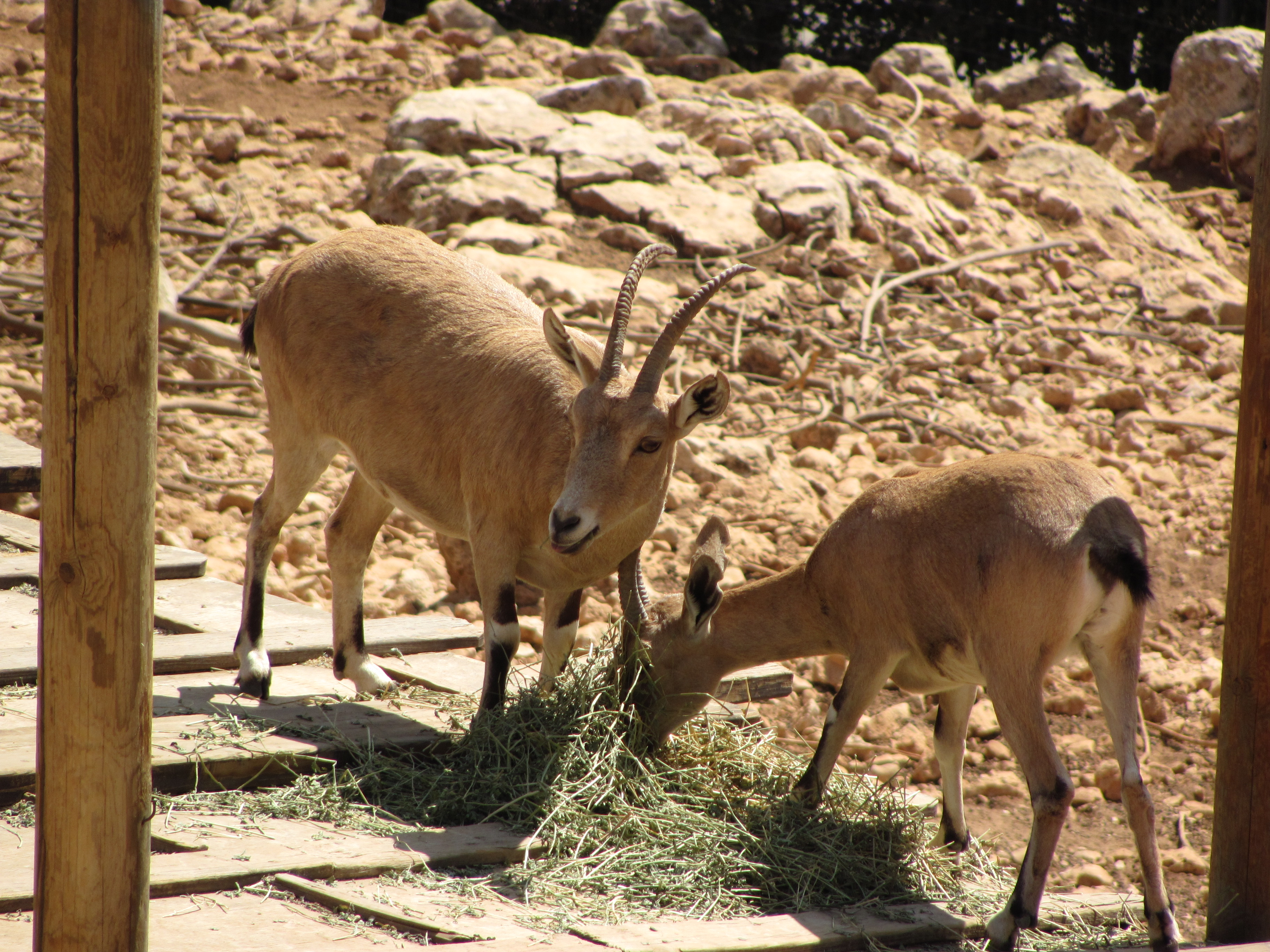
Nubian ibex at feeding time

The massive amount of fruits and vegetables consumed daily by the zoo's animals are acquired free of charge through an agreement Shulov worked out with Israeli companies that tithe their produce in accordance with Jewish law. During the days of the Temple in Jerusalem, terumah, a tithe on agricultural produce, was designated for the kohanim (priests) and their animals. After the destruction of the Temple, the rabbis decreed that the tithed produce could not be used and had to be destroyed. The animals of the Biblical Zoo were symbolically sold to a Kohen so that this tithed produce could be given to them. The animals of the Biblical Zoo receive nearly a ton of the choicest fruits and vegetables every day through a distribution handled by the local religious council. Meat consumed by the carnivores is furnished by kosher butchers, veterinarians, and fishermen. Pruned branches from edible plants in the park, such as date palms, olive trees and carob trees, are also used for fodder.

During Passover, the entire zoo is chametz-free. Four to six weeks before the holiday, the animal feed pellets are switched from wheat-based to rice-based ingredients, and after Passover they are gradually switched back to wheat-based.

== Themes and focus ==
=== Wildlife conservation ===
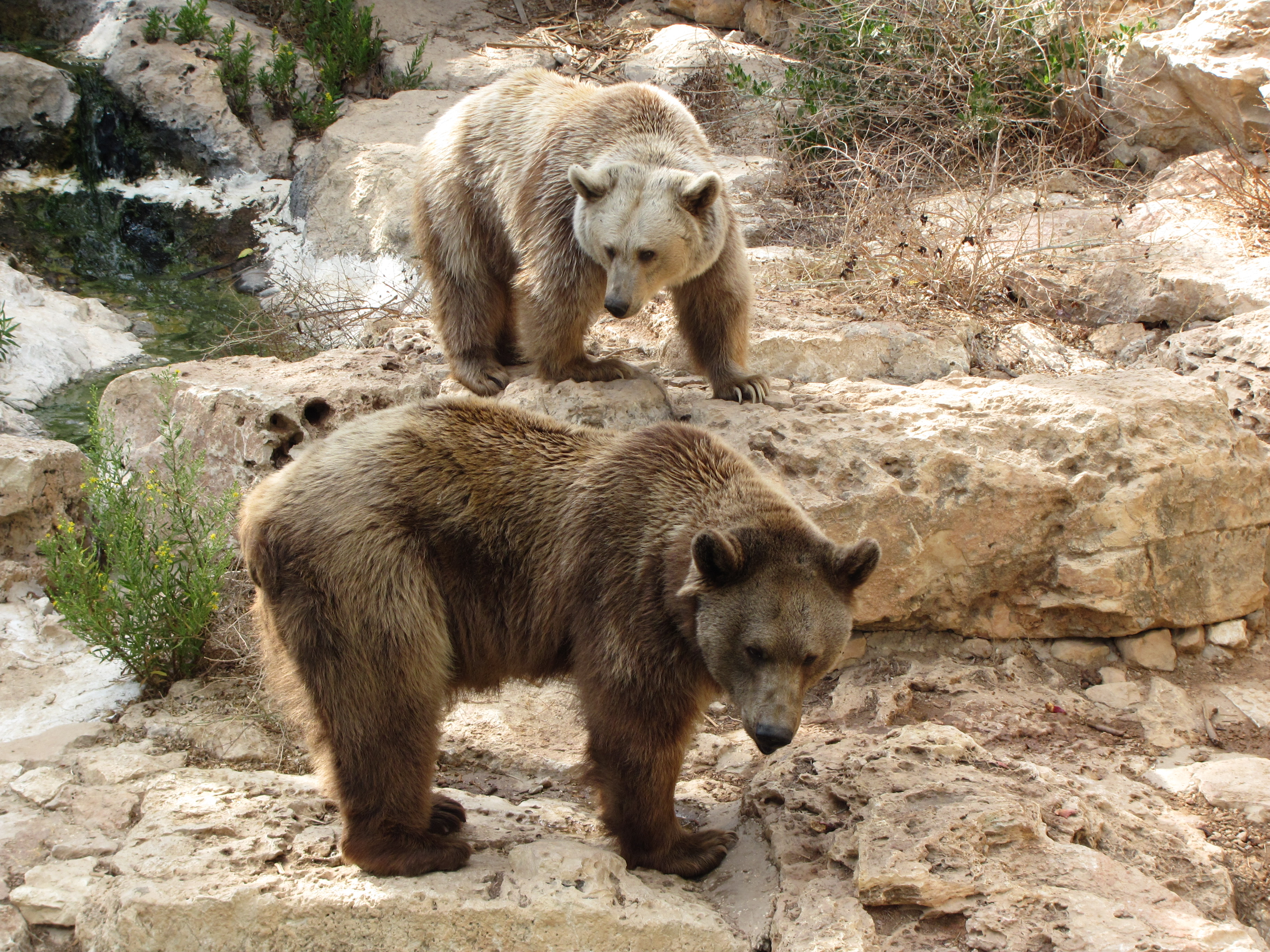
Syrian brown bears at the zoo

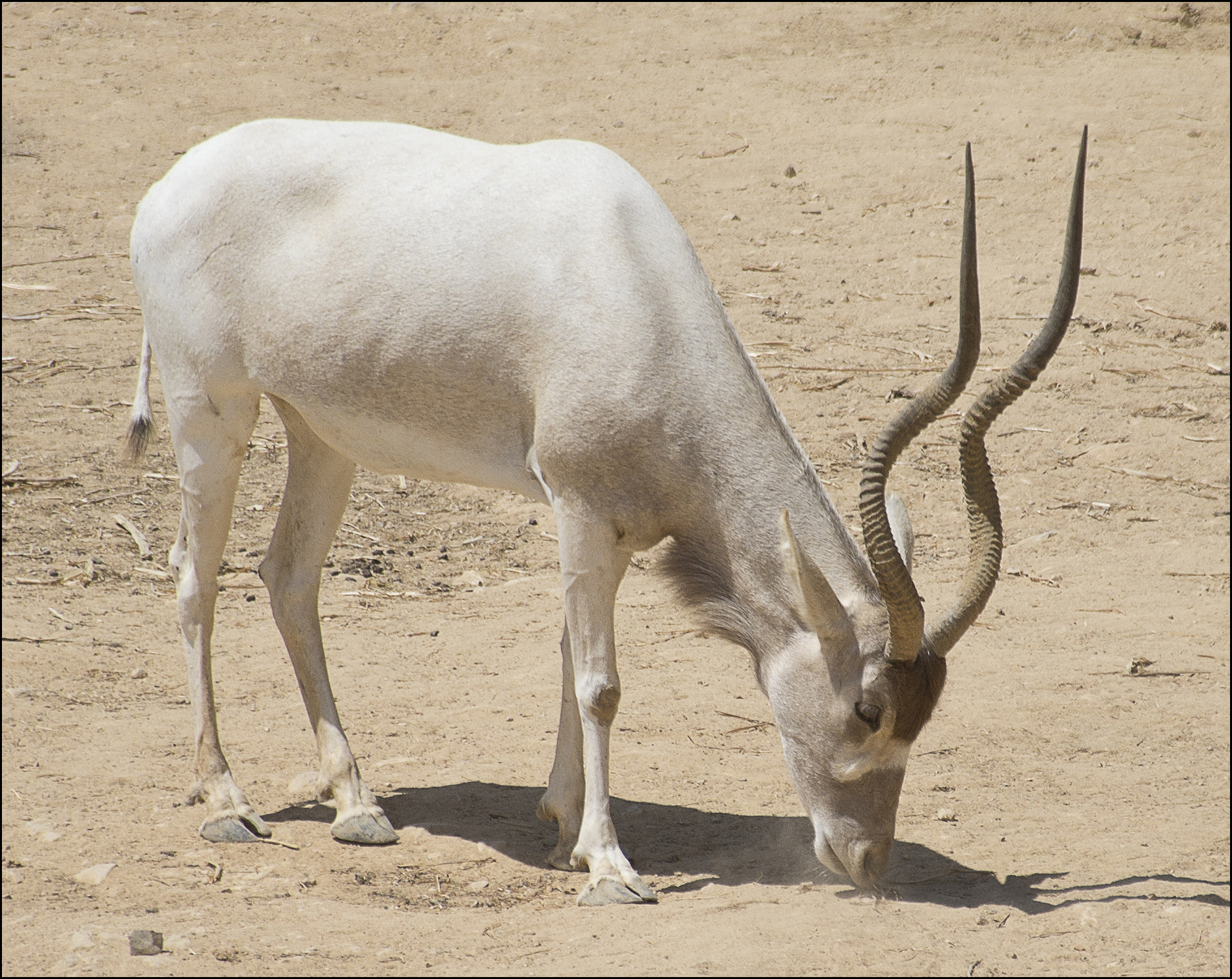
Addax in the African Yard of the zoo

The zoo sees its primary goal as the conservation of endangered species. These include animals mentioned in the Bible which are now extinct in Israel, such as Asiatic lions, Syrian brown bears, Asiatic cheetahs, Nile crocodiles and Persian fallow deer (which has since been reintroduced to Israel), and Arabian leopards, which are critically endangered and on the verge of extinction in Israel. It also includes endangered species worldwide, such as Asian elephants (which historically also lived in the Levant), rare species of macaw, cockatiels, ibises, and golden lion tamarins.

Towards that end, the zoo undertakes to breed animals in captivity and, in some cases, reintroduce them to the wild. Through this program, the zoo has successfully increased the number of Persian fallow deer in Israel. This species was thought to be extinct in the 20th century until a small number of deer were located in Iran in 1956. In 1978, four of these deer were brought to Israel and have since increased to several hundred, with a major breeding colony at the Jerusalem Biblical Zoo. A concurrent project to protect the Negev tortoise from extinction involves breeding from artificially-incubated eggs.

There is a captive breeding programme for the blind cave shrimp Typhlocaris galilea.

At the zoo's National Center for Artificial Incubation of Raptor Eggs, eggs of raptors that are either extinct or severely decimated in Israel are incubated from captive-breeding pairs. The griffon vulture, an endangered species, is the subject of much research activity. The zoo has successfully mated vultures with crippled wings – a feat that ornithologists previously thought could not be accomplished because these birds could not balance themselves properly. It has also used two male vultures to hatch and raise chicks from incubated eggs. Additionally, the zoo participates in a countrywide breeding program coordinated by the Israel Nature and Parks Authority to increase the birth rate of griffon vultures in the wild.

The zoo conducts a small ceremony each time it returns a bird to the wild. In 1996, for the release of a griffon vulture which it named "Freedom", the zoo invited the mother of captured Israeli navigator Ron Arad to help release the bird.

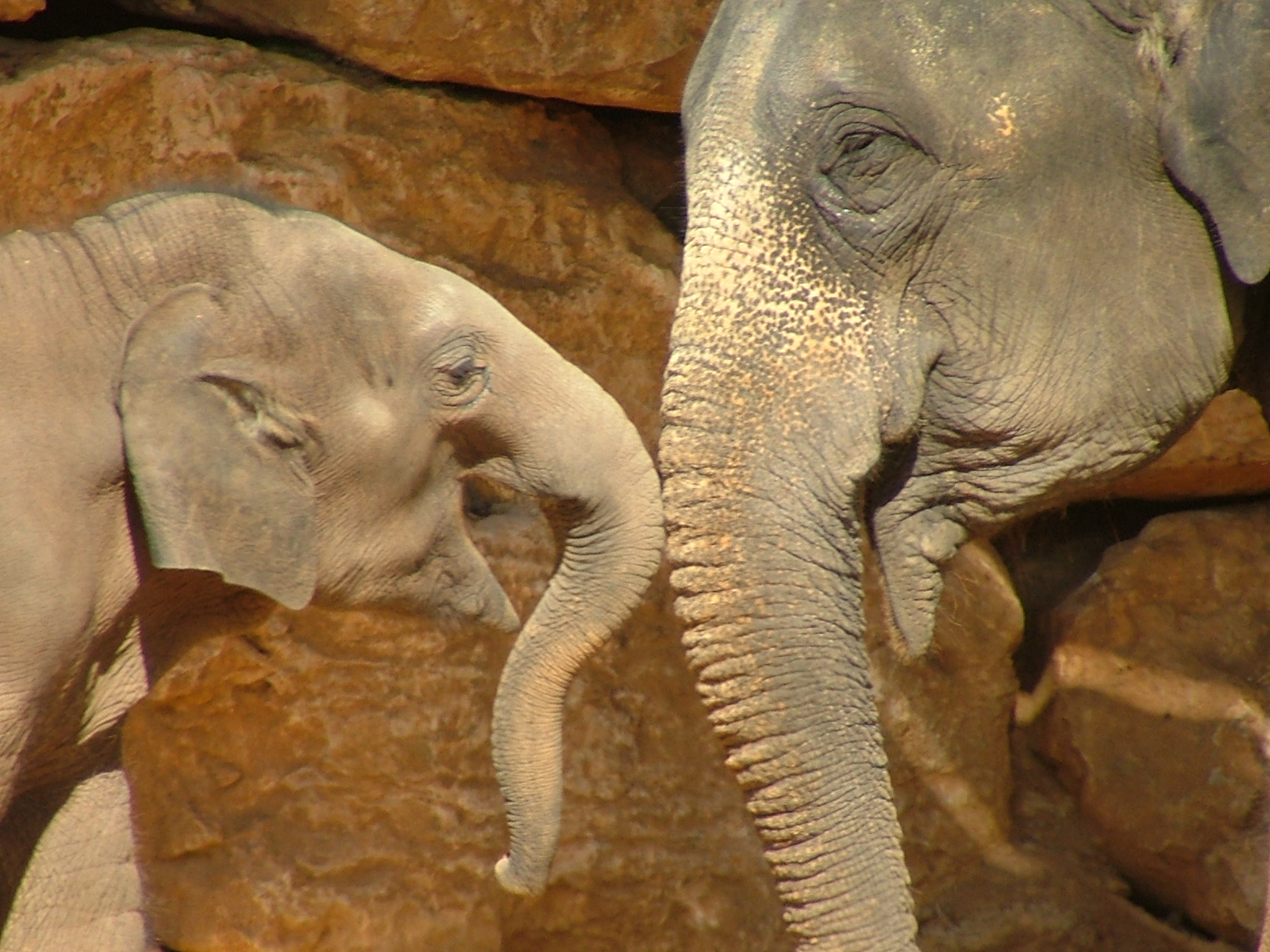
The year-old Gabi (left) with his mother Tamar in the elephant enclosure, January 2007

The zoo is considered a world leader and educator in reproductive intervention. It achieved a major success in December 2005 with the birth of Gabi, the first elephant conceived in Israel through artificial insemination. In conjunction with a team from the Reproduction Management Institute for Zoo Biology and Wildlife Research of Berlin, zoo veterinarians impregnated one of their female elephants, Tamar, with sperm obtained from Emmett, a bull elephant in the Whipsnade Animal Park, Bedfordshire, England. On 10 December 2005, Gabi's six-hour birth was viewed by over 350,000 people in 108 countries via live streaming on the zoo's website.

The zoo has also pioneered the use of animal birth control. It was the first to use a dart gun to implant a slow-release hormone into the thigh of a female giraffe; she is the daughter of the zoo's bull giraffe, and inbreeding is inadvisable. The zoo uses slow-release hormones to control its chimpanzee and mandrill populations, which are reproducing too quickly for the space they occupy; letting the animals multiply and sending family members to other zoos is unwise, according to veterinarians.

Newborn animals that are threatened or ignored by their parents are raised by the veterinary staff. On 31 December 2008, for example, a newborn tiger cub ignored by its mother was taken home by a staff member to be bottle-fed. A newborn leopard rejected by its mother spent its days at the zoo and nights at veterinarians' homes for its first three and a half months of life.

The zoo also provides medical treatment for animals and birds injured in the wild. The wildlife is either released back to their natural environment (if they are healthy enough) or placed in other zoos. In the late 2000s, an aviary was built for eagle owls which the zoo is nursing back to health.

=== Public education ===
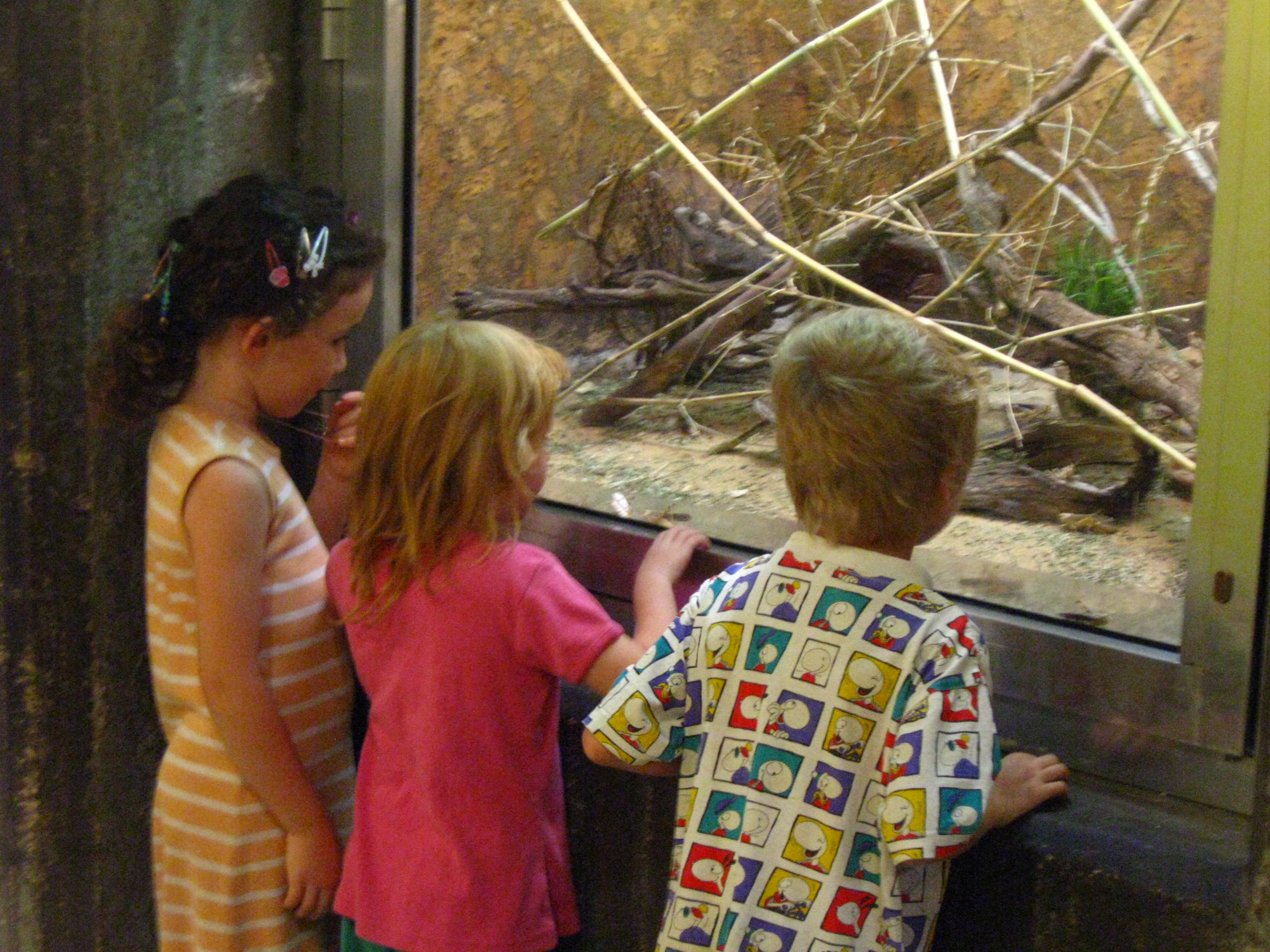
Children view a snake behind protective glass.

Public education is another prime focus of the zoo. According to Shai Doron, director-general of the zoo since 1993, "Our moral right to exist comes from educating and raising the awareness of our visitors."

Many Israelis, both Jewish and Arab, are not familiar with zoos and get "overexcited" at seeing the animals on display. Dozens of zoo personnel man the displays during peak holiday times to stop visitors from throwing food and other items at the animals. The animals do have a preference for Bamba, the popular children's peanut-and-corn snack (though it gives the monkeys diarrhea); other common projectiles include bottles, plastic bags, and children's shoes. In 1997, a toco toucan was found dead in its cage next to pieces of avocado, a known bird toxin. In 2006, a hippopotamus died after swallowing a tennis ball tossed into its enclosure. Over the past decade and a half, the zoo staff claims that public awareness has improved.

Through visiting school groups, after-school groups, special-education groups and summer camps, children learn about and interact with the animals. Educational activities for children, including the zoo's own youth movement, promote interracial encounters between Arab and Jewish youth. The zoo also mounts a traveling workshop called the Zoomobile, which brings small animals in cages and a sound system carrying the sounds of larger animals to schools, hospitals, and other locations.

=== Environmental awareness ===
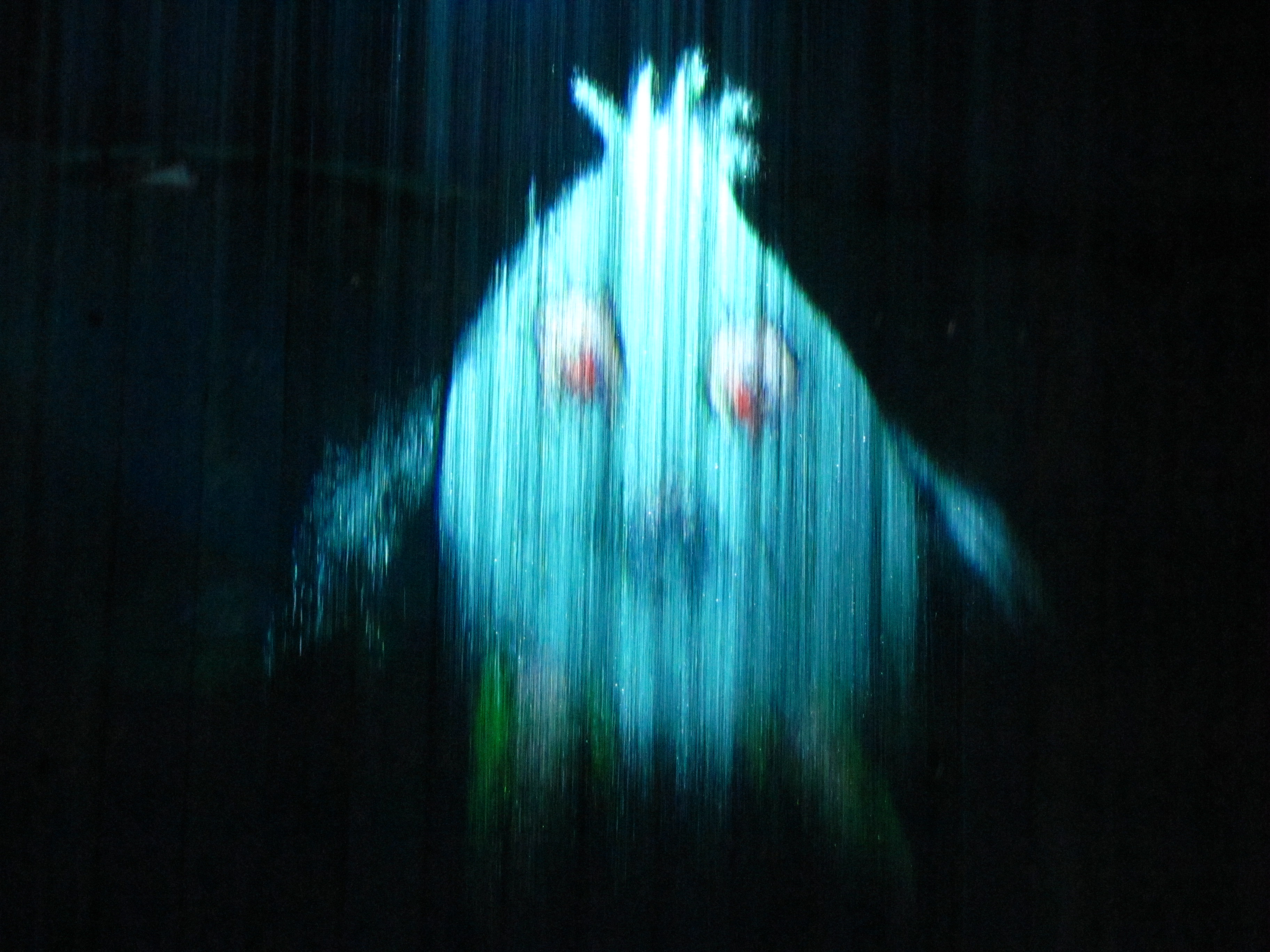
An animated water droplet projected onto a cascade of running water "talks" to visitors at the Wet Side Story aquatic exhibit.

The zoo teaches environmentalism both in its exhibits and by personal example. Since 1997, it has featured an "ecological maze" – a short path meandering through high bushes with signs that highlight ecological challenges in Israel. In spring 2010 it unveiled a $1.5 million aquatic exhibit called "Wet Side Story" which stresses the importance of water conservation, ecology awareness, and water challenges in the Middle East and around the world. This exhibit displays rare and endangered marine life in 17 large aquariums and three huge water tanks measuring 2 × 4 metres (7 × 14 ft). There is also an outdoor "petting pool" where visitors can touch and feed koi.

In keeping with its "green" policy, the zoo maintains its own sewage treatment system and uses recycled water to irrigate its gardens. Food and animal waste are mixed with plant material and placed in large compost piles; the compost is used to fertilize the trees and shrubs. The zoo sells its organic compost in the gift shop. In 2006, receptacles for collecting used plastic drink bottles were installed next to each of the snack bars, and used batteries are collected at the gift shop. To reduce carbon emissions and traffic, the zoo schedules the use of delivery and security vehicles.

== Research ==
The Jerusalem Biblical Zoo participates in national and international research projects in the fields of zoology, biology, and environmental science, and publishes papers in journals and at scientific meetings. Through its Aharon Shulov Fund for the Study of Animals in Captivity, it also provides grants for research on animal welfare and husbandry, animal reintroduction, reproduction of endangered species, conservation genetics, and exotic animal nutrition and medical care. The Fund is sponsored by Shulov's family, the Friends of the Zoo Association, and the Jerusalem Zoo.

The zoo hosts academic seminars and student research at the Gabi Center, located in a 2.0-square-metre (21 sq ft) facility inside the main entrance. The center was named in memory of Dr. Gabi Eshkar, deputy director-general and chief veterinarian of the zoo for over 17 years, who was killed in an automobile accident in 2004.

=== Affiliations ===
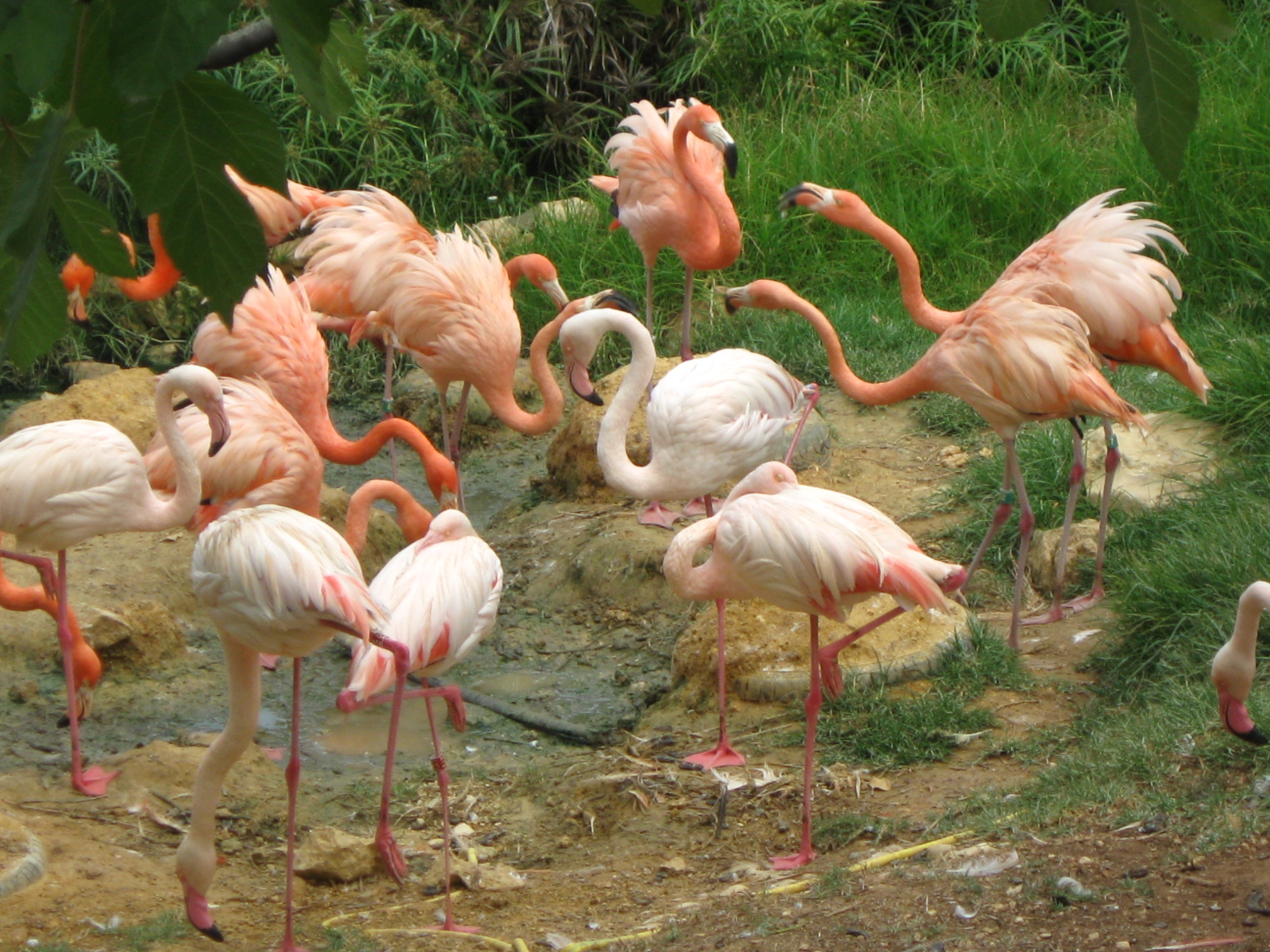
Flamingos at the zoo

The Jerusalem Biblical Zoo is a full member of the European Association of Zoos and Aquaria (EAZA). Zoo director-general Shai Doron is the only EAZA Council Member from Israel in the 2009–2012 season, while general curator Shmulik Yedvab has been EAZA's European Endangered Species Programme project coordinator for the white-tailed sea eagle population of Europe and Asia since 1995. The zoo is also a member of the World Association of Zoos and Aquariums (WAZA), the Israel Zoo Association (which it helped form), and the International Species Information System (ISIS).

Members of the veterinary staff belong to the American Association of Zoo Veterinarians, the European Association of Zoo and Wildlife Veterinarians, and the European Group on Zoo Animal Contraception.

== Visitors and volunteers ==
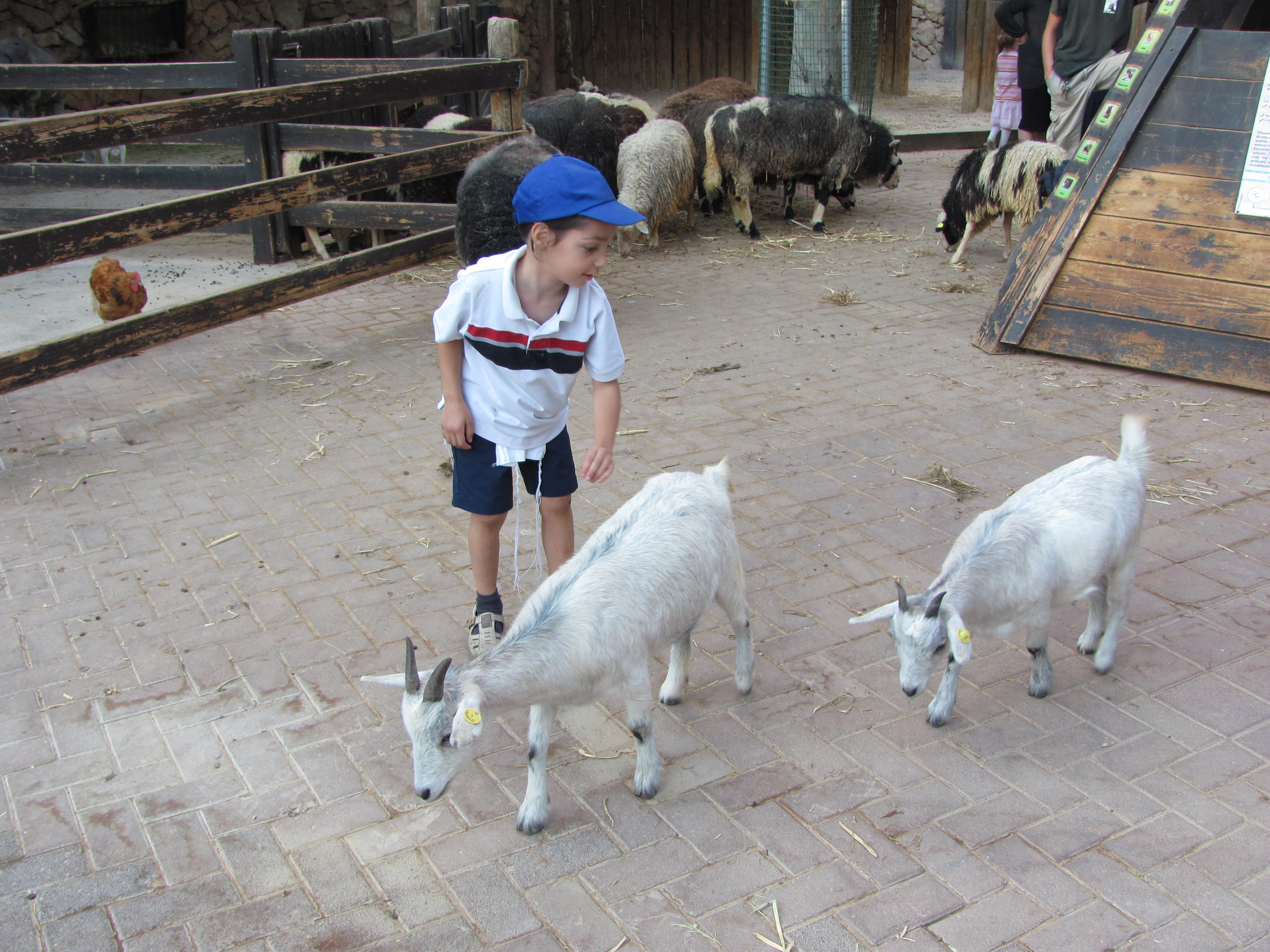
A boy tries to pet the goats at the children's petting zoo.

A record 738,000 people visited the zoo in 2009. The zoo does a brisk business in tourist groups, school groups, and summer camps: over 120,000 visitors arrived in groups in 2009. Included in the total are 63 groups of special-needs children, both Jewish and Arab, who participate in weekly sessions of animal-assisted therapy. Total capacity in the park is 11,000 visitors.

Over 50 volunteers assist zoo operations on a weekly basis. The zoo's youth movement, called Tnuat Noach (Hebrew: תנועת נח, "Noah's Movement"), involves teens aged 13–15 as volunteers in the children's zoo, small animal building, and bird and herbivores sections. Members meet weekly with zoo staff and participate in hikes and expeditions in nature reserves.

In March 2013 a Zoo Guide application for iPhone and iPad was released, which includes GPS navigation within the zoo, detailed information (written, pictorial and audio) about the animals, and a detailed daily schedule of feedings and events.

=== Special events ===
The zoo, which is open every day of the year except Yom Kippur, Yom HaShoah, and Yom HaZikaron, schedules special activities on selected dates. Tree-planting activities are an annual Tu Bishvat tradition. On both days of Purim there is a parade, a family costume competition, and a tug of war between the entire Hapoel Jerusalem Basketball Team and one of the elephants (the elephant always wins). On Israel's Election Day, zoo goers are encouraged to vote for their favorite animal. During the summer, the zoo conducts tours of nocturnal animals in the wee hours of the night. It also schedules jazz concerts, juggling, and workshops during school vacations.

== Expansion plans ==
The master plan for expansion is drafted by the zoo's main planning body, the International Zoological Committee, which is staffed by professionals in wildlife conservation, zoo management, education, tourism and economics. This committee convened in 1993, before the reopening of the zoo, and again in 1996, when it drafted plans for adding additional animal exhibits and visitor attractions by 2010.

New plans have been drawn up for an educational center and an exhibit called Yemei Bereishit (In the Days of Genesis) which replicates Biblical conditions and excludes all modern devices, including cell phones. The $30 million project will be paid for by private donations.

== Incidents ==
- August 1, 2025- Uriel Nuri, head of the carnivores team, was attacked and killed by a Persian leopard that escaped its enclosure. Paramedics found him unconscious with severe neck and upper body injuries. Nuri died in the hospital from his injuries.
