= British University in Egypt =

Private university in Egypt

Coordinates: 30°7′4″N 31°36′23″E

The British University in Egypt
- الجامعة البريطانية فى مصر
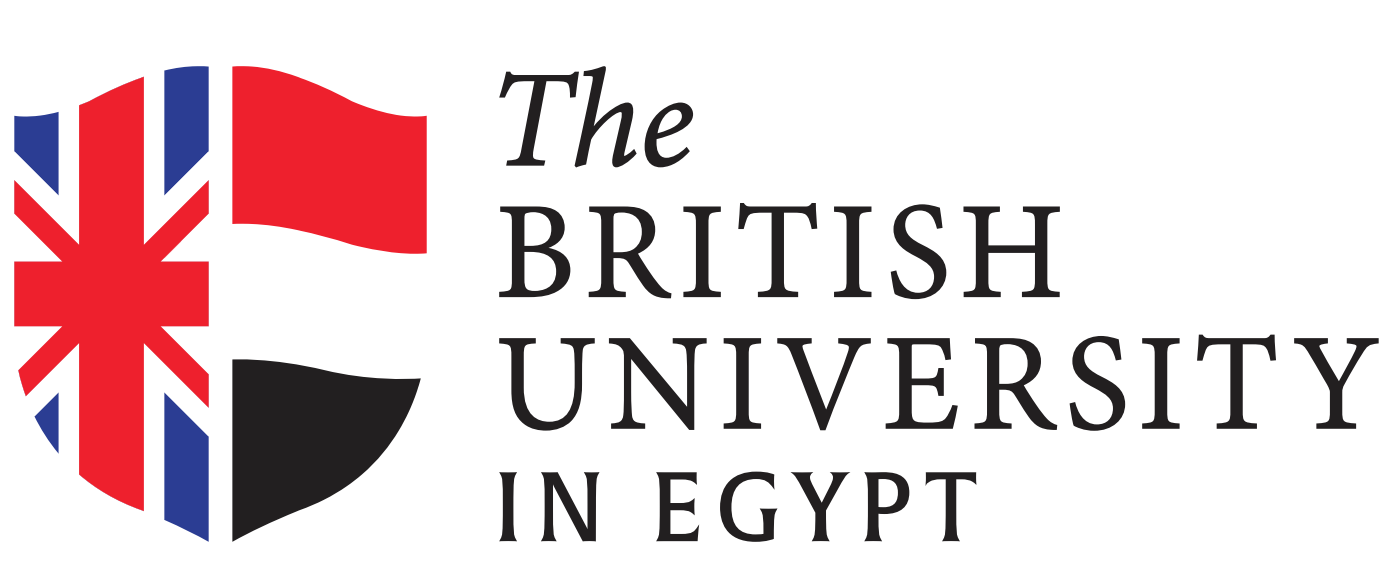
- Other name: BUE
- Motto: "Learn How to Think not What to Think"
- Type: Private
- Established: September 2005
- Chancellor: Sir Magdi Yacoub (Honorary)
- President: Mohamed Loutfi
- Vice-president: Yehia Bahei El-Din
- Students: 10,921
- Location: Cairo, Egypt
- Campus: El Sherouk
- Language: English
- Colours: Apricot; White; Blond
- Website: bue.edu.eg

University rankings

Global – Overall
- QS World: 1201–1400 (2024)
- THE World: 1201–1500 (2024)

The British University in Egypt (BUE; Arabic: الجامعة البريطانية فى مصر, romanized: Al-Jāmi‘a al-Bāritāneya fe-Mīsr) is a private university in El Shorouk City, Cairo, Egypt. Its goal is to provide education in Egypt meeting UK university standards. The university was founded in 2004 by presidential decree, admitting its first students in 2005. It awards degrees validated by its partner universities in the UK and the Egyptian Supreme Council of Universities.

The British University in Egypt is the only university in Egypt and North Africa accredited by the UK Quality Assurance Agency for Higher Education (QAA). According to the Center for World University Rankings (CWUR), in 2021 the BUE was ranked as the 9th best university in Egypt; in 2023, it was ranked as the top private university in Egypt by the Times Higher Education World University Rankings.

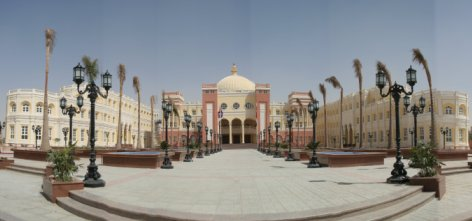
Main Campus in El-Sherouk, Cairo.

== Governance and administration ==
The British University in Egypt arose from a 1998 memorandum of cooperation between the governments of Egypt and the United Kingdom.

The Egyptian Supreme Council of Universities has officially approved the university and conducts regular quality assurance evaluations to guarantee that its academic programs that meets the council's requirements. In addition, the university has collaborations with several UK universities with the aim to guarantee that its programs are in line with common international practices.

The university holds academic partnerships with three British universities: London South Bank University, Manchester Metropolitan University and Queen Margaret University. In April 2023, the university signed a memorandum of understanding with King’s College London.

The university is managed by a Board of Trustees, which is in charge of deciding the university's strategic direction. Professor Mohamed Loutfi is the current university president, having assumed the position in 2021. In December 2022, Magdi Yacoub became the first honorary chancellor of the university.

=== Presidents ===
- Mohamed Loutfi (2021–present)
- Ahmed Hamad (2015-2020)
- Mostafa Gouda (2013-2015)
- Ahmed Hamza (2008-2013)
- Mostafa El-Feki (2005-2008)

=== Board of trustees ===
The board of trustees of the British University in Egypt is composed of individuals from both Egypt and the United Kingdom. The board convenes biannually, with one meeting held in Egypt and the other in London, to provide oversight on the university's strategic orientation.

== Campus ==
The main university campus is located approximately 30 km (19 mi) from downtown Cairo; the campus covers about 40 acres (16 ha) of land, with approximately 27,000 m^{2} (290,000 sq ft) dedicated to purpose-built teaching facilities.

== Faculties ==
The university has the following 12 faculties:

- Faculty of Arts and Design
- Faculty of Arts and Humanities
- Faculty of Business Administration, Economics & Political Science (Accredited by the National Authority for Quality Assurance and Accreditation)
- Faculty of Dentistry (Accredited by the National Authority for Quality Assurance and Accreditation)
- Faculty of Engineering (Accredited by London South Bank University and the Engineering Quality Assurance Unit in Egypt)
- Faculty of Energy and Environmental Engineering
- Faculty of Information & Computer Science
- Faculty of Law
- Faculty of Mass Communication
- Faculty of Nursing
- Faculty of Pharmacy
- Faculty of Physiotherapy

== Programs ==
In March 2022, the Egyptian Exchange and the university signed a memorandum of cooperation for the promotion of financial literacy among students, aiming to produce a comprehensive financial campaign on saving, investment, and trading.

== Notable alumni ==
- Feryal Abdelaziz – Egyptian sportswoman
- Mihrigul Tursun – alleged Uyghur prisoner

== See also ==
- London South Bank University
- Manchester Metropolitan University
- Queen Margaret University
- British University in Dubai (BUiD)
- List of Egyptian universities
- Education in Egypt
