= Structure of the Egyptian Expeditionary Force =

Military formation

The Order of battle of the Egyptian Expeditionary Force during the First World War is shown below.

== 1916 ==
Canal Defences (General A. Murray)

No.1 Section, Headquarters Suez – IX Corps (January to March)

No.2 Section, Headquarters Ismailia – I Anzac Corps (January to March)

Imperial Service Cavalry Brigade

Jodhpur Lancers
Mysore Lancers
Hyderabad Lancers
11th Light Horse Regiment
12th Light Horse Regiment

(incomplete)

No.3 Section, Headquarters Port Said – (Major General H.A. Lawrence)

42nd (East Lancashire) Division

125th (Lancashire Fusiliers) Brigade
126th (East Lancashire) Brigade
127th (Manchester) Brigade

52nd (Lowland) Division (Major General W.E.B. Smith)

155th (South Scottish) Brigade
156th (Scottish Rifles) Brigade
157th (Highland Light Infantry) Brigade (Note: The names of the infantry divisions, brigades and battalions and some other units have, in many cases, been changed so they no longer reflect the names of these units as they appear in the sources quoted. Additional names of units have been added without citation.)

Australian and New Zealand Mounted Division (Anzac Mounted Division) (Major General Sir H.G. Chauvel)

1st Australian Light Horse Brigade

1st Light Horse Regiment
2nd Light Horse Regiment
3rd Light Horse Regiment
Leicestershire Royal Horse Artillery

2nd Australian Light Horse Brigade

5th Light Horse Regiment
6th Light Horse Regiment
7th Light Horse Regiment
Ayrshire Royal Horse Artillery

3rd Australian Light Horse Brigade

8th Light Horse Regiment
9th Light Horse Regiment
10th Light Horse Regiment
Inverness-shire Royal Horse Artillery

New Zealand Mounted Rifles Brigade (Brigadier General Edward Chaytor)

Auckland Mounted Rifles Regiment (Lieutenant Colonel Charles Mackesy)
Canterbury Mounted Rifles Regiment (Lieutenant Colonel John Findlay)
Wellington Mounted Rifles Regiment (Lieutenant Colonel William Meldrum)
Somerset Royal Horse Artillery

5th Mounted Brigade (Brigadier General E. A. Wiggin)

Royal Gloucestershire Hussars
Warwickshire Yeomanry
Worcestershire Yeomanry

Imperial Camel Corps Brigade (Brigadier General C. L. Smith VC)

1st (Australian) Battalion
2nd (British) Battalion
3rd (Australian) Battalion
4th (ANZAC) Battalion

No. 1 Squadron, Australian Flying Corps (Lieutenant Colonel E. H. Reynold)

A Flight (Captain W. Sheldon – four machines later expanded to six)
B Flight (Lieutenant Manwell – four machines later expanded to six)
C Flight (Captain Williams – four machines later expanded to six)

Until almost the end of 1917, No. l Squadron, A.F.C., and No. 14 Squadron, R.F.C., were the sole flying units east of the Suez Canal.

=== General organisation in April 1916 ===
General Headquarters

General Headquarters Troops
No. 1 Section (IX Corps)
No. 2 Section (II ANZAC)
No. 3 Section (Anzac Mounted Division)
Western Frontier Force

Northwestern Section
Southwestern Section

L. of C. Defence Troops
Inspector-General of Communications

Alexandria District
Cyprus Garrison
Lines of Communication Units

=== Order of battle April ===
General Headquarters

- Commander in Chief – Lieutenant General (temp. General) A. J. Murray
- Chief of General Staff – Major General A. L. Lynden-Bell

Headquarters of Administrative services and departments Army Signals, Work, Supplies and Transport, Railways, Ordnance, Remounts, Veterinary Services, Medical Services, Army Postal Services, Paymaster Inspector General of Communication and Levant Base

Anzac Mounted Division GOC Colonel (temp. Major General) H.G. Chauvel

1st Light Horse Brigade (Western Force) GOC Lieutenant Colonel C. F. Cox (acting)

1st Light Horse Regiment
2nd Light Horse Regiment
3rd Light Horse Regiment
4th Light Horse Regiment (attached)

2nd Light Horse Brigade GOC Colonel (temp. Brigadier General G. de L. Ryrie)

5th Light Horse Regiment
6th Light Horse Regiment
7th Light Horse Regiment
12th Light Horse Regiment (attached)

3rd Light Horse Brigade GOC Brevet Lieutenant Colonel (temp. Brigadier General) J. M Antill

8th Light Horse Regiment
9th Light Horse Regiment
10th Light Horse Regiment
11th Light Horse Regiment (attached)

New Zealand Mounted Rifles Brigade GOC Brigadier General E. W. C. Chaytor)

Auckland Mounted Rifle Regiment
Canterbury Mounted Rifle Regiment
Wellington Mounted Rifle Regiment
Otago Mounted Rifles Regiment (attached)

Divisional Troops

Artillery

III Brigade, Royal Horse Artillery (T.F.) Leicestershire and Somerset Batteries
IV Brigade, Royal Horse Artillery (T.F.) Inverness-shire and Ayrshire Batteries

Engineers

1st Australian Field Squadron

Signal Service

1st Anzac Signal Squadron

Army Service Corps (ASC)

HQ, Light Horse Divisional ASC
Light Horse Supply Column (M.T.)

Medical Units

1st, 2nd and 3rd Light Horse Field Ambulances
NZ Mounted Brigade Ambulance

IX Corps GOC Major General (temp. Lieutenant General) F. J. Davies

Corps Troops

Mounted Troops
8th Mounted Brigade

1/1st City of London Yeomanry
1/1st County of London Yeomanry
1/3rd County of London Yeomanry
1/1st London Signal Troop

"B" Battery, Honourable Artillery Company (H.A.C.)
No. 9 Field Troop
1/1st London Mounted Brigade Field Ambulance

Signal Service

HH and KK Cable Section
London Pack Wireless Section
Northern Wagon Wireless Section

42nd (East Lancashire) Division GOC Major General W. Douglas

125th (Lancashire Fusiliers) Brigade GOC Colonel (temp. Brigadier General) H. C. Frith

1/5th Lancashire Fusiliers
1/6th Lancashire Fusiliers
1/7th Lancashire Fusiliers
1/8th Lancashire Fusiliers
125th Brigade Machine Gun Company

126th (East Lancashire) Brigade GOC Major (temp. Brigadier General) A. W. Tufnell

1/4th East Lancashire Regiment
1/5th East Lancashire Regiment
1/9th Manchester Regiment
1/10th Manchester Regiment
126th Brigade Machine Gun Company

127th (Manchester) Brigade GOC Lieutenant Colonel (temp. Brigadier General) V. A. Ormsby

1/5th Manchester Regiment
1/6th Manchester Regiment
1/7th Manchester Regiment
1/8th Manchester Regiment
127th Brigade Machine Gun Company

Divisional Troops

Mounted Troops

1 Squadron Duke of Lancaster's Own Yeomanry
13th Cyclist Company

Artillery

1/1st East Lancashire Brigade RFA
1/2nd East Lancashire Brigade RFA
1/3rd East Lancashire Brigade RFA
1/4th East Lancashire (Howitzer) Brigade RFA
42nd Divisional Ammunition Column

Engineers

1/1st East Lancashire Field Company RE
1/2nd East Lancashire Field Company RE
1/2nd West Lancashire Field Company RE

Signal Service

42nd Divisional Signal Company

ASC

42nd Divisional Train

Medical Units

1/1st, 1/2nd and 1/3rd East Lancashire Field Ambulances

3rd Dismounted Brigade (attached) GOC Lieutenant Colonel Lord Kensington (Acting)

1/1st Royal East Kent Yeomanry
1/1st Queen's Own West Kent Yeomanry
1/1st Sussex Yeomanry
1/1st Welsh Horse
1/1st Norfolk Yeomanry
1/1st Suffolk Yeomanry
Machine Gun Company
3rd Dismounted Brigade Signal Troop
1/1st Eastern and 1/1st South Eastern Mounted Brigade Field Ambulances

54th (East Anglian) Division GOC Colonel (temp. Major General) S. W. Hare

161st (Essex) Brigade

1/4th Essex Regiment
1/5th Essex Regiment
1/6th Essex Regiment
1/7th Essex Regiment
161st Machine Gun Company

162nd (East Midland) Brigade

1/5th Bedfordshire Regiment
1/4th Northamptonshire Regiment
1/10th London Regiment
1/11th London Regiment
162nd Machine Gun Company

163rd (Norfolk and Suffolk) Brigade

1/4th Norfolk Regiment
1/5th Norfolk Regiment
1/8th Hampshire Regiment
163rd Machine Gun Company

Divisional Troops

Mounted Troops

1 Squadron 1/1st Hertfordshire Yeomanry (with HQ and Machine Gun Section)

Artillery

1/1st East Anglian Brigade RFA
1/2nd East Anglian Brigade RFA
1/3rd East Anglian Brigade RFA
1/4th East Anglian Brigade RFA
54th Divisional Ammunition Column (one officer and 35 other ranks)

Engineers

2/1st East Anglian Field Company RE
1/2nd East Anglian Field Company RE
1/1st Kent Field Company RE

Signal Service

54th Divisional Signal Company

ASC

54th Divisional Train (Supply details only)

Medical Units

2/1st, 1/2nd and 1/3rd East Anglian Field Ambulances

20th Indian Brigade (attached) GOC Brigadier General H. D. Watson

2/3rd Gurkhas
58th Rifles
Alwar Infantry (I.S.)
Gwalior Infantry (I.S.)

29th Indian Brigade GOC Colonel (temp. Brigadier General) P. C. Palin

23rd Pioneers
57th Rifles
Patiala Infantry (I.S.)
No. 10 Co. King's Own Sappers and Miners
110, 121, 135 Indian Field Ambulances
7th and 26th Mule Corps

II Australian and New Zealand Army Corps (II ANZAC) GOC Major General (temp. Lieutenant General) A. J. Godley

Corps Troops

Signal Service

No. 24 Airline Section
FF and NN Cable Sections
1st Australian Ammunition Park
1st Australian Supply Column
Royal Australian Navy Bridging Train
14th Fortress Company RE

4th Australian Division GOC Major General H. V. Cox

4th Australian Infantry Brigade

GOC Colonel (temp. Brigadier General) J. Monash

13th Battalion
14th Battalion
15th Battalion
16th Battalion
4th Machine Gun Company

12th Australian Infantry Brigade

45th Battalion
46th Battalion
47th Battalion
48th Battalion
12th Machine Gun Company

13th Australian Infantry Brigade

49th Battalion
50th Battalion
51st Battalion
52nd Battalion
13th Machine Gun Company

Divisional Troops

Mounted Troops

"B" Squadron 13th Light Horse Regiment
4th Divisional Cyclist Company

Artillery

X Field Artillery Brigade
XI Field Artillery Brigade
XII Field Artillery Brigade
XXIV Howitzer Brigade
4th Divisional Ammunition Column

Engineers

4th Field Company
12th Field Company
13th Field Company

Signal Service

4th Divisional Signal Company

Pioneers

4th Pioneer Battalion

ASC

7th, 14th, 26th and 27th Coys, AASC

Medical Units

4th, 12th, 13th Field Ambulances

5th Australian Division GOC Colonel (temp Major General) J. W. McCay

8th Australian Infantry Brigade

29th Battalion
30th Battalion
31st Battalion
32nd Battalion
8th Machine Gun Company

14th Australian Infantry Brigade

53rd Battalion
54th Battalion
55th Battalion
56th Battalion
14th Machine Gun Company

15th Australian Infantry Brigade

57th Battalion
58th Battalion
59th Battalion
60th Battalion
15th Machine Gun Company

Divisional Troops

Mounted Troops

"C" Squadron 13th Light Horse Regiment
5th Divisional Cyclist Company

Artillery

XIII Field Artillery Brigade
XIV Field Artillery Brigade
XV Field Artillery Brigade
XXV Howitzer Brigade
5th Divisional Ammunition Column

Engineers

8th Field Company
14th Field Company
15th Field Company

Signal Service

5th Divisional Signal Company

Pioneers

5th Pioneer Battalion

ASC

10th, 18th, 28th and 29th Coys, AASC

Medical Units

8th, 14th, 15th Field Ambulances

11th (Northern) Division GOC Major General E. A. Fanshawe

32nd Brigade

9th West Yorkshire Regiment
6th Yorkshire Regiment
8th West Riding Regiment
6th York and Lancaster Regiment
32nd Brigade Machine Gun Company

33rd Brigade

6th Lincolnshire Regiment
6th Border Regiment
7th South Staffordshire Regiment
9th Sherwood Foresters
33rd Brigade Machine Gun Company

34th Brigade

8th Northumberland Fusiliers
9th Lancashire Fusiliers
5th Dorsetshire Regiment

11th Manchester Regiment

34th Brigade Machine Gun Company

Divisional Troops

Mounted Troops

1 Squadron 1/1st Hertfordshire Yeomanry
11th Cyclist Company

Artillery

LVIII Brigade RFA
LIX Brigade RFA
LX Brigade RFA
CXXXIII Brigade RFA

Engineers

67th Field Company RE
68th Field Company RE
86th Field Company RE

Signal Service

11th Divisional Signal Company

Pioneers

6th East Yorkshire Regiment

ASC

11th Divisional Train (Supply details only)

Medical Units

33rd, 34th, 35th Field Ambulances

No. 3 Section Canal Defences GOC etc Headquarters 52nd Division

Corps Troops

Mounted Troops
5th Mounted Brigade

1/1st Warwick Yeomanry
1/1st Gloucester Yeomanry
1/1st Worcester Yeomanry
1/1st South Midland Signal Troop

"A" Battery, H.A.C.
No. 7 Field Troop
1/1st South Midland Mounted Brigade Field Ambulance

Engineers

220th Army Troops Company RE

Signal Service

No. 21 Airline Section
WW Cable Section

52nd (Lowland) Division GOC Major General H. A. Lawrence

155th (South Scottish) Brigade

1/4th Royal Scots Fusiliers
1/5th Royal Scots Fusiliers
1/4th King's Own Scottish Borderers
1/5th King's Own Scottish Borderers
155th Brigade Machine Gun Company

156th (Scottish Rifles) Brigade

1/4th (Queen's Edinburgh Rifles) Royal Scots
1/7th Royal Scots
1/7th Scottish Rifles
1/8th Scottish Rifles
156th Brigade Machine Gun Company

157th (Highland Light Infantry) Brigade

1/5th Highland Light Infantry
1/6th Highland Light Infantry
1/7th (Blythswood) Bn, Highland Light Infantry
1/5th Argyll and Sutherland Highlanders
157th Brigade Machine Gun Company

Divisional Troops

Mounted Troops

HQ and "C" Squadron Royal Glasgow Yeomanry
52nd Cyclist Company

Artillery

1/2nd Lowland Brigade RFA
1/3rd Lowland Brigade RFA
1/4th Lowland Brigade RFA
1/5th Lowland Brigade RFA
52nd Divisional Ammunition Column (one officer and 35 other ranks)

Engineers

2/1st Lowland Field Company RE
2/2nd Lowland Field Company RE
1/2nd Lowland Field Company RE

Signal Service

52nd Divisional Signal Company

ASC

52nd Divisional Train

Medical Units

1/1st, 1/2nd and 1/3rd Lowland Field Ambulances

1st Dismounted Brigade (attached) GOC Temp Brigadier General Marquess of Tullibardine

1/1st Scottish Horse
1/2nd Scottish Horse
1/3rd Scottish Horse
1/1st Ayr Yeomanry
1/1st Lanark Yeomanry
Machine Gun Company
1st Dismounted Brigade Signal Troop
1/1st Scottish and 1/1st Lowland Mounted Brigade Field Ambulances

Western Frontier Force GOC Major General W. E. Peyton

Force Troops

Mounted Troops
6th Mounted Brigade

1/1st Buckinghamshire Yeomanry
1/1st Berkshire Yeomanry
1/1st Dorsetshire Yeomanry
1/2nd South Midland Field Troop Signal [sic]

No. 6 Field Troop
1/2nd South Midland Mounted Brigade Field Ambulance

1/2nd County of London Yeomanry (attached)
Royal Flying Corps

No. 17 Squadron

Artillery

1/1st Berkshire Battery RHA
1/1st Nottinghamshire Battery RHA

Infantry

1st Battalion British West Indies Regiment
2nd Battalion British West Indies Regiment
3rd Battalion British West Indies Regiment

Signal Service

2nd Mounted Divisional Signal Squadron
No. 42 Airline Section
UU Cable Section
No. 6 Pack Wireless Section

North Western Section GOC etc Headquarters 53rd Division

53rd (Welsh) Division GOC Colonel (temp. Major General) A. G. Dallas

158th (North Wales) Brigade

1/5th Royal Welch Fusiliers
1/6th Royal Welch Fusiliers
1/7th Royal Welch Fusiliers
1/1st Herefordshire Regiment
158th Brigade Machine Gun Company

159th (Cheshire) Brigade

1/4th Cheshire Regiment
1/7th Cheshire Regiment
1/4th Welch Regiment
1/5th Welch Regiment
159th Brigade Machine Gun Company

160th (Welsh Border) Brigade

1/4th Royal Sussex Regiment
2/4th Royal West Surrey Regiment
2/4th Royal West Kent Regiment
2/10th Middlesex Regiment
160th Brigade Machine Gun Company

Divisional Troops

Mounted Troops

1 Squadron 1/1st Hertfordshire Yeomanry
53rd Divisional Cyclist Company

Artillery

1/1st Cheshire Brigade RFA
1/1st Welsh Brigade RFA
1/2nd Welsh Brigade RFA
1/4th Welsh Brigade RFA
53rd Divisional Ammunition Column (one officer and 35 other ranks)

Engineers

1/1st Welsh Field Company RE
2/1st Welsh Field Company RE
2/1st Cheshire Field Company RE

Signal Service

53rd Divisional Signal Company

ASC

53rd Divisional Train

Medical Units

1/1st, 1/2nd and 1/3rd Welsh Field Ambulances

4th Dismounted Brigade (attached) GOC Temp Brigadier General John Stewart-Murray, Marquess of Tullibardine

1/1st Shropshire Yeomanry
1/1st Denbighshire Yeomanry
1/1st Cheshire Yeomanry
1/1st Glamorgan Yeomanry
1/1st Montgomeryshire Yeomanry
1/1st Pembrokeshire Yeomanry
Machine Gun Company
4th Dismounted Brigade Signal Troop
1/1st Welsh Border and 1/1st South Wales Mounted Brigade Field Ambulances

22nd Mounted Brigade

1/1st Lincolnshire Yeomanry
1/1st Staffordshire Yeomanry
1/1st East Riding Yeomanry
Signal Troop
Mounted Brigade, ASC
Mounted Brigade Field Ambulance

Provisional Infantry Brigade (less Headquarters)

1/6th Royal Scots
2/5th Devonshire Regiment
2/7th Middlesex Regiment
2/8th Middlesex Regiment
2nd Garrison battalion, Liverpool Regiment
2 Naval 4-inch guns
1/2nd Kent Field Company RE

17th Motor Machine Gun Battery No. 1 Armoured Train

South Western Section GOC Colonel (temp Brigadier General) H. W. Hodgson

Mounted Troops

1st Australian Light Horse Brigade (see above)
1 squadron Egyptian Army Cavalry

Infantry

2nd Garrison Battalion Cheshire Regiment
1 Company and Machine Gun Section Egyptian Army

Signal Service

Detachment 2nd Mounted Divisional Signal Squadron
Emergency Squadron, Royal Naval Armoured Car Division
H.Q. and Nos. 1, 2, 3 Light Armoured Motor Batteries
No. 2 Armoured Train

General Headquarters Troops

Mounted Troops

Imperial Camel Corps
Birkanir Camel Corps

Royal Flying Corps

5th Wing Royal Flying Corps

No. 14 Squadron RFC
No. 17 Squadron RFC (with Western Force)
2 Kite Balloon Sections (Naval)

Artillery

Heavy Artillery

XX Brigade Royal Garrison Artillery (RGA)

10th, 15th 91st Heavy Batteries RGA
1 Heavy Battery and 1 Section Heavy Battery, Royal Marine Artillery

Stokes Gun Batteries

125th, 126th, 161st, 162nd Brigade Batteries

Anti-Aircraft Artillery

Nos. 30 and 38 Anti-Aircraft Sections

Mountain Artillery

4th Highland (Mountain) Brigade RGA (Argyllshire and Ross & Cromarty Batteries)

Armoured Cars

Nos 11 and 12 Armoured Motor Batteries

Engineers

11th, 116, 276th Railway Companies RE

Signal Service

GHQ Signal Company
Nos 14 and 15 Airline Sections,
NA, NB and VV Cable Sections

Unallotted

Southern Motor, W/T Station
No. 5 Pack Wireless Section

ASC

338th, 493rd, 619th Mechanical Transport Companies ASC

Transport

Camel Transport Corps
59th, 62nd, 70th, 191st Camel Corps

Lines of Communication Defence Troops

Mounted Troops

Imperial Service Cavalry Brigade

Mysore Lancers
1st Hyderabad Lancers
Kathiwar Signal Troop
124th Indian Cavalry Field Ambulance

Infantry

1st Garrison Battalion, Essex Regiment
2nd Garrison Battalion, Royal Welch Fusiliers
1st Garrison Battalion, Devonshire Regiment
1st Garrison Battalion, Royal Scots (less two companies)
1st Garrison Battalion, Liverpool Regiment
1st Garrison Battalion, Royal Irish Regiment
19th Garrison Battalion, Rifle Brigade
20th Garrison Battalion, Rifle Brigade
21st Garrison Battalion, Rifle Brigade
22nd Garrison Battalion, Rifle Brigade
1st Garrison Battalion, Royal Warwickshire Regiment (Khartoum)

Alexandria District

Coast Defence Artillery

84th Siege Battery RGA
92nd Company RGA, Mex Battery
Ras el Tin Battery
Silsileh Battery
"Y" Battery Royal Malta Artillery

and Lines of Communications units of Infantry, Signal Service, Engineers, ASC, Medical Units, Ordnance Units, Veterinary Units and Postal Units.

=== Distribution, 27 July ===
Eastern Frontier No. 1 Section

8th Mounted Brigade
54th (East Anglian) Division (less 163rd Brigade)
20th Indian Brigade
29th Indian Brigade

No. 2 Section

3rd Light Horse Brigade
160th (Welsh Border) Brigade (53rd Division)
163rd (Norfolk and Suffolk) Brigade (54th Division)
British West Indies Brigade

No. 2a Section

42nd (East Lancashire) Division

No. 3 Section

Anzac Mounted Division
5th Mounted Brigade
52nd (Lowland) Division
158th Brigade (53rd Division)
1st Dismounted Brigade

Western Frontier

6th Mounted Brigade
22nd Mounted Brigade
Part 53rd Division
2nd Dismounted Brigade
4th Dismounted Brigade

=== No. 3 Section Canal Defences August ===
Canal Defences No. 3 Section Headquarters Kantara (included Romani) (Major General H.A. Lawrence)

Force Defending Romani on 4 August

52nd (Lowland) Division (Major General W.E.B. Smith)

155th (South Scottish) Brigade
156th (Scottish Rifles) Brigade
157th (Highland Light Infantry) Brigade

Anzac Mounted Division (Major General Sir H.G. Chauvel)

1st Australian Light Horse Brigade (Brigadier General J. B. H. Meredith)

1st Light Horse Regiment
2nd Light Horse Regiment
3rd Light Horse Regiment

2nd Australian Light Horse Brigade (Brigadier General J. R. Royston)

Wellington Mounted Rifle Regiment (Lieutenant Colonel W. Meldrum) detached from New Zealand Mounted Rifles Brigade
6th Light Horse Regiment
7th Light Horse Regiment
(5th Light Horse Regiment at Duidar)

Force moved to Romani during 4 August and took part in the battle

5th Mounted Brigade (Brigadier General E.A. Wiggin)

Gloucestershire Hussars
Warwickshire Yeomanry
Worcestershire Yeomanry

New Zealand Mounted Rifles Brigade (Brigadier General E. W. C. Chaytor)

Auckland Mounted Rifle Regiment (Lieutenant Colonel C. E. R. Mackesy)
Canterbury Mounted Rifle Regiment (Lieutenant Colonel J. Findlay)

Force moved to Romani during 4 August and took part in the battle on 5 August

42nd (East Lancashire) Division

125th (Lancashire Fusiliers) Brigade
126th (East Lancashire) Brigade
127th (Manchester) Brigade

3rd Australian Light Horse Brigade

8th Light Horse Regiment
9th Light Horse Regiment
10th Light Horse Regiment

=== Eastern Frontier Force ===
October 1916

Eastern Frontier Force, also known as Eastern Force, was formed in Cairo on 18 October 1916 with headquarters at Ismailia. The force was commanded by Lieutenant General Charles Dobell, who had commanded Western Frontier Force. Eastern Force consisted of

52nd (Lowland) Division

155th (South Scottish) Brigade
156th (Scottish Rifles) Brigade
157th (Highland Light Infantry) Brigade

53rd (Welsh) Division

158th (North Wales) Brigade
159th (Cheshire) Brigade
160th (Welsh Border) Brigade

54th (East Anglian) Division

161st (Essex) Brigade
162nd (East Midland) Brigade
163rd (Norfolk and Suffolk) Brigade

Anzac Mounted Division

1st Australian Light Horse Brigade

1st Light Horse Regiment
2nd Light Horse Regiment
3rd Light Horse Regiment
4th Light Horse Regiment (attached)

2nd Australian Light Horse Brigade

5th Light Horse Regiment
6th Light Horse Regiment
7th Light Horse Regiment
12th Light Horse Regiment (attached)

3rd Australian Light Horse Brigade (commander Brevet Lieutenant Colonel J. M. Antill)

8th Light Horse Regiment
9th Light Horse Regiment
10th Light Horse Regiment
11th Light Horse Regiment (attached)

New Zealand Mounted Rifles Brigade

Auckland Mounted Rifles Regiment
Canterbury Mounted Rifles Regiment
Wellington Mounted Rifles Regiment
Otago Mounted Rifles Regiment (less one squadron attached)

4 Territorial Royal Horse Artillery Batteries 2 Scottish and 2 English (Ayrshire, Inverness-shire, Somerset and Leicestershire Batteries)

5th Mounted Brigade

Gloucestershire Hussars
Warwickshire Yeomanry
Worcestershire Yeomanry

Imperial Camel Corps Brigade
2 Light Car Patrols

No. 1 Squadron, Australian Flying Corps

=== Western Frontier Force ===
October 1916 to February 1917

Western Desert Force (Major General William Watson)

Egyptian Army troops Darfur

Sollum Recapture (Major General W. E. Peyton)
Siwa Raid (General H. W. Hodgson)

1st Light Horse Brigade
Imperial Camel Corps
Bikanir Camel Corps
Armoured Car Brigade (11 Rolls–Royces)
6 Light Car Patrols (Model T Fords armed with Lewis guns)

=== Order of battle 23 December ===
Anzac Mounted Division (Major General Chauvel)

1st Light Horse Brigade

1st Light Horse Regiment
2nd Light Horse Regiment
3rd Light Horse Regiment

3rd Light Horse Brigade

8th Light Horse Regiment
9th Light Horse Regiment
10th Light Horse Regiment

New Zealand Mounted Rifles Brigade (Brigadier General E. W. C. Chaytor)

Auckland Mounted Rifle Regiment (Lieutenant Colonel C. E. R. Mackesy)
Canterbury Mounted Rifle Regiment (Lieutenant Colonel J. Findlay)
Wellington Mounted Rifle Regiment (Lieutenant Colonel W. Meldrum)

Imperial Camel Corps Brigade
Hong Kong & Singapore Mountain Battery,
Inverness-shire and Somerset Batteries Royal Horse Artillery
No. 1 Squadron Australian Flying Corps
No. 14 Squadron Royal Flying Corps

=== Desert Column December ===
Desert Column Headquarters El Arish (Lieutenant General Sir Philip Chetwode)

42nd (East Lancashire) Division

125th (Lancashire Fusiliers) Brigade
126th (East Lancashire) Brigade
127th (Manchester) Brigade

52nd (Lowland) Division (Major General W. E. B. Smith)

155th (South Scottish) Brigade
156th (Scottish Rifles) Brigade
157th (Highland Light Infantry) Brigade

Anzac Mounted Division (Major General H. G. Chauvel)

1st Light Horse Brigade
2nd Light Horse Brigade
3rd Light Horse Brigade
New Zealand Mounted Rifles Brigade

Imperial Camel Corps Brigade

Royal Flying Corps 5th Wing stationed at Mustabig (Lieutenant Colonel W. G. H. Salmond)

No. 14 (British) Squadron
(No. 17 Squadron)
No. 1 Squadron Australian Flying Corps / No. 67 (Australian) Squadron

== 1917 ==
Royal Flying Corps in Egypt in January 1917

Headquarters Middle East Brigade
5th Wing

No. 14 Squadron Royal Flying Corps
No. 67 Squadron Royal Flying Corps

20th Reserve Wing

Nos. 21, 22, 23, 57 and 58 Reserve Squadrons

No. 3 School of Military Aeronautics.

By January 1917 there were three smaller commands directly under GHQ EEF.

Western Force

Bikanir Camel Corps
230th Brigade
231st Brigade
Detachments R.A., dismounted (seven 15-pdr. guns, two 9-pdr. Krupp guns, two Naval 4-in. guns)
5 Armoured Motor Batteries
6 Light Car Patrols (Ford)
Motor Machine Gun Battery
1 Garrison Battalion

Alexandria District

103rd Local Company RGA
5th Battalion British West Indies Regiment (Note: This could be the 3rd Battalion mentioned in Falls EEF April 1916 order of battle. [Falls 1930 Vol. 1 p. 389] However in his EEF April 1917 order of battle he again mentions only the 1st 2nd and 5th Battalions. [Falls 1930 Vol. 1 pp. 402, 404])

2 Garrison Battalions

Delta District

2nd Battalion North Lancs Regiment (from East Africa)
1/4th Battalion Duke of Cornwall's Light Infantry (from Aden)
5 Garrison Battalions

With the front line approaching Gaza, the defence of the Suez Canal was still part of Eastern Force but had been reduced to:

Northern Section Suez Canal

20th Indian Brigade
1st Battalion British West Indies Regiment
2nd Battalion British West Indies Regiment
3 Garrison Battalions

Southern Section Suez Canal

Imperial Service Cavalry Brigade
2 Companies Imperial Camel Corps
267th Brigade RFA (53rd Division)
272nd Brigade RFA (54th Division)
229th Brigade (to form part of the 74th Division).

=== Order of Battle 9 January ===
Desert Column (Lieutenant General Philip Chetwode)

Anzac Mounted Division (Major General Harry Chauvel)

1st Light Horse Brigade (Brigadier General Charles Frederick Cox)
3rd Light Horse Brigade (Brigadier General John Royston)
New Zealand Mounted Rifles Brigade (Brigadier General Edward Chaytor)
Inverness-shire, Leicestershire and Somerset Territorial Royal Horse Artillery batteries

Imperial Camel Corps Brigade

1st (Australian) Battalion
2nd (British) Battalion
3rd (Australian) Battalion
4th (Australian and New Zealand) Battalion
Hong Kong and Singapore Mountain Battery

5th Mounted Brigade

Honourable Artillery Company (18–pounder) Battery

No. 7 Light Car Patrol (six Ford cars equipped with machine guns)
No. 1 Squadron Australian Flying Corps
No. 14 Squadron Royal Flying Corps

=== Order of Battle March ===
Eastern Force (Lieutenant General Sir C. M. Dobell)

Imperial Camel Corps Brigade (Brigadier General S. Smith)

1st (Australian) Battalion
2nd (British) Battalion
3rd (Australian) Battalion
4th (Anzac) Battalion

52nd (Lowland) Division (Major General W. E. B. Smith)

155th (South Scottish) Brigade

1/4th Battalion, Royal Scots Fusiliers
1/5th Battalion, Royal Scots Fusiliers
1/4th Battalion, King's Own Scottish Borderers
1/5th Battalion, King's Own Scottish Borderers

156th (Scottish Rifles) Brigade

1/7th Battalion, Cameronians (Scottish Rifles)
1/8th Battalion, Cameronians (Scottish Rifles)
1/4th Battalion, Royal Scots
1/7th Battalion, Royal Scots

157th (Highland Light Infantry) Brigade

1/5th Battalion, Highland Light Infantry
1/6th Battalion, Highland Light Infantry
1/7th Battalion, Highland Light Infantry
1/5th Battalion, Argyll and Sutherland Highlanders

54th (East Anglian) Division (Major General S. W. Hare)

161st (Essex) Brigade

1/4th Battalion, Essex Regiment
1/5th Battalion, Essex Regiment
1/6th Battalion, Essex Regiment
1/7th Battalion, Essex Regiment

162nd (East Midland) Brigade

1/5th Battalion, Bedfordshire Regiment
1/4th Battalion, Northamptonshire Regiment
1/10th Battalion, London Regiment (Hackney)
1/11th Battalion, London Regiment (Finsbury Rifles)

163rd (Norfolk and Suffolk) Brigade

1/4th Battalion, Norfolk Regiment
1/5th Battalion, Norfolk Regiment
1/5th Battalion, Suffolk Regiment
1/8th Battalion, Hampshire Regiment

74th (Yeomanry) Division (Major General E. S. Girdwood)

229th Brigade

16th Battalion, Devonshire Regiment
12th Battalion, Somerset Light Infantry
12th Battalion, Royal Scots Fusiliers
14th Battalion, Black Watch (Royal Highland Regiment)

No. 7 Light Car Patrol
Nos. 11 and 12 Armoured Motor Batteries
5th Wing Royal Flying Corps

No. 1 Squadron Australian Flying Corps
No. 14 Squadron Royal Flying Corps

Desert Column (Lieutenant General P. Chetwode)

53rd (Welsh) Division (Major General A. G. Dallas)

158th (North Wales) Brigade (Brigadier General H. A. Vernon)

1/5th Battalion, Royal Welsh Fusiliers
1/6th Battalion, Royal Welsh Fusiliers
1/7th Battalion, Royal Welsh Fusiliers
1/1st Battalion, Herefordshire Regiment
158th Brigade Machine Gun Company

159th (Cheshire) Brigade (Brigadier General N. Money)

1/4th Battalion, Cheshire Regiment
1/7th Battalion, Cheshire Regiment
1/4th Battalion, Welch Regiment
1/5th Battalion Welch Regiment
159th Brigade Machine Gun Company

160th (Welsh Border) Brigade (Brigadier General V. L. N. Pearson)

2/4th Battalion Royal West Surrey Regiment
1/4th Battalion, Royal Sussex Regiment
2/4th Battalion, Royal West Kent Regiment
2/10th Battalion, Middlesex Regiment
160th Brigade Machine Gun Company Anzac Mounted Division (Major General H. G. Chauvel)

2nd Light Horse Brigade (Brigadier General Granville Ryrie)

5th Light Horse Regiment
6th Light Horse Regiment
7th Light Horse Regiment

New Zealand Mounted Rifles Brigade (Brigadier General Edward Chaytor)

Auckland Mounted Rifle Regiment
Canterbury Mounted Rifle Regiment
Wellington Mounted Rifle Regiment

22nd Mounted Yeomanry Brigade (Brigadier General Fryer)

1/1st Lincolnshire Yeomanry
1/1st Staffordshire Yeomanry
1/1st East Riding Yeomanry

Imperial Mounted Division (less 4th Light Horse Brigade) (Major General Henry West Hodgson)

3rd Light Horse Brigade (Brigadier General Royston/L. C. Wilson)

8th Light Horse Regiment
9th Light Horse Regiment
10th Light Horse Regiment

5th Mounted Brigade (Brigadier General Percy Desmond FitzGerald)

Royal Gloucestershire Hussars
Warwickshire Yeomanry
Worcestershire Hussars

6th Mounted Yeomanry Brigade (Lieutenant Colonel (temp. Brigadier General) T. M. S. Pitt/Brigadier General C. A. C. Godwin)

Dorset Yeomanry
Berkshire Yeomanry
Royal Buckinghamshire Yeomanry

Artillery

- 53rd (Welsh) Division (3 Brigades RFA 12 18–pdrs=24 guns) 4 of each battery only = 16 guns; 4 4.5-inch howitzers = 8 howitzer
- 54th (East Anglian) Division (3 Brigades RFA 12 18–pdrs=24 guns) 4 of each battery only = 16 guns; 4 4.5-inch howitzers = 8 howitzer
- Anzac Mounted Division 4 Batteries RHA of 4 18–pdrs = 16 guns
- Imperial Mounted Division 4 Batteries RHA of 4 18–pdrs = 16 guns
- Imperial Camel Brigade 1 Camel Pack Battery of 6 2.75-inch = 6 guns
- Army Troops (3 Batteries of 4 60–pdrs=12 guns) one section only = 6 guns (Note: The third brigades of 53rd and 54th Divisions were in the Suez Canal Defences with 1st Light Horse Brigade about Bir el Abd, Mazar and Bardawil patrolling the pipeline until moving to El Arish on 20 March. And only four guns of each 18–pounder battery of the 53rd and 54th Divisions, and one section of each heavy battery were brought across the Sinai Peninsula. The guns left behind formed part of the Suez Canal Defences. [Wavell 1968, p. 94, 1st Light Horse Brigade War Diary March 1917 AWM4-10-1-32])

=== Organization in April 1917 ===
General Headquarters

General Headquarters Troops

Southern Canal Section

Cyprus Detachment

Eastern Force

Force Troops
Desert Column
Northern Canal Section

Delta and Western Force
Alexandria District

1st Garrison Battalion, Essex Regiment at Khartoum

=== Order of Battle April ===
General Headquarters Commander in Chief Lieutenant General (temp. General) A. J. Murray

Eastern Force GOC Major General (temp. Lieutenant General) C. M. Dobell Brigadier General General Staff Brevet Lieutenant Colonel (temp. Brigadier General) G. P. Dawnay

Force Troops

Mounted Troops

Imperial Camel Brigade GOC Major (temp. Brigadier General) C. L. Smith

1st (Australian and New Zealand) Battalion
2nd (Imperial) Battalion
3rd (Australian and New Zealand) Battalion
Hong Kong and Singapore Camel Battery
Brigade Signal Section
Brigade Field Troop
Brigade Machine Gun Company
1/1st Scottish Horse Field Ambulance

Imperial Service Cavalry Brigade GOC Major (temp. Brigadier General) M. H. Henderson

Mysore Lancers
1st Hyderabad Lancers
Kathiwar Signal Troop
124th Indian Cavalry Field Ambulance

Artillery

XCVI Heavy Artillery Group (four 4-gun 60-pdr, one siege battery)
Nos. 30, 38, 55, 85, 96 Anti-Aircraft Sections

Machine Gune Corps

"E" Company, Heavy Section (Tanks)
Nos. 11 and 12 Light Armoured Car Batteries
17th Motor Machine Gun Battery
Nos. 1 and 3 Armoured Trains

Engineers

220th and 555th Army Troops Companies
No. 10 Company (Kings's Own) Sappers and Miners
1/23rd and 2/23rd Sikh Pioneers
360th Company, RE (water unit)

Signal Service

GHQ Signal Company
Pigeon Section
N 14, N 15, N 23, N 24, No. 61 Airline Sections
BR, NA, NB, NN Cable Sections
No. 9 Wagon and London Pack W/T Sections

52nd (Lowland) Division GOC Brevet Colonel (temp. Major General) W. E. B. Smith

155th (South Scottish) Brigade
156th (Scottish Rifles) Brigade
157th (Highland Light Infantry) Brigade
Artillery

261st Brigade RFA
262nd Brigade RFA
263rd Brigade RFA (troops same as April 1916 oob less cyclist company)

53rd (Welsh) Division GOC Major General S. F. Mott

158th (North Wales) Brigade
159th (Cheshire) Brigade
160th (Welsh Border) Brigade
Artillery

265th Brigade RFA
266th Brigade RFA
267th Brigade RFA

(troops same as April 1916 oob)

54th (East Anglian) Division GOC Colonel (temp. Major General) S. W. Hare

161st (Essex) Brigade
162nd (East Midland) Brigade
163rd (Norfolk and Suffolk) Brigade
Artillery

270th Brigade RFA
271st Brigade RFA
272nd Brigade RFA

(troops same as April 1916 oob)

74th (Yeomanry) Division GOC Brevet Lieutenant Colonel (temp. Major General) E. S. Girdwood

229th Brigade

16th (R. 1st Devon and R. N. Devon Yeo Bn) Devonshire Regiment
12th (W. Somerset Yeo. Bn) Somerset Light Infantry
14th (Fife and Forfar Yeo. Bn) Royal Highlanders
12th (Ayr and Lanark Yeo Bn) Royal Scots Fusiliers
4th Machine Gun Company

230th Brigade

10th (Royal East Kent and West Kent Yeomanry) Battalion, Buffs (Royal East Kent Regiment)
16th (Sussex Yeomanry) Battalion, Royal Sussex Regiment
15th (Suffolk Yeomanry) Battalion, Suffolk Regiment
12th (Norfolk Yeomanry) Battalion, Norfolk Regiment
209th Machine Gun Company

231st Brigade

10th (Shrop. and Chester Yeomanry) Battalion, Shropshire Light Infantry
24th (Denbigh Yeomanry) Battalion, Royal Welch Fusiliers
24th (Pembroke and Glamorgan Yeomanry) Battalion, Welch Regiment
25th (Montgomery and Welsh Horse Yeomanry) Battalion, Royal Welch Fusiliers
210th Machine Gun Company

Divisional Troops

Mounted Troops

1 Squadron 1/2nd County of London Yeomanry

Engineers

5th Royal Monmouth Field Company RE
5th Royal Anglesey Field Company RE

Signal Service

74th Divisional Signal Company

ASC

74th Divisional Train

Medical Units

229th, 230th, 231st Field Ambulances

Desert Column GOC Major General (temp. Lieutenant General) P. W. Chetwode

Anzac Mounted Division GOC Colonel (temp. Major General) H. G. Chauvel

1st Australian Light Horse Brigade [Anzac Mounted Division] GOC Lieutenant Colonel C. F. Cox

1st Light Horse Regiment
2nd Light Horse Regiment
3rd Light Horse Regiment
1st Australian Light Horse Signal Troop
1st Australian Machine Gun Squadron

2nd Australian Light Horse Brigade GOC Colonel (temp. Brigadier General) G. de L. Ryrie

5th Light Horse Regiment
6th Light Horse Regiment
7th Light Horse Regiment
2nd Australian Light Horse Signal Troop
2nd Australian Machine Gun Squadron

New Zealand Mounted Rifles Brigade GOC Brigadier General E. W. C. Chaytor

Auckland Mounted Rifle Regiment
Canterbury Mounted Rifle Regiment
Wellington Mounted Rifle Regiment
New Zealand Mounted Rifles Signal Troop
New Zealand Machine Gun Squadron

22nd Mounted Brigade GOC Colonel (temp. Brigadier General) F. A. B. Fryer

1/1st Lincolnshire Yeomanry
1/1st Staffordshire Yeomanry
1/1st East Riding Yeomanry
22nd Mounted Brigade Signal Troop
18th Machine Gun Squadron

Divisional Troops

Artillery

III (T.F.) Brigade RHA Leicester and Somerset Batteries
IV (T.F.) Brigade RHA Inverness-shire and Ayrshire Batteries – no longer brigaded
Mounted Divisional Ammunition Column

Engineers

1st Australian Field Squadron

Signal Service

1st Anzac Signal Squadron

Army Service Corps (ASC)

HQ, Light Horse Divisional ASC
Nos 26 and 27 Australian Units of Supply

Medical Units

1st, 2nd Light Horse and the 1/1st North Midland Mounted Brigade Field Ambulance
NZ Mounted Brigade Ambulance

Imperial Mounted Division GOC Colonel (temp. Major General) H. W. Hodgson

3rd Light Horse Brigade GOC Colonel (temp. Brigadier General) J. R. Royston

8th Light Horse Regiment
9th Light Horse Regiment
10th Light Horse Regiment
3rd Australian Light Horse Signal Troop
3rd Australian Machine Gun Squadron

4th Light Horse Brigade GOC Lieutenant Colonel (temp. Brigadier General) J. B. Meredith

4th Light Horse Regiment
11th Light Horse Regiment
12th Light Horse Regiment
4th Australian Light Horse Signal Troop
4th Australian Machine Gun Squadron

5th Mounted Brigade GOC Colonel (temp. Brigadier General) E. A. Wiggin

1/1st Warwick Yeomanry
1/1st Gloucester Yeomanry
1/1st Worcester Yeomanry
5th Mounted Brigade Signal Troop
16th Machine Gun Squadron

6th Mounted Brigade GOC Lieutenant Colonel (temp. Brigadier General) T. M. S. Pitt

1/1st Buckinghamshire Yeomanry
1/1st Berkshire Yeomanry
1/1st Dorsetshire Yeomanry
6th Brigade Signal Troop
17th Machine Gun Squadron

Divisional Troops

Artillery

1/1st Nottinghamshire and 1/1st Berkshire Batteries RHA
"A" and "B" Batteries, H.A.C.
Mounted Divisional Ammunition Column

Engineers

Imperial Mounted Division Field Squadron

Signal Service

Imperial Mounted Division Signal Squadron

ASC (unidentified)
Medical Units

3rd and 4th Light Horse, 1/1st and 1/2nd South Midland Mounted Brigades Field Ambulances

Northern Canal Section GOC Colonel (temp. Brigadier General) H. D. Watson commander of 20th Indian Brigade

Mounted Troops

1/2nd County of London Yeomanry (less two squadrons)
16th Company Imperial Camel Corps (attached from 4th Battalion)

Infantry

20th Indian Brigade (attached)

Alwar Infantry (I.S.)
Gwalior Infantry (I.S.)
Patiala Infantry (I.S.)
Signal Section
121st (Indian) Field Ambulance

1st Battalion British West Indies Regiment
2nd Battalion British West Indies Regiment
1st Garrison Battalion, Notts and Derby Regiment (two companies)
19th Garrison Battalion, Rifle Brigade

Medical Units

1/1st Lowland Mounted Brigade Field Ambulance

Delta and Western Force GOC Brevet Colonel (temp. Brigadier General) H. G. Casson

Mounted Troops

Bikanir Camel Corps
Nos. 8 and 10 Companies Imperial Camel Corps
"B" Squadron 1/2nd County of London Yeomanry (attached Imperial School of Instruction, Zeitoun)

Infantry

2nd Garrison Battalion, Royal Welch Fusiliers
2/7th Battalion, Northumberland Fusiliers
6th Garrison Battalion, Royal Welch Fusiliers
20th Garrison Battalion, Rifle Brigade
21st Garrison Battalion, Rifle Brigade
22nd Garrison Battalion, Rifle Brigade
1st Garrison Battalion, Royal Warwickshire Regiment
1st Garrison Battalion, Devonshire Regiment
1st Garrison Battalion, Royal Irish Regiment
One Company, 3rd Infantry Battalion, Egyptian Army

Artillery

Detachment, Royal Marine Artillery (2 Naval 4-inch guns)
No. 2 Armoured Train
Detachments RFA dismounted (three 15-pdr, Q.F., two 15-pdr BLC, two 15-pdr Ehrhardt and two 9-pdr Krupp guns)
Nos 1, 2, 3 Light Armoured Motor Batteries
Six Light Car Patrols (Ford cars)

Signal Service

Western Force Signal Company
No. 42 Airline Section
UU Cable Section
Pigeon Section (detachment)
No. 6 Wagon and No. 6 Pack W/T Section

ASC

Mechanical transport

5th, 6th, 29th Reserve Field Ambulance and Workshop Units
Western Force Mechanical Transport Supply Company
Advanced M.T. Supply Depot (Samalut)
No. 303 (M.T.) Company ASC

Camel Transport

"H" and "O" Companies, Egyptian Camel Transport Corps

Alexandria District GOC Colonel (temp. Brigadier General) R. C. Boyle

Coast Defence Artillery

No. 103rd Local Company, RGA
Ras el Tin Fort
Royal Malta Artillery (detachment)
Quarantine and Chatby Batteries
Mex Fort

Infantry

5th [sic probably 3rd] Battalion, British West Indies Regiment
1st Garrison Battalion, Liverpool Regiment
2nd Garrison battalion, Cheshire Regiment

General Headquarters Troops

Royal Flying Corps Middle East Brigade RFC GOC Brevet Lieutenant Colonel (temp. Brigadier General) W. G. H. Salmond

5th Wing

Nos 14 and 67 (Australian) Squadrons

20th Reserve Wing

Nos 21, 22, 23, 57, 58 Reserve Squadrons

Engineers

Railway Operating Division

115th and 116th Railway Companies RE
2 Companies Railway Battalion Sappers and Miners
Topographical Section RE

Signal Service

"M" (L. of C.) Signal Company
Nos 12 and 62 Airline Sections
BQ, BS Cable Sections
Northern Wagon, Southern Motor and No. 12 Pack W/T Sections

ASC

Mechanical transport

HQ, ASC Motor Boat Company
Two Advanced M.T. Sub Depots (Ismailia and Qantara)
52nd Highland Mounted Brigade, 6th Reserve and 29th Field Ambulance and Workshop Units

Camel Transport

Nos 1 and 2 Came Transport Depots
"O" [sic] and "R" Companies, Egyptian Camel Transport Corps

Southern Canal Section GOC Brevet Colonel (temp. Brigadier General) P. C. Palin in addition to GOC 29th Indian Brigade

Mounted Troops

4th (Australian and New Zealand) Battalion, Imperial Camel Corps (less 15th Coy, attached 3rd Battalion and 16th Coy attached Northern Canal Section with 13th Coy from 3rd Battalion attached)

Engineers

14th Army Troops Company RE
496th (Kent) Field Company (less detachment)

Infantry

232nd Brigade (first brigade of the yet to be formed 75th Division )

2nd Loyal North Lancashire
1/4th Duke of Cornwall's Light Infantry (both temporarily attached to Eastern Force)
1/5th Devonshire Regiment
2/5th Hampshire Regiment

29th Indian Brigade

2/3rd Gurkhas
3/3rd Gurkhas
123rd Rifles
Brigade Signal Section
123rd Indian Field Ambulance
Indian Brigade Supply Column

49th Indian Brigade

58th Rifles
1/101st Grenadiers
1/102nd Grenadiers
110th Indian Field Ambulance

1st Garrison Battalion Notts and Derby Regiment (less two companies)
1st Garrison Battalion, Northampton Regiment

ASC

No. 900 Company ASC (Auxiliary Horse Transport Company, Ismailia)

Cyprus Detachment

1st Garrison Battalion Royal Scots

and Lines of Communications controlled by GHQ including RFC "X" Aircraft Park (5th Wing), "X" Aircraft Depot for all Middle East units RFC, Engineers, Signal Service, ASC, Medical Units, Ordnance, Veterinary, Remounts and Postal Units.

=== Expansion of Desert Column June 1917 ===
Desert Column was expanded to three divisions, commanded by Chauvel –

Anzac Mounted Division commanded by Major General Chaytor

1st Light Horse Brigade
2nd Light Horse Brigade
New Zealand Mounted Rifle Brigade
18th Brigade, Royal Horse Artillery (18 pounder guns)

Australian Mounted Division commanded by Major General Hodgson

3rd Light Horse Brigade
4th Light Horse Brigade
5th Mounted Brigade
19th Brigade, Royal Horse Artillery (18 pounder guns)

Yeomanry Mounted Division commanded by Major General G. de S. Barrow

6th Mounted Brigade
8th Mounted Brigade (recently arrived from Salonika)
22nd Mounted Brigade (recently arrived from Salonika)
20th Brigade, Royal Horse Artillery (13 pounder guns)

Army Troops

Imperial Camel Corps Brigade
7th Yeomanry Brigade (two regiments)
an unidentified battery.

At the end of June 1917 General Allenby took command. At that time the Egyptian Expeditionary Force consisted of the British XX Corps and the British XXI Corps, under the command of Lieutenant Generals Philip Chetwode and Edward Stanislaus Bulfin, respectively, along with the Desert Mounted Corps commanded by Lieutenant General Harry Chauvel. The air component was the Palestine Brigade of the Royal Flying Corps (later the Royal Air Force) and the Australian Flying Corps.

=== Order of Battle October ===
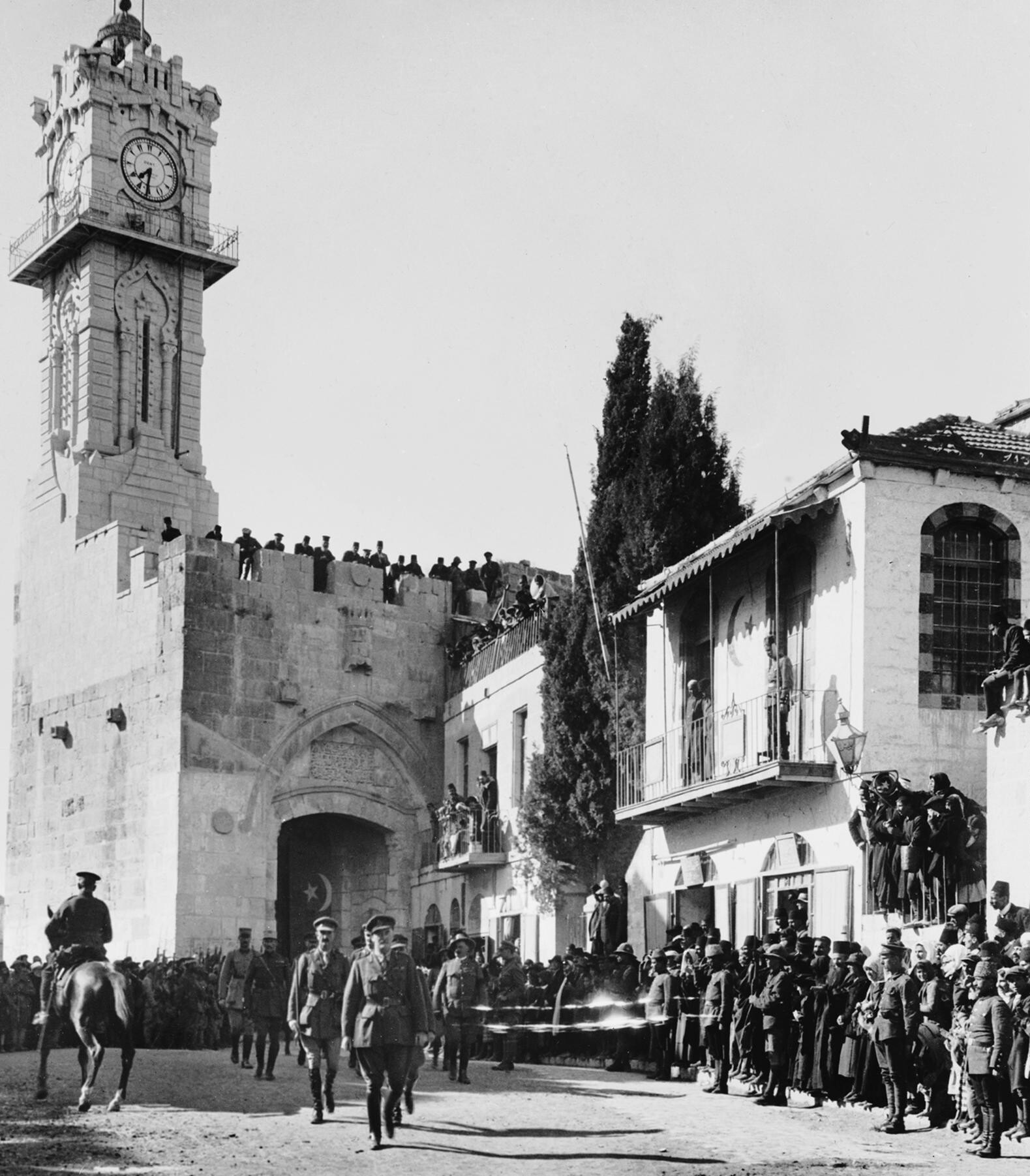
The commander of the Egyptian Expeditionary Force, General Sir Edmund Allenby entering the Holy City of Jerusalem on foot December 1917

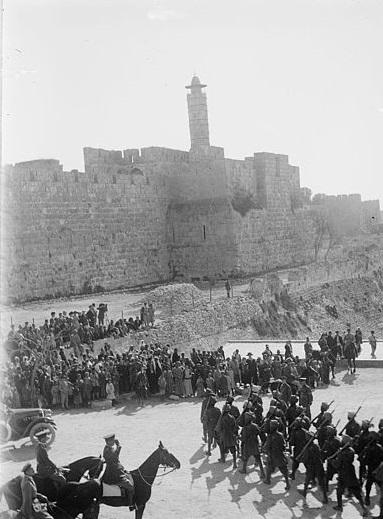
British troops on parade at Jaffa Gate in December 1917 after the capture and occupation of Palestine.

XX Corps (Lieutenant General Sir R.W. Chetwode, Bart.)

10th (Irish) Division (Major General J.R. Longley) (Note: Nominally Army Troops. [Keogh 1955 p. 135])

29th Brigade
30th Brigade
31st Brigade

53rd (Welsh) Division (Major General S.F. Mott)

158th (North Wales) Brigade
159th (Cheshire) Brigade
160th (Welsh Border) Brigade

60th (2/2nd London) Division (Major General J.S.M. Shea)

179th (2/4th London) Brigade
180th (2/5th London) Brigade
181st (2/6th London) Brigade

74th (Yeomanry) Division (Major General E.S. Girdwood)

229th Brigade
230th Brigade
231st Brigade

Corps Cavalry Regiment – 1/2nd County of London Yeomanry
Corps Artillery – 96th Heavy Artillery Group

XXI Corps (Lieutenant General Sir E.S. Bulfin)

52nd (Lowland) Division (Major General J. Hill)

155th (South Scottish) Brigade
156th (Scottish Rifles) Brigade
157th (Highland Light Infantry) Brigade

54th (East Anglian) Division (Major General S.W. Hare)

161st (Essex) Brigade
162nd (East Midland) Brigade
163rd (Norfolk and Suffolk) Brigade

75th Division(Major General P.C. Palin)

232nd Brigade
233rd Brigade
234th Brigade

Corps Cavalry Regiment – Composite Yeomanry Regt.
Corps Artillery – 97th, 100th, 102nd Heavy Artillery Groups
20th Indian Brigade (Brigadier General H.D. Watson)

Desert Mounted Corps (Lieutenant General Sir H. Chauvel)

Anzac Mounted Division (Major General E.W.C. Chaytor)

1st Light Horse Brigade (Brigadier General C. F. Cox)

1st, 2nd and 3rd Australian Light Horse Regiments

2nd Light Horse Brigade (Brigadier General G. de L. Ryrie)

5th, 6th and 7th Australian Light Horse Regiments

New Zealand Mounted Rifle Brigade (Brigadier General W. Meldrum)

Auckland, Canterbury and Wellington Mounted Rifle Regiments

18th Brigade RHA (Inverness-shire, Ayrshire and Somerset Batteries) of 13–pounder guns and Divisional Ammunition Column

Australian Mounted Division (Major General Henry W. Hodgson)

3rd Light Horse Brigade (Brigadier General L. C. Wilson)

8th, 9th and 10th Australian Light Horse Regiments

4th Light Horse Brigade (Brigadier General W. Grant)

4th, 11th and 12th Australian Light Horse Regiments

5th Mounted Brigade (Brigadier Generals Percy Desmond FitzGerald/P. J. V. Kelly)

Gloucestershire Husssars, Warwickshire and Worcestershire Yeomanry Regiments

19th Brigade RHA (A and B Batteries Honourable Artillery Company and Notts Battery RHA) of 13–pounder guns and Divisional Ammunition Column

Yeomanry Mounted Division (Major General G. de S. Barrow)

6th Mounted Brigade (Brigadier General C. A. C. Godwin)

Dorset, Bucks and Berks Yeomanry Regiments

8th Mounted Brigade (Brigadier General C. S. Rome)

1st City of London and 1st and 3rd County of London Yeomanry Regiments

22nd Mounted Brigade (Brigadier General P. D. FitzGerald)

Stafford, Lincoln and East Riding Yeomanry Regiments

20th Brigade RHA (Berkshire, Hampshire and Leicestershire Batteries) of 13–pounder guns and Divisional Ammunition Column

Corps Reserve

7th Mounted Brigade (Brigadier General J. T. Wigan)

Sherwood Rangers, South Notts and Herts Yeomanry Regiments with the Essex Battery RHA and Brigade Ammunition Column

Imperial Camel Corps Brigade (Brigadier General C. L. Smith)

2nd (British) Battalion
3rd (Australian and New Zealand) Battalion
4th (Australian and New Zealand) Battalion
Hong Kong and Singapore Camel Battery RGA. (Note: Keogh notes the 7th Mounted Brigade had only two regiments. He places six squadrons of Indian Imperial Service troops, one West Indies battalion, French and Italian contingents in Army Troops, totalling 3,000. He also places the Imperial Camel Corps Brigade in Desert Mounted Corps. [Keogh 1955 p. 135])

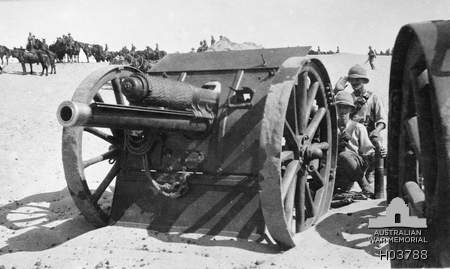
British 18-pounders as used until September 1917

On establishment in 1916 and 1917, the first two mounted divisions had been supplied with 18–pounder artillery guns. In September 1917 these guns were replaced with 13-pounders, making the divisions "even more capable", according to Erickson.

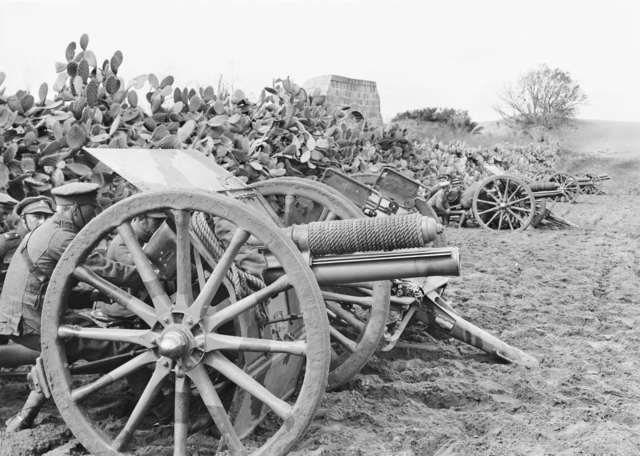
HAC 13-pounders in March 1918

General Headquarters Troops

Army Cavalry

Imperial Service Cavalry Brigade (Major (temp. Brigadier General) M. H. Henderson)

Jodhpur Lancers
Mysore Lancers

1st Hyderabad Lancers

Kathiwar Signal Troop
124th Indian Cavalry Field Ambulance.

Royal Flying Corps, Middle East (Brigadier General W. G. H. Salmond to 5 November then Brigadier General W. S. Brancker to 3 January 1918 when Salmond returned)

Palestine Brigade (composite Royal Flying Corps RFC and Australian Flying Corps (AFC) (Lieutenant Colonel A. E. Borton) operational from 27 October to 7 November 1917)

5th (Artillery Corps) Wing at Deir el Belah

No. 14 Squadron RFC at Deir el Belah and allotted to XXI Corps
No. 113 Squadron RFC at Sheikh Nuran (2 flights allotted to XX Corps; 1 flight to Desert Mounted Corps) (Note: Shown as No. 113 Squadron in Falls 1930 Vol. 2 p. 666)
No. 21 Kite Balloon Company (Note: Shown as part of the 40th Wing by Falls 1930 Vol. 2 p. 666) consisting of –

No. 49 Kite Balloon Section at Sheikh Shabasi
No. 50 Kite Balloon Section at Wadi Ghuzze.

40th (Army) Wing Headquarters at Deir el Belah

No. 11 Squadron RFC at Deir el Belah
No. 67 Squadron (No. 1 Squadron Australian Flying Corps) at Shiekh Nuran. (A special squadron was formed from the 20th Training Wing at Aboukir on 24 October for duty at Nuran under the direct orders of the Palestine Brigade for operations consisting of bombing raids on enemy camps, dumps, trench works and battery positions.)

Aircraft Park – "X" Aircraft Park at Abbassia with an advanced stores section at Kantara was responsible for the supplies to the RFC in Palestine.

Also in General Headquarters Troops were the

VIII Mountain Brigade RGA (10th and 11th Batteries of 3.7inch howitzers)
IX Mountain Brigade RGA of "A" and "B" Batteries of 2.75 inch howitzers and the 12th Battery of 3.7 inch howitzers. (Note: The 7th Mounted Brigade and the Imperial Camel Corps Brigade had been attached to Desert Mounted Corps and the 10th Division attached to the XX Corps. [Falls 1930 Vol. 2 p. 666])

== 1918 ==
The force initially consisted mostly of British and Egyptian troops, but most of the former were sent to the Western Front in early 1918 to help repel Germany's Spring Offensive. In the meantime, new troops were then dispatched from India, Australia, and New Zealand, in particular who made up a large portion of the army. Though it was feared that mostly Muslim Indian troops might desert and join Ottoman Empire forces in the region (who had declared a jihad against the Allies early in the war), this fear proved unfounded, as the Indians fought valiantly on the front lines of most of the army's major engagements. The force also included a small contingent of French and Italian troops. (These were known as the Détachement Français de Palestine et de Syrie and Distaccamento Italiano di Palestina commanded by Colonel Gilles de Philpin de Piépape & Lieutenant Colonel Francesco D'Agostino respectively.) The forces of the Arab Revolt, led by Prince Feisal of Mecca, were also unofficially attached during Allenby's Damascus offensive.

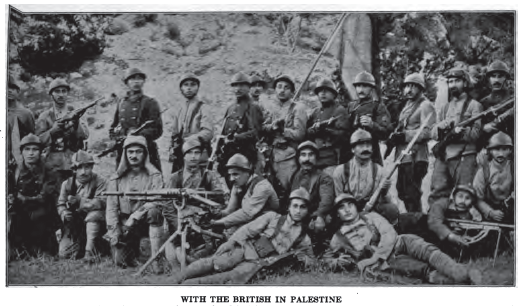
The force also included contingents of Armenian soldiers

The force's role evolved from a defense of Egypt to the invasion of Palestine which involved: the capture of Beersheba and Gaza in October–November 1917 (see Third Battle of Gaza), entering Jerusalem on 11 December 1917, and Allenby's successful campaign of 1918, resulting in the defeat of the Turks at Megiddo, and the capture of Damascus, Beirut, and Aleppo. The force's successes ultimately led to Turkey's exit from the war and the creation of the British Mandate of Palestine.

The Palestine Brigade RAF was reorganised at the end of 1917 or during the summer of 1918, as follows:

5th (Corps) Wing

No. 14 Squadron RAF
No. 113 Squadron RAF
No. 142 Squadron RAF

40th (Army) Wing

No. 111 Squadron RAF
No. 144 Squadron RAF
No. 145 Squadron RAF
No. 1 Squadron AFC
No. 21 Balloon Company
Nos 49, 50, 57 Balloon Section

=== Deployment, 9 February ===
- General Headquarters at Bir Salem

7th Mounted Brigade at Deir el Belah
Imperial Service Cavalry Brigade at Herbieh
Imperial Camel Brigade at Rafa
20th Indian Brigade at Gaza

- Desert Mounted Corps at Kh. Deiran

Anzac Mounted Division at Richon le Zion (Ayun Kara)
Australian Mounted Division at Deir el Belah
Yeomanry Mounted Division at Deir el Belah

- XX Corps at Mount of Olives

10th (Irish) Division at O99, P.20.d. place not named.
53rd (Welsh) Division at Ram Allah
60th (London) Division at Jerusalem
74th (Yeomanry) Division at Latron

- XXI Corps at Jaffa

52nd (Lowland) Division at Jaffa and Sarona
54th (East Anglian) Division at Wilhelma
75th Division at Ramleh.

=== Shea's Force March ===
60th (London) Division
Anzac Mounted Division
Imperial Camel Corps Brigade including the Hong Kong and Singapore Mountain Battery, with four BL 2.75 inch Mountain Guns, (firing 12-pounder shells) :the 10th Heavy Battery Royal Garrison Artillery (RGA)
one Light Armoured Car Brigade
Army Bridging Train
Desert Mounted Corps Bridging Train and pontoon units. (Note: Blenkinsop refers to the 60th Indian Division but the Londoners did not leave for the Western Front until after the Second Transjordan attack.)

=== Order of Battle April ===
- Desert Mounted Corps (GOC Lieutenant General H. G. Chauvel)

60th (London) Division commanded by Major General John Shea (less the 181st Brigade in reserve on the XXth Corps front)

179th Brigade (Brigadier General FitzJ. M. Edwards)

2/13th London Regiment
2/14th London Regiment
2/15th London Regiment
2/16th London Regiment

180th Brigade (Brigadier General C. F. Watson)

2/17th London Regiment
2/18th London Regiment
2/19th London Regiment
2/20th London Regiment

Artillery 301st, 302nd, 303rd Brigades RFA

20th Indian Brigade (Brigadier General E. R. B. Murray)

Alwar Infantry (I.S.)
Patiala Infantry (I.S.)
Gwalior Infantry (I.S.)
110th Mahratta L. I. Regiment

Anzac Mounted Division (GOC Major General E. W. C. Chaytor)

2nd Light Horse Brigade (Brigadier General G. de L. Ryrie)

5th Light Horse Regiment
6th Light Horse Regiment
7th Light Horse Regiment

New Zealand Mounted Rifles Brigade (Brigadier General W. Meldrum)

Auckland Mounted Rifles Regiment
Canterbury Mounted Rifles Regiment
Wellington Mounted Rifles Regiment

Divisional Artillery XVIII Brigade RHA (Inverness-shire, Ayrshire and Somerset Batteries)

Australian Mounted Divisions (GOC Major General H. W. Hodgson)

1st Light Horse Brigade (Brigadier General C. F. Cox) (Anzac Mounted Division)

1st Light Horse Regiment
2nd Light Horse Regiment
3rd Light Horse Regiment

3rd Light Horse Brigade (Brigadier General L. C. Wilson)

8th Light Horse Regiment
9th Light Horse Regiment
10th Light Horse Regiment

4th Light Horse Brigade (Brigadier General W. Grant)

4th Light Horse Regiment
11th Light Horse Regiment
12th Light Horse Regiment

5th Mounted Brigade (Brigadier General P. J. V. Kelly)

1/1st Gloucester Yeomanry Regiment
1/1st Worcester Yeomanry Regiment
1/1st Sherwood Rangers Regiment (7th Mounted Yeomanry Brigade)

Divisional Artillery XIX Brigade RHA (Notts. Battery RHA, "A" and "B: Batteries HAC with Hong Kong Mountain Battery attached)

1/1st Dorset Yeomanry Regiment (6th Mounted Yeomanry Brigade)
1/1st County of London (Middlesex) Yeomanry Regiment (8th Mounted Yeomanry Brigade)

Imperial Service Cavalry Brigade

Jodhpur Lancers
Mysore Lancers
Hyderabad Lancers

11th and 12th Light Armoured Motor Batteries [LAMB] (Machine Gun Corps)

West of the Jordan

Imperial Camel Corps Brigade (Brigadier General C. L. Smith)

2nd (British) Battalion
3rd (Australian) Battalion
4th (ANZAC) Battalion

Artillery Singapore Mountain Battery less Hong Kong Mountain Battery

22nd Mounted Brigade (Brigadier General F. A. B. Fryer/Brigadier General P. D. FitzGerald)

1/1st Lincolnshire Yeomanry
1/1st Staffordshire Yeomanry
1/1st East Riding Yeomanry

=== Order of Battle 19 September ===
XX Corps (Lieutenant General Sir P. Chetwode)

53rd (Welsh) Division (Major General S. F. Mott)

158th Brigade (Brigadier General H. A. Vernon)

5/6th R. Welsh Fus., 4/11th Gurkhas, 3/153rd and 154th Indian Inf.

159th Brigade (Brigadier General N. Money)

4/5th Welsh Regt., 3/152nd, 1/153rd and 2/153rd Indian Inf.

160th Brigade (Brigadier General V. L. N. Pearson)

1/7th R. Welsh Fus., 1/17th Indian Inf., 1/21st Punjabis, 1st Cape Corps

265th, 266th, 267th Brigades RFA each with three batteries of twelve 18-pdrs. and four 4.5-inch hows.
39th Indian Mountain Battery
Troop Corps Cavalry Regiment (1/1st Worcester Yeomanry)

10th (Irish) Division (Major General J. R. Longley)

29th Brigade (Brigadier General C.L. Smith)

1st Leinsters, 1/101st Grenadiers, 1/54th Sikhs, 2/151st Infantry

30th Brigade (Brigadier General F. A. Greer)

1st Royal Irish Regt., 1st Kashmir I.S. Rifles, 38th Dogras, 46th Punjabis

31st Brigade (Brigadier General E. M. Morris)

2nd Royal Irish Fus., 2/101st Grenadiers, 74th Punjabis, 2/42nd Deolis

67th, 68th, 263rd Brigades RFA (67th and 68th Brigades with three batteries of twelve 18-pdrs. and four 4.5-inch hows.; 263rd Brigade with six 18-pdrs. and four 4.5-inch hows.)
Hong Kong and Singapore Mountain Battery

"Watson's Force" (holding centre of XX Corps' Front)

Corps Cavalry Regiment (1/1 Worcester Yeomanry)
Pioneer Battalions (2/155th and 1/155th) of 10th and 53rd Divisions
Corps Reinforcement Detachment (700 strong)

XX Corps Heavy Artillery

- For support of 53rd Division

103rd Brigade RGA
R. Section 10th Heavy Battery
L. Section 10th Heavy Battery
205th Siege Battery
387th Siege Battery (less 1 gun)
392nd Siege Battery

- For support of 10th Division

421st Siege Battery
397th Siege Battery (1 gun)
2 captured 15 cm hows.
2 captured 105 mm hows
3 captured 75 mm hows.

XXI Corps (Lieutenant General Sir E. Bulfin)

3rd (Lahore) Division (Major General A.R. Hoskins)

7th Brigade (Brigadier General S. R. Davidson)

1st Connaught Rngrs, 2/7th Gurkha Rifles, 27th and 91st Punjabis

8th Brigade (Brigadier General S. M. Edwardes)

1st Manchester Regt., 27th Sikhs, 59th Scinde Rifles, 2/124th Baluchistan Infantry

9th Brigade (Brigadier General C. C. Luard)

2nd Dorsets, 1/1st Gurkha Rifles, 93rd Infantry, 105th Mahratta Light Infantry

4th, 8th, 53rd Brigades RFA, each with twelve 18-pdrs. and four 4.5-inch hows.

7th (Meerut) Division (Major General Sir V. B. Fane)

19th Brigade (Brigadier General G. S. Weir)

1st Seaforth Highrs., 28th and 92nd Punjabis, 125th Napier's Rifles

21st Brigade (Brigadier General A. G. Kemball)

2nd Black Watch, 1st Guides Infantry, 20th Punjabis, 1/8th Gurkha Rifles

28th Brigade (Brigadier General C. H Davies)

2nd Leicesters, 51st and 53rd Sikhs, 56th Punjabi Rifles

261st, 262nd, 264th Brigades RFA, each with twelve 18-pds and four 4.5-inch hows.

54th (East Anglian) Division (Major General S. W. Hare)

161st (Essex) Brigade (Brigadier General A. B. Orpen Palmer)

1/4th, 1/5th, 1/6th and 1/7th Essex

162nd (East Midland) Brigade (Brigadier General A. Mudge)

1/5th Bedford, 1/4th Nothampton, 1/10th and 1/11th London

163rd (Norfolk and Suffolk) Brigade (Brigadier General A. J. MacNeill)

1/4th, 1/5th Norfolk, 1/5th Suffolk, 1/8th Hampshire

270th, 271st, 272nd Brigades RFA, each with twelve 18-pds and four 4.5-inch hows.

60th (London) Division (Major General Sir J. S. M. Shea)

179th Brigade (Brigadier General E. T. Humphreys)

2/13th London, 3/151st Infantry, 2/19th Punjabis, 2/137th Baluchis

180th Brigade (Brigadier General C. F. Watson)

2/19th London, 2nd Guides, 2/30th Punjabis, 1/50th Kumoan Rifles

181st Brigade (Brigadier General E. C. da Costa)

2/22nd London, 130th Baluchis, 2/97th Deccan Inf., 2/152nd Infantry.

75th Division (Major General P. C. Palin)

232nd Brigade (Brigadier General H. J. Huddleston)

1/4th Wilts, 72nd Punjabis, 2/3rd Gurkhas, 3rd Kashmir I.S. Infantry

233rd Brigade (Brigadier General E. M. Colston)

1/5th Somerset Light Infantry, 29th Punjabis, 3/3rd Gurkhas, 2/154th Infantry

234th Brigade (Brigadier General C. A. H. Maclean)

1/4th D.C.L.I., 123rd Outram Rifles, 58th Vaughan's Rifles, 1/152nd Infantry.

301st, 302nd 303rd Brigades RFA, each with twelve 18-pdrs. and four 4.5- hows.
Corps mounted troops (Composite Yeomanry Regiment)
5th Light Horse Brigade (under orders of 60th Division)
French Palestine Contingent (4 Bns and 3 Btys)

See also Battle of Arara#Deployment of 54th Division and DFPS

XXI Corps Heavy Artillery

- Sub-Group under the Right Group

4.7-inch Battery RGA
300 SB, RGA 6-inch Section
334 SB, RGA, One Section

- Right Group

100th Brigade, RGA, Headquarters –
15th HB, RGA
134 SB, RGA
334 SB, RGA One Section
43 SB, RGA "Bessie"

- Right Centre Group

95th Brigade, RGA Headquarters –
181 HB, RGA
304 SB, RGA
314 SB, RGA
383 SB, RGA
422 SB, RGA
5.9-inch Hows. Section.

- Left Centre Group

102nd Brigade, RGA Headquarters –
91 HB, RGA
209 SB, RGA
380 SB, RGA
440 SB, RGA
300 SB, RGA 8 inch Section
43 SB, RGA "Lizzie"

- Left Group

96th Brigade, RGA Headquarters –
189 HB, RGA
202 HB, RGA
378 SB, RGA
394 SB, RGA

Generally –

- The Sub-Group was in support of the French
- The Right Group was in support of the 54th Division
- The Right Centre Group was in support of the 3rd (Lahore) Division
- The Left Centre Group was in support of the 75th Division
- The Left Group was in support of the 60th Division.

Desert Mounted Corps (Lieutenant General Sir H. Chauvel)

4th Cavalry Division (Major General Sir G. de S. Barrow)

10th Cavalry Brigade (Brigadier General Wilfrith Gerald Key Green/Richard Howard-Vyse)

1/1 Dorset Yeomanry (ex 6th Mounted Brigade), 2nd Lancers, 38th Central India Horse (38th King George's Own Central India Horse)

11th Cavalry Brigade (Brigadier General Charles Levinge Gregory)

1/1st County of London Yeomanry (ex 8th Mounted Brigade), 29th Lancers, 36th Jacob's Horse

12th Cavalry Brigade (Brigadier General J. T. Wigan)

1/1Stafford Yeomanry (ex 22nd Mounted Brigade), 6th Cavalry, 19th Lancers

20th Brigade RHA and Divisional Ammunition Column
12th LAM Battery
No. 7 Light Car Patrol

5th Cavalry Division (Major General H. J. M. MacAndrew)

13th Cavalry Brigade (Brigadier General Philip James Vandeleur Kelly)

1/1 Gloucester Yeomanry (ex 5th Mounted Brigade), 9th Hodson's Horse, 18th Lancers

14th Cavalry Brigade (Brigadier General Goland Vanhalt Clarke)

1/1 Sherwood Rangers Yeomanry (ex 7th Mounted Brigade), 20th Deccan Horse, 34th Poona Horse

15th (Imperial Service) Cavalry Brigade (Brigadier General Cyril Rodney Harbord)

Jodhpur, Mysore and 1st Hyderabad Lancers [Regiments] (These regiments were all maintained by the Ruling Princes of their respective States in India.)

'B' Battery HAC and Essex Battery RHA with Divisional Ammunition Column
11th LAM Battery
No. 1 Light Car Patrol.

Australian Mounted Division (Major General H. W. Hodgson)

3rd Light Horse Brigade (Brigadier General L. C. Wilson)

8th, 9th, 10th Australian Light Horse Regiments

4th Light Horse Brigade (Brigadier General W. Grant)

4th, 11th 12th Light Horse Regiments

5th Light Horse Brigade (Brigadier General C. Macarthur Onslow) (attached XXI Corps till 22 September)

14th, 15th Light Horse Regiments (ex Imperial Camel Corps Brigade)
1er Régiment Mixte de Marche de Cavalerie du Levant

French Chasseurs d'Afrique (2 squadrons)
Spahis (1 squadron).

19th Brigade RHA.

Chaytor's Force (Major General E.W.C. Chaytor)

20th Indian Brigade

Four Indian Battalions
38th Battalion Royal Fusiliers (Jewish Battalion)
39th Battalion Royal Fusiliers (Jewish Battalion)

Anzac Mounted Division (Major General E.W.C. Chaytor)

1st Light Horse Brigade (Brigadier General C. F. Cox)

1st, 2nd and 3rd Light Horse Regiments
1st Battalion British West Indies Regiment

2nd Light Horse Brigade (Brigadier General G. de L. Ryrie)

5th, 6th and 7th Light Horse Regiments

New Zealand Mounted Rifle Brigade (Brigadier General W. Meldrum)

Auckland, Canterbury and Wellington Mounted Rifle Regiments
2nd Battalion British West Indies Regiment

18th Brigade RHA (Inverness-shire, Ayrshire and Somerset Batteries) and Divisional Ammunition Column
A/263 Battery RFA
195th Heavy Battery RGA
29th and 32nd Indian Mountain Batteries
No. 6 (Medium) Trench Mortar Battery
3 anti–aircraft sections RA
Detachment No. 35 AT Company RE.

== See also ==
- Sinai and Palestine campaign
- History of Palestine
- Postage stamps and postal history of Palestine

== Bibliography ==
- "General Staff General Headquarters Egyptian Expeditionary Force". Canberra: Australian War Memorial. February 1918.
- "General Staff Headquarters Anzac Mounted Division War Diary". Canberra: Australian War Memorial. December 1916. Archived from the original on 2011-03-21.
- "1st Light Horse Brigade War Diary". Canberra: Australian War Memorial. March 1917. Archived from the original on 2011-03-21.
- Bowman–Manifold, M. G. E. (1923). An Outline of the Egyptian and Palestine Campaigns, 1914 to 1918 (2nd ed.). Chatham: W. & J. Mackay for The Institution of Royal Engineers. OCLC 224893679.
- Bruce, Anthony (2002). The Last Crusade: The Palestine Campaign in the First World War. London: John Murray. ISBN 978-0-7195-5432-2.
- Carver, Michael, Field Marshal Lord (2003). The National Army Museum Book of The Turkish Front 1914–1918 The Campaigns at Gallipoli, in Mesopotamia and in Palestine. London: Pan Macmillan. ISBN 978-0-283-07347-2.
- Coulthard-Clark, Chris (1998). Where Australians Fought: The Encyclopaedia of Australia's Battles. St Leonards: Allen and Unwin. ISBN 1-86448-611-2.
- Cutlack, Frederic Morley (1941). The Australian Flying Corps in the Western and Eastern Theatres of War, 1914–1918. Official History of Australia in the War of 1914–1918. Vol. VIII (11th ed.). Canberra, ACT: Australian War Memorial. OCLC 220900299.
- Falls, Cyril; Becke, A. F. (maps) (1930). Military Operations Egypt & Palestine from June 1917 to the End of the War. Official History of the Great War Based on Official Documents by Direction of the Historical Section of the Committee of Imperial Defence. Vol. II. Part I. London: HMSO. OCLC 644354483.
- Falls, Cyril; Becke, A. F. (maps) (1930). Military Operations Egypt & Palestine from June 1917 to the End of the War. Official History of the Great War Based on Official Documents by Direction of the Historical Section of the Committee of Imperial Defence. Vol. II. Part II. London: HMSO. OCLC 256950972.
- Gullett, Henry S. (1941). The Australian Imperial Force in Sinai and Palestine, 1914–1918. Official History of Australia in the War of 1914–1918. Vol. VII (11th ed.). Canberra: Australian War Memorial. OCLC 220900153.
- Jones, Ian (1987). Australians at War: The Australian Light Horse. North Sydney: Time-Life Books (Australia). OCLC 255503233.
- Keogh, E. G.; Graham, J. (1955). Suez to Aleppo. Melbourne: Directorate of Military Training by Wilkie. OCLC 220029983.
- McGuirk, Russell (2007). The Sanusi's Little War: The Amazing Story of a Forgotten Conflict in the Western Desert, 1915–1917. London: Arabian Publishing. OCLC 156803398.
- Massey, William T. (1920). Allenby's Final Triumph. London: Constable. OCLC 345306.
- Powles, C. Guy; Wilkie, A. (1922). The New Zealanders in Sinai and Palestine. Official History New Zealand's Effort in the Great War. Vol. III. Auckland: Whitcombe & Tombs. OCLC 2959465.
- Preston, R. M. P. (1921). The Desert Mounted Corps: An Account of the Cavalry Operations in Palestine and Syria 1917–1918. London: Constable. OCLC 3900439.
- Wavell, Field Marshal Earl (1968) [1933]. "The Palestine Campaigns". In Sheppard, Eric William (ed.). A Short History of the British Army (4th ed.). London: Constable. OCLC 35621223.
- Woodward, David R. (2006). Hell in the Holy Land: World War I in the Middle East. Lexington: The University Press of Kentucky. ISBN 978-0-8131-2383-7.
