= 1/1st Staffordshire Yeomanry =

- Active: 31 August 1914–December 1919
- Country: United Kingdom
- Branch: Territorial Force
- Type: Yeomanry
- Role: Cavalry
- Size: Regiment
- Part of: North Midland Mounted Brigade; Yeomanry Mounted Division; 4th Cavalry Division
- Garrison/HQ: Friars' Walk drill hall, Stafford
- Engagements: Battles of Gaza; Battle of Mughar Ridge; Battle of Nebi Samwil; Battle of Megiddo; Capture of Damascus

Commanders
- Notable commanders: Sir William Bromley-Davenport

The 1/1st Staffordshire Yeomanry was an active service cavalry unit formed by the Staffordshire Yeomanry (Queen's Own Royal Regiment) during World War I. It was sent to the Mediterranean in 1915 and after several changes of plan it arrived in Egypt, where it served with the Western Frontier Force. Later, it participated in the Sinai and Palestine campaign, including the battles of Gaza, Mughar Ridge and Nebi Samwil, the decisive Battle of Megiddo and the Capture of Damascus. It remained in Palestine on security duties for some months before being demobilised.

== Mobilisation ==
When war was declared on 4 August 1914, the Staffordshire Yeomanry, a mounted regiment of Britain's Territorial Force (TF), mobilised at Stafford under Lieutenant-Colonel William Bromley-Davenport, its commander since 1910. The regiment assembled with the North Midland Mounted Brigade (NMMB) and went with it to its war station at Diss in Norfolk, where the brigade came under 1st Mounted Division in September.

The part-time TF was intended to be a home defence force in wartime, and its members could not be compelled to serve overseas. However, on 10 August 1914, the TF was invited to volunteer for overseas service and the majority did so. On 15 August, the War Office issued instructions to separate those men who had signed up for Home Service only, and form these into reserve units. On 31 August, the formation of a reserve or 2nd Line unit was authorised for each 1st Line unit where 60 per cent or more of the men had volunteered for Overseas Service. The titles of these 2nd Line units would be the same as the original, but distinguished by a '2/' prefix. In this way duplicate regiments, brigades and divisions were created, mirroring the 1st Line TF formations being sent overseas. Later, the 2nd Line was prepared for overseas service, and a 3rd Line was formed to act as a reserve, providing trained replacements for the 1st and 2nd Line regiments.

== Service ==
While in East Anglia the 1st Mtd Division was part of the defence forces for the East Coast, but at the same time its units and formations were training for active service. One by one its 1st Line mounted brigades embarked for overseas service and were replaced by the 2nd Line. The turn of the 1/1st NMMB came on 30 September 1915 when it was ordered to re-equip and reorganise to full war establishment (it was replaced in the division by 2/1st NMMB). By now 1/1st Staffordshire Yeomanry was commanded by Lt-Col Henry Clowes, who had been second-in-command of the regiment on the outbreak of war.

On 26 October Lt-Col Clowes, Major Viscount Lewisham and nine other officers went to Devonport to embark on HM Transport Northland as an advance party sent to Mudros, the base for the Gallipoli campaign. Eleven men and 11 mules of the regiment also embarked with the 1/1st East Riding Yeomanry (1/1st ERY) on HMT Victorian. The rest of the regiment entrained at Norwich for Southampton and sailed next day aboard HMT Nessian with 16 officers and 501 other ranks (ORs). The convoy was heading for Malta, but when it passed Gibraltar on 2 November it was ordered to proceed to the Salonika front and steamed past Malta. Then on 6 November it received orders by wireless to re-route to Alexandria in Egypt. It disembarked there on 9 November, the advance party who had travelled via Mudros rejoining on 22 November.

=== Western Frontier ===
On 23 November the regiment moved by train to Cairo and then on 28 November, also by train, it went to Faiyum, 60 miles (97 km) south west of Cairo, where 1/1st NMMB became part of the Western Frontier Force (WFF). The Senussi had just invaded Egypt from Libya and 1/1st NMMB's role was to keep order in the Faiyum Oasis area and also to block the desert route to the Nile. 1/1st Staffordshire Yeomanry was stationed at Deir al Azab Camp with one Troop on outpost duty every night. From here it carried out patrols and route marches throughout the area. 1/1st North Midland Mounted Brigade was numbered as 22nd Mounted Brigade in March 1916.

When Lt-Col Clowes died in hospital on 8 March, Lt-Col Bromley-Davenport took over, but five days later he was promoted to Temporary Brigadier-General to command 22nd Mounted Bde. Major Sir Percival Heywood, 4th Baronet, was promoted to command 1/1st Staffs Yeomanry. A number of men from 1/1st Staffs Yeomanry volunteered to serve with the Imperial Camel Corps at this time, and on 12 June the regiment received a draft of reinforcements from 3/1st Staffs Yeomanry at Aldershot. The regiment continued its patrol work, squadrons being moved around the area as required. On 11 October it was moved to the WFF's outpost line, the on 1 November it returned to Deir al Azab.

=== Gaza ===
By the end of 1916 the Senussi threat had receded, and the Egyptian Expeditionary Force (EEF) called in the yeomanry brigades as it was preparing for the Sinai and Palestine campaign. 1/1st Staffs Yeomanry entrained at Faiyum on 2 December and moved to Qantara, the EEF's base on the Suez Canal. From there it marched to Romani, near the Sinai coast, where standing patrols were established. By early 1917 the EEF's advance into Sinai had begun, 1/1st Staffs Yeomanry moved up to Bir al-Abd on 19 January, and then spent a month marching in stages along the coast to arrive at Sheikh Zuweid on 23 February. 22nd Mounted Bde (now commanded by T/Brig-Gen F. A. B. Fryer) now formed part of the Australian and New Zealand Mounted Division in the Desert Column.

At Sheikh Zuweid 1/1st Staffs Yeomanry was assigned to the outposts, and on 1 March its men entrenched an observation post on 'Fryer's Hill'. On 4 March it took part with the 1/1st Lincolnshire Yeomanry, the brigade machine gun squadron and 7th Australian Light Horse in a reconnaissance in force towards Khan Yunis and Bei Sela, where it came under fire for the first time, from Turkish artillery. On 10 March the regiment moved up to Bir Eshsha, near Rafah from where two days later it carried out another reconnaissance up to Weli Sheikh Nuran and the Wadi Ghuzzee. The rest of the EEF now followed, and by midnight on 25 March had closed up to the Wadi Ghuzzee with the Anzac Mtd Division at Deir al-Balah, ready to attack Gaza City.

The First Battle of Gaza was launched at 02.30 on 26 March when the Anzac Mdt Division left its bivouacs at Deir al-Balah and moved 4.5 miles (7.2 km) east across the rear of the EEF to a previously-prepared crossing of the Wadi Ghuzzee. Here it was ready to envelop the city while the infantry attacked frontally. The 2nd Light Horse Brigade crossed at 04.50 and then advanced at a smart pace to Beit Durdis, which it reached soon after 09.00, followed by the New Zealand Mounted Rifles Brigade and 22nd Mtd Bde. The 1/1st Staffs Yeomanry was shelled as it crossed the wadi. As the 2nd LH Bde continued to the north west, the NZMRB concentrated at Beit Durdis and pushed out patrols to Huj while 22nd Mtd Bde formed up to its south. However, the infantry attack had been delayed by thick fog: by noon it looked like they could not complete the capture of Gaza by nightfall. The Anzac Mtd Division was therefore ordered to attack from the east. All three brigades had reached the outskirts by dusk, the 22nd Mtd Bde advancing at a gallop along the track from Beit Durdis. However, there was a shortage of water for the horses and Turkish reinforcements were arriving. The Desert Column was ordered to break off the action and withdraw to the Wadi Ghuzzee. This was a confused affair, but the Anzac Mtd Division passed Beit Durdis at 02.00 on 27 March. Once back across the wadi 22nd Mtd Bde was sent across to the coast to relieve the troops in the sand dunes. 1/1st Staffs Yeomanry manned the outpost line to the sea until it was relieved and rejoined the rest of the division on 29 March.

The EEF immediately began preparing a new attack (the Second Battle of Gaza). The first phase began on 17 April with a demonstration by the Anzac Mtd Division, followed next day by a bombardment. The EEF's infantry attacked on 19 April, with the Desert Column's mounted troops pinning the Turks in the east. 22nd Mounted Bde's role was to hold the right on the Wadi Ghuzzee and cover the Royal Engineers working to develop water supplies in the wadi. During the day Anzac Mtd Division had to fight off Turkish counter-attacks, and 22nd Mtd Bde was engaged by cavalry and infantry from the direction of Beersheba. Once again the main infantry attack on Gaza failed, and the fighting died down that night, the EEF digging in where it stood.

The summer months saw little action. On 22 May the Anzac Mtd Division raided the Beersheba–Auja railway, after which 1/1st Staffs Yeomanry moved to Tel el Marrakeb on the beach for a rest. In July 1917 the Desert Column was broken up into three mounted divisions under the Desert Mounted Corps (DMC), with the yeomanry brigades constituting a new Yeomanry Mounted Division (YMD) at Khan Yunis. General Sir Edmund Allenby had now taken command of the EEF, and intensive preparations were made for a renewal of the offensive in the autumn.

=== Beersheba ===
Allenby planned to attack again at Gaza, this time using the DMC on a wider sweep to capture Beersheba, with its water supplies, before moving against the Turkish flank. The DMC began moving into position on 21 October, with the YMD marching from the coast to the inland flank, moving mostly by night. Although the corps encountered some opposition, it was in position for the opening of the attack on 31 October. The Third Battle of Gaza began with the Capture of Beersheba, for which the YMD was in GHQ Reserve and was not engaged. It then returned to the DMC for the Capture of the Sheria Position on 6 November, supporting the dismounted yeomanry of 74th (Yeomanry) Division. The YMD then held the positions captured in the hills north of Beersheba while the rest of the DMC was launched through the broken Turkish positions. On the morning of 8 November it was ordered to rejoin the DMC as quickly as possible to help complete the destruction of the Turkish garrison of Gaza. It reached newly-captured Huj on 9 November, where it watered its horses, and carried on next day, relieving the Anzac units exhausted in the pursuit. It continued towards the coast, where the EEF was concentrating for its next advance.

=== Mughar Ridge ===
On 13 November the YMD participated in the Battle of Mughar Ridge, with 22nd Mtd Bde ordered to advance to 'Aqir after the other brigades had captured the intervening villages. The brigade went forward at a canter in extended order. The 1/1st ERY was ordered to secure Mughar Ridge itself, and when they reached the crest the leading squadron saw the slopes beyond full of Turks running towards 'Aqir. Unable to contact superiors, the leading squadron commanders (two of 1/1st ERY, one of Staffs Yeomanry) agreed to try to seize 'Aqir and cut off the Turks by a converging attack. They were brought to a halt by an ambush set by the headquarters personnel of a Turkish corps, and the opportunity was lost. As night was falling, the commanding officers of the ERY and Staffs Yeomanry decided to hold the position on the ridge. On 15 November the YMD was ordered to capture the Abu Shushe Ridge: 22nd Mtd Bde attacked from the north-west. It cantered forward for 2 miles (3.2 km)in order to cross the fireswept zone quickly, then made its final attack on the crest dismounted. It found the northern section of the ridge already evacuated, but the fire of the 1/1st Staffs Yeomanry's rifles and Hotchkiss machine guns inflicted heavy losses on the feeling Turks.

=== Nebi Samwil ===
The EEF then followed the Turks eastwards into the Judaean Hills in the Battle of Nebi Samwil. Leaving its wheeled transport behind, the YMD advanced by terrible roads on 18 November, with 22nd Mtd Bde reaching Shilta. Next day it made slow progress towards 'Ain 'Arik, moving in single file along the road, with flanking parties to 'crown the heights' on either side, though there was little opposition. The brigade finally bivouacked just short of its objective, where rations had to be brought up by pack animals. On 20 November the brigade struggled into 'Ain 'Arik in heavy rain, leading its horses, the head of the column entering the village at 14.00 but the tail not arriving until about 22.00 that night. From 'Ain 'Arik two squadrons of 1/1st Staffs Yeomanry pushed on towards Ramallah, establishing themselves on the hill of El Muntar. These were the most advanced troops of the DMC, 6 miles (9.7 km) ahead of the infantry of XXI Corps, but still 2.5 miles (4.0 km) short of cutting the Nablus road into Jerusalem. Next day the brigade continued towards Ramallah, but Turkish reinforcements arrived and the brigade was ordered to withdraw, which took hours, the yeomen having to lead their horses over rocky ground. The division was unable to achieve much on 22 November and the wounded without tents or bivouacs suffered terribly from the weather. On 23 November it remained on the defensive under the command of XXI Corps, sending back all the horses except those of the machine gun sections, because of the shortage of water and forage. Apart from a demonstration on 24 November, the dismounted division remained in position for several days.

When the Turkish counter-attacks began on 27 November the exhausted and depleted YMD could only muster about 800 rifles. 22nd Mounted Bde was on the left between Foqa and Tahta, facing north. 6th Mounted Brigade was driven out of Foqa after a fierce fight. When the Turks renewed the attack at daybreak on 298 November the 1/1st Staffs Yeomanry and 1/1st ERY, forming a composite unit under Lt-Col the Hon Guy Wilson of the ERY, were holding the high ground NNW of Foqa to cover the left of the 6th Mtd Bde. There was a 1.5 miles (2.4 km) gap to the 1/1st Lincs Yeomanry at Tahta, then another 5 miles (8.0 km) gap to the nearest outpost of 54th (East Anglian) Division over rough and trackless country. Luckily the 7th Mounted Brigade had been marching through the night, and its squadrons were fed in to plug holes in the firing line. The Turks were still threatening the flank of 22nd and 7th Mtd Bdes, but reinforcements arrived from 52nd (Lowland) Division. The Turks got some mountain howitzers into action and shelled the yeomanry's horse lines in the rear: with too few horseholders to control them, the animals broke loose and the valley was filled with horses dashing around. By the end of the day the yeomanry had given up a few outlying villages, but with their reinforcements they still held a defensive line, which they consolidated that night. The line was hard pressed during the night by further attacks, but the YMD was relieved next day.

=== Jordan Valley ===
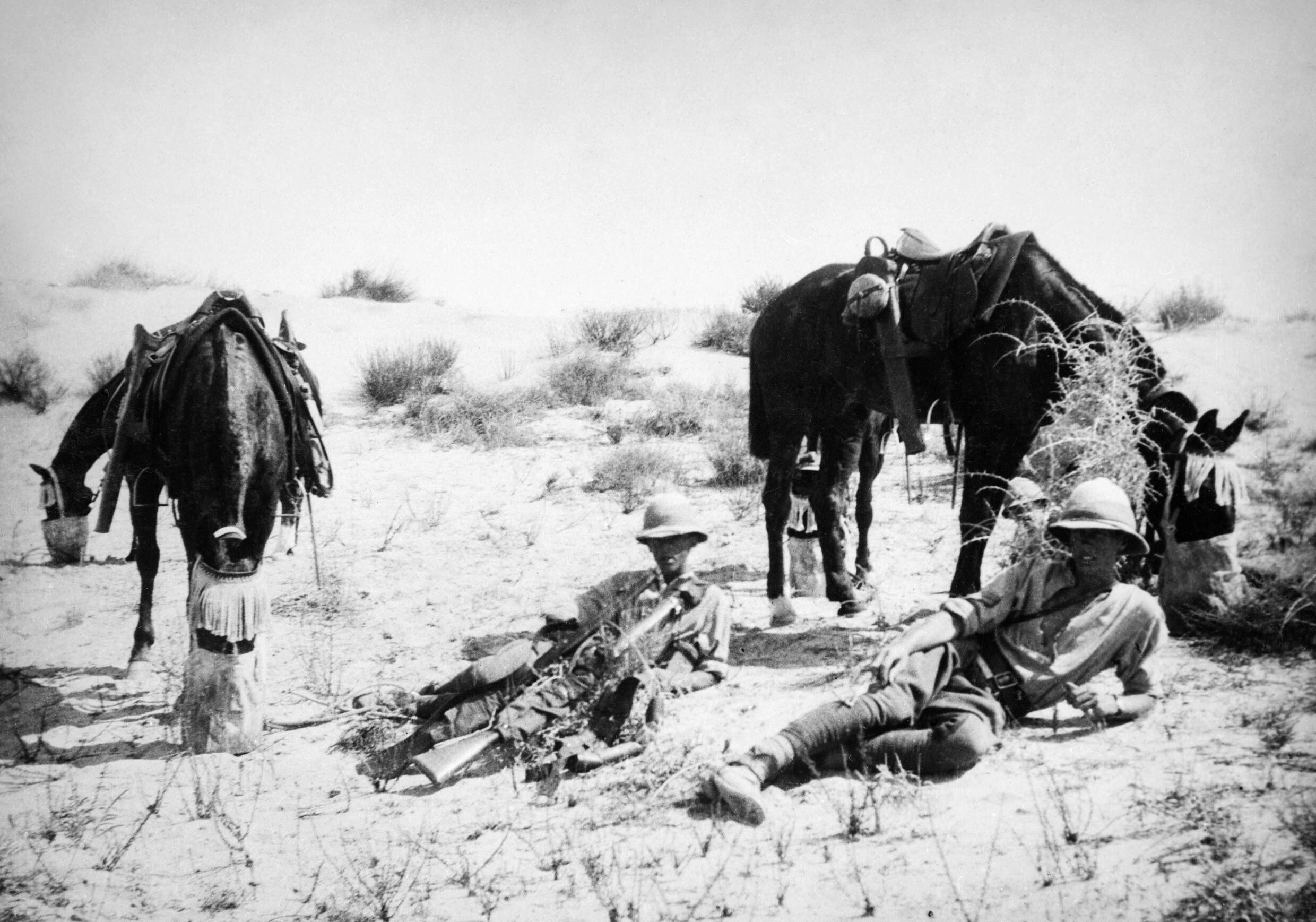
Yeomanry on patrol in the desert, 1918.

By late March 1918 the EEF had occupied the Jordan Valley and began a series of raids across the river. The YMD was undergoing a major reorganisation, but while this was being carried out the 1/1st Staffs Yeomanry was detached and on 1 April began a march from its bivouac area via Jerusalem and Jericho into the valley. It arrived at Wadi Auja on 27 April, where it was attached to the Imperial Camel Brigade (ICB), which was defending the northern flank of the Ghoraniyeh bridgehead across the Jordan. From here the 1/1st Staffs Yeomanry carried out a patrol into Wadi Bakr where it came under shellfire but without suffering any casualties. For the Second Transjordan Raid, the ICB continued to block any Turkish advance down the valley towards the bridgehead, and during the action at Es-Salt on 30 April it pushed troops up to the west bank of the Jordan near Umm esh Shert. That evening it was ordered to advance and destroy a Turkish pontoon bridge across the river next morning (1 May), but the Turks and Germans had already crossed and their expected counter-attack came in early in the morning against the flank of the troops on the east bank. The Australian Mounted Division was driven in, and over the next two days the raiding force had to be withdrawn or face being cut off from its bridgeheads. The ICB maintained its position on the west bank. On 14 May the 1/1st Staffs Yeomanry was repositioned along the Jordan between Ghoraniyeh and the Dead Sea, then moved on 25 May to north of Jericho. On 24 May it moved back into the Wadi Auja bridgehead, where it was shelled by a long-range gun.

Meanwhile the German spring offensive led to an urgent call for the EEF to send reinforcements to the Western Front. From 12 April 1918 the EEF's mounted units were reorganised, with two-thirds of the Yeomanry Mounted Division being converted into battalions of the Machine Gun Corps and sent to the Western Front. The rest of the division was 'Indianised', each brigade now consisting of one British yeomanry regiment of the TF and two cavalry regiments of the Indian Army, under the designation of 1st Mounted Division from 24 April. 22nd Mounted Bde was to consist of 1/1st Staffordshire Yeomanry serving alongside the 6th King Edward's Own Cavalry and the 19th Lancers (Fane's Horse), both regiments brought from 1st Indian Cavalry Division on the Western Front. The ICB was also disbanded, being converted into an Australian Light Horse brigade. 1/1st Staffs Yeomanry returned from the Jordan Valley to Solomon Pools at Bethlehem on 19 July. On 22 July 22nd Mtd Bde was renumbered 12th Cavalry Brigade and next day the 1st Mtd Division became 4th Cavalry Division.

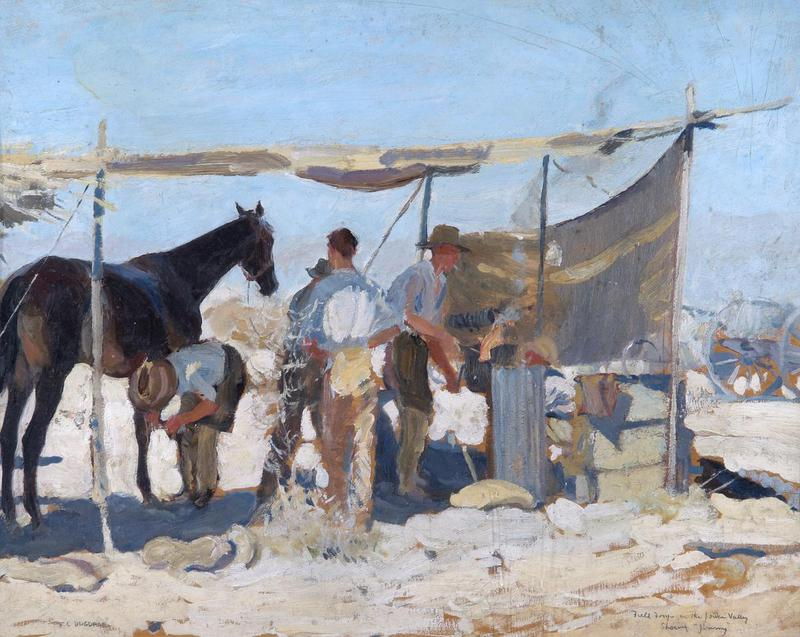
Shoeing Under Difficulties: Yeomanry of 4th Cavalry Division shoeing a horse in the Jordan Valley, summer 1918, by Thomas Cantrell Dugdale.

The reorganised 4th Cavalry Division then undertook a tour of duty in the malarial Jordan Valley during the height of summer. On 1 August 1/1st Staffs Yeomanry was at Wadi Mellalah, carrying out many patrols with several firefights and experiencing much sniping. By 16 August it had returned to the junction of the Wadi Auja and the River Jordan. The division was relieved at the end of the month, and 1/1st Staffs Yeomanry went back to Wadi Surar in the hills. The regiment's sickness during the month was abnormally high, with 7 officers and 166 other ranks being evacuated, leaving it with a strength of 19 officers and 363 other ranks, with 466 horses and mules (which stood the heat better than their riders).

=== Megiddo ===
The EEF spent the summer months preparing for its next offensive, the Battle of Megiddo. The DMC was moved west to the coast in readiness for the coming attack: on 15 September the 1/1st Staffs Yeomanry carried out a concealed night march via Yebnah to Ramla. 4th Cavalry Division was then concentrated and concealed in the orange groves east of Sarona, where the horses were watered at the irrigation ditches. On the night of 18/19 September the division assembled north of Selme to make a pre-dawn advance to Jlil, watering their horses at the River 'Auja on the way. The cavalry off-saddled and fed their horses while the infantry attacked the Tabsor trench system, and then at 08.40 the division was given permission to pass through. The opening attack (the Battle of Sharon) had been so successful that they met no opposition: 4th Cavalry Division advanced in three brigade columns, with 12th Bde on the right advancing straight to Jelame where they were able to water the horses once more. The division was now about 12 miles (19 km) behind the Turkish lines, and it continued advancing and rounding up prisoners until 20.00 that night when it was around Kerkur. Two of the brigades missing their way in the dark, 12th Bde was ordered to lead the division on to El Lajjun through the Musmus Pass. It set off at 01.10 on 20 September, reaching El Lajjun at 04.05, beyond which the Indian cavalry scattered a Turkish force that was just too late to block the exit of the pass. The division then went on to the Capture of Afulah and Beisan, taking hundreds of prisoners. It had covered 70 miles (110 km) in 34 hours, but the horses could now be rested while the transport and ammunition column caught up.

=== Pursuit to Damascus ===
The EEF was now preparing to pursue the defeated Turkish forces across Syria. After four days' rest the DMC was relieved by infantry and moved off again, the 4th Cavalry Division heading towards Deraa. Fighting against some Turkish rearguards, it reached Irbid on 26 September, with 12th Bde bivouacking at Esh Shuni, 2.5 miles (4.0 km) east of the Jordan. Next day the brigade marched to the Wadi esh Shelale, where the division rendezvoused, and at noon on 28 September it reached Deraa, which the Allied Arab Northern Army had entered the day before. 12th Brigade was then diverted to Muzeirib to water its horses. On 29 September the division marched up the Pilgrims' Road and bivouacked at Dilli. By now it was almost out of food, having left its camel and motor transport far behind, and was living off the country. On 30 September the tired horsemen reached Zerikiye. Next day the DMC and Arab Army surrounded and captured Damascus, 4th Cavalry Division approaching up the Pilgrims' Road from the south. Since 15 September the 1/1st Staffs Yeomanry had marched 233 miles (375 km) and captured 3069 prisoners.

The DMC had a week's rest after the fall of Damascus. However, admissions to hospital rose sharply, particularly among 4th Cavalry Division, which had spent the summer in the malarial Jordan Valley. The Spanish flu epidemic also appeared at this time. When the 1/1st Staffs Yeomanry began the 200 miles (320 km) advance to Aleppo, it was down to 75 fit men, with 200 in hospital, many of whom died. Despite the sickness, 4th Cavalry Division was pushed on through Baalbek and Homs, reaching Lebwe on 16 October, but it could not keep up with the rest of the DMC, which captured Aleppo on 26 October. Hostilities ended on 31 October when the Armistice of Mudros came into effect.

== Postwar ==
1/1st Staffordshire Yeomanry remained at Lebwe for several weeks, then on 29 November it moved to An Sofar, and next day to Bir Hassan, 30 miles (48 km) south of Beirut. 4th Cavalry Division had been selected to be part of the Allied Army of Occupation of Palestine and Syria, and 1/1st Staffs Yeomanry spent the next few months at Bir Hassan. Here demobilisation of the longest-serving men got under way.

1/1st Staffordshire Yeomanry was reduced to a cadre in Egypt on 19 December 1919 and later disembodied. The Staffordshire Yeomanry was reformed in the Territorial Force (later Territorial Army) on 7 February 1920. In World War II it served as a cavalry regiment in Palestine once more in 1940–41, and later as an armoured regiment in North Africa and in North West Europe from D-Day onwards.

The regiment was awarded the following Battle honours in recognition of the service of the 1/1st Staffordshire Yeomanry: Egypt 1915–17, Gaza, El Mughar, Nebi Samwil, Megiddo, Sharon, Damascus, Palestine 1917–18.
