= Shilat =

Moshav in Israel and the Latrun salient

Shilat: שִׁילָּת (Hebrew)
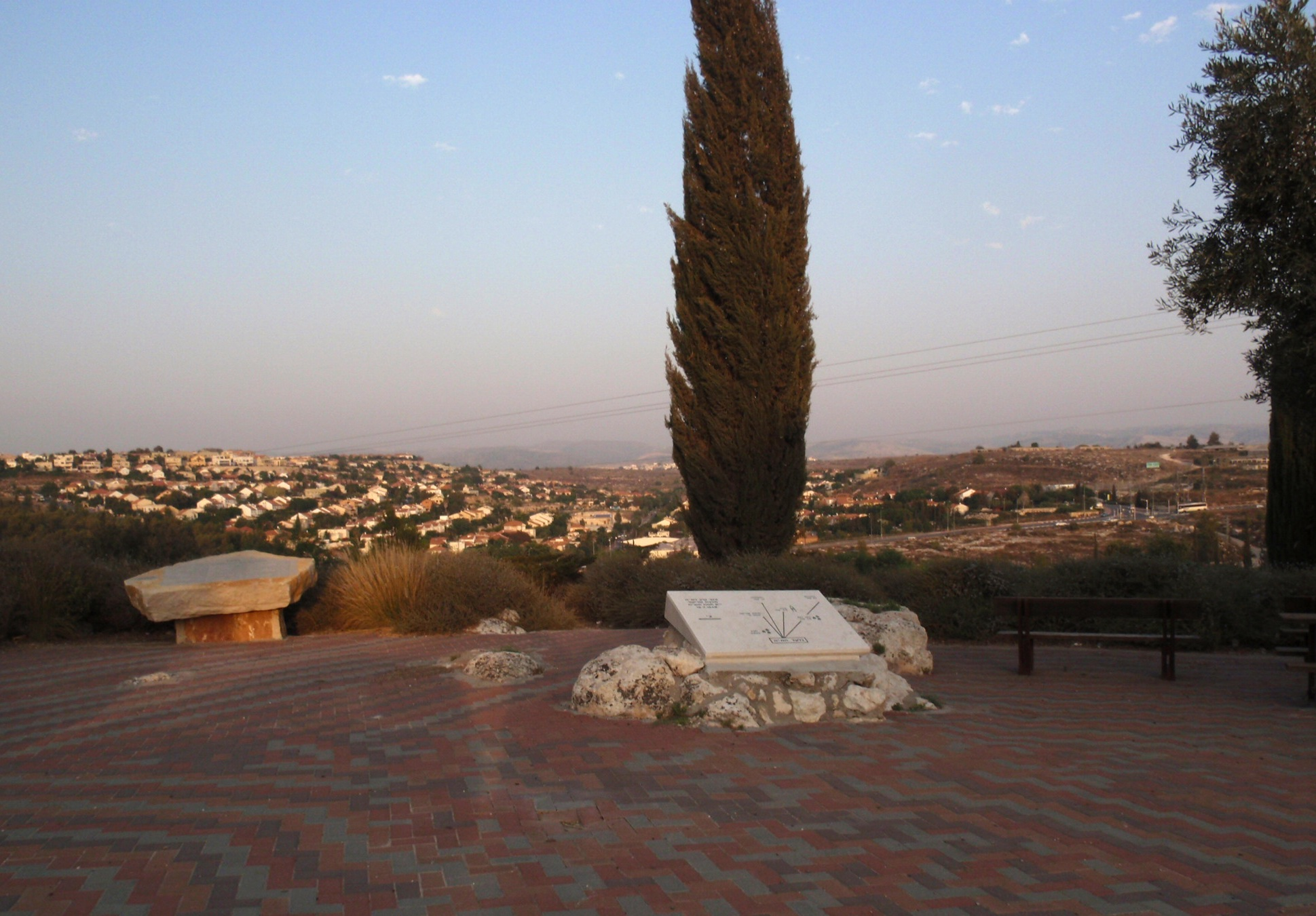
- Memorial to 45 fallen soldiers

- Location within Central Israel
- Coordinates: 31°55′13″N 35°1′7″E
- Country: Israel
- District: Central
- Subdistrict: Ramla
- Council: Hevel Modi'in
- Affiliation: HaOved HaTzioni
- Founded: July 1977
- Founder: HaOved HaTzioni farmers
- Population (2024): 838
- Website: www.shilat.co.il

Shilat (Hebrew: שִׁילָּת) is a moshav partially in Israel and partially in the Latrun salient of the Green Line. Located around a kilometre north of Modi'in, it falls under the jurisdiction of Hevel Modi'in Regional Council. In 2024 it had a population of 838.

The Shilat Junction, at the intersection of Route 443 and Route 446, is the main northern entrance to Modi'in and the site of an industrial park which houses many commercial establishments as well as light industry.

== History ==
The moshav was established in July 1977 by 25 families on land located near the Palestinian village of Shilta, which was depopulated in 1948. According to the ARIJ, after the Six-Day War in 1967, Israel expropriated 781 dunams of land from the Palestinian village of Saffa for the construction of Shilat.
