= Shilta =

Shiltah شلتة
- Village
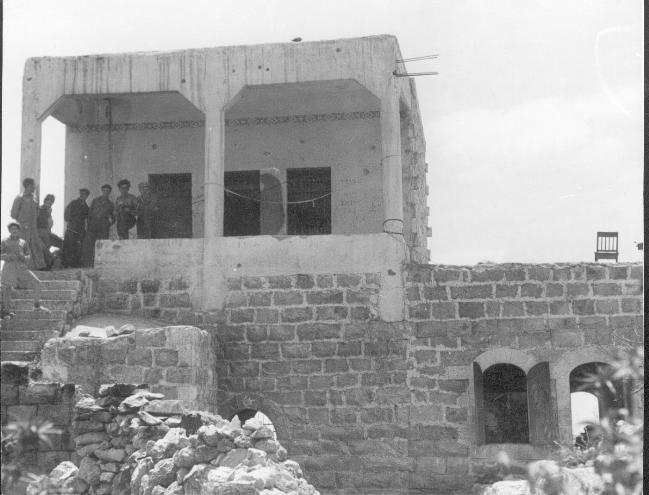
- Members of the Yiftach Brigade in Shiltah during Operation Danny. 1948
- Etymology: Shilta, from personal name
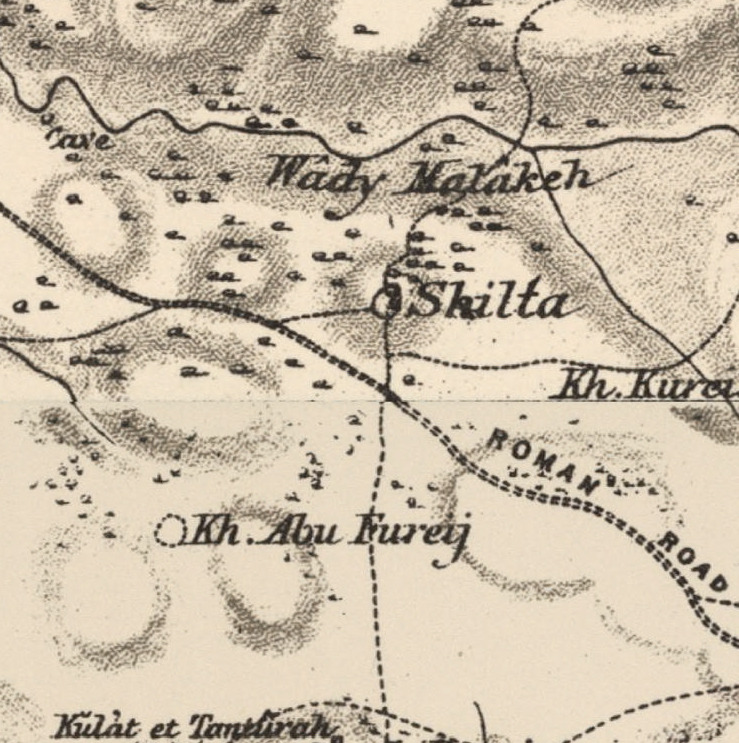
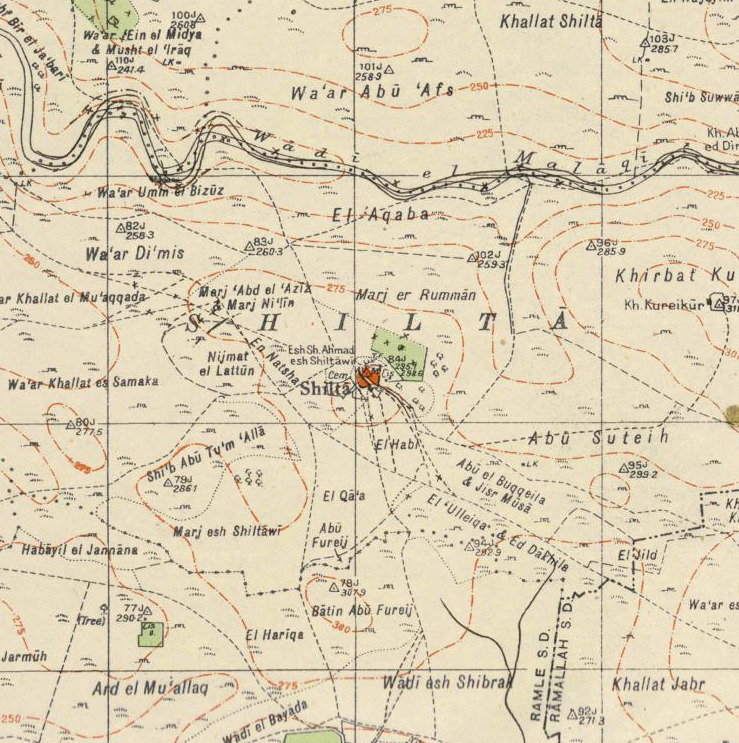
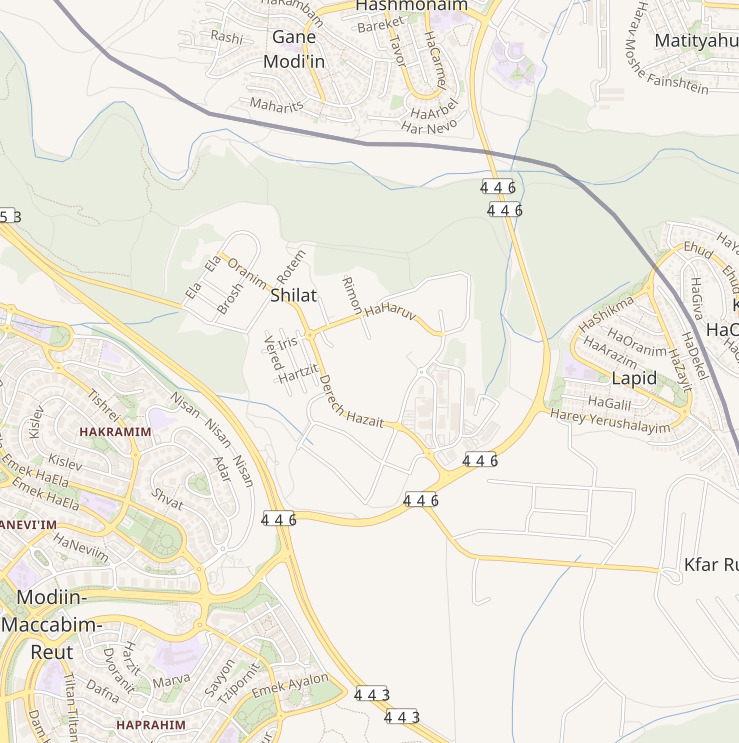
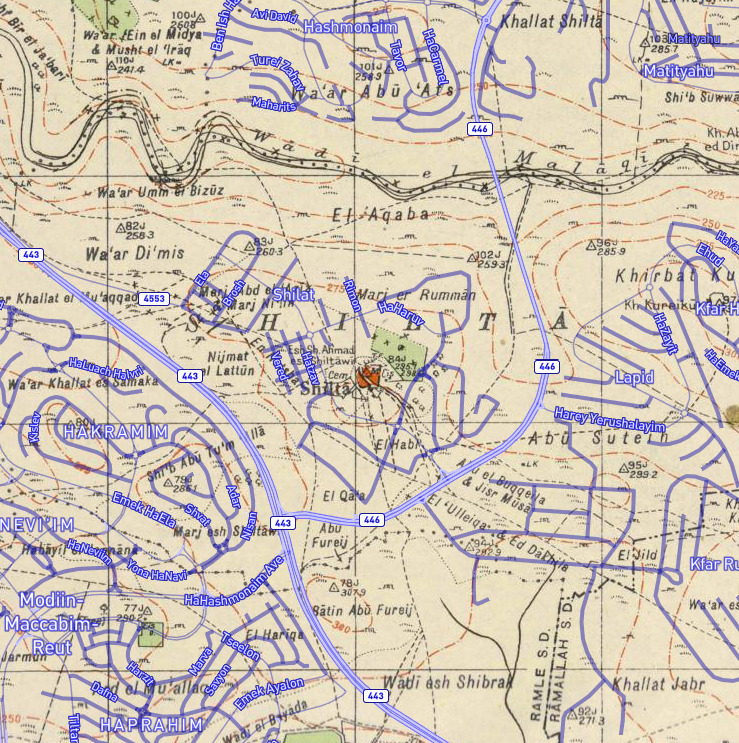
- 1870s map 1940s map modern map 1940s with modern overlay map A series of historical maps of the area around Shilta (click the buttons)

- Location within Mandatory Palestine
- Coordinates: 31°55′04″N 35°01′14″E
- Palestine grid: 152/147
- Geopolitical entity: Mandatory Palestine
- Subdistrict: Ramle
- Date of depopulation: July 15–16, 1948

Population (1945)
  - Total: 100
- Cause(s) of depopulation: Military assault by Yishuv forces
- Current Localities: Shilat Kfar Ruth

Shilta was a Palestinian Arab village in the Ramle Subdistrict of Mandatory Palestine. Sitting on a hill, It was probably settled in the 19th century. It was depopulated during the 1948 Arab–Israeli War on July 18, 1948, by the First Battalion of the Yiftach Brigade in the Operation Danny. It was located 15 km east of Ramla.

== Etymology ==
The name is of Aramaic origins. During the Crusader era the place was called Kefrscilta or Capharscylta.

== History ==
=== Persian to Mamluk periods ===
Shards from the Persian, Hellenistic, Roman, Byzantine periods have been found here, and possible shards from the Umayyad, Abbasid and the Crusader periods. Shards from the Mamluk period have also been found, though Finkelstein label this find questionable.

=== Ottoman period ===
The village likely saw settlement during the 19th century, given its absence from the Early Ottoman defter.

In 1870, Victor Guérin visited and noted that the village was "reduced to a few houses, it succeeded an ancient locality, as is proved by several cisterns dug in the middle of a rocky platform flattened by the man's hand, and a number of stones scattered here and there or embedded in Muslim buildings."

An Ottoman village list from about the same year showed that Schi’ra had 13 houses and a population of 41, though the population count included men, only. It was noted that it was located east of Jimzu.

By the beginning of the 20th century, residents from Kharbatha Bani Harith settled the site, establishing it as a dependency – or satellite village – of their home village.

=== British Mandate ===
According to a census conducted in 1931 by the British Mandate authorities, Shilta had a population of 22 inhabitants, in 7 houses.

The village had a mosque at the north end of the village, and there was a shrine of Shayk Ahmad al Shiltawi near it.

In the 1945 statistics, the village had a population of 100 Muslims, with a total of 5,380 dunums of land. Of this, 27 dunams were used for plantations and irrigable land, 2,159 dunums were used for cereals, while 6 dunams were classified as built-up public areas.

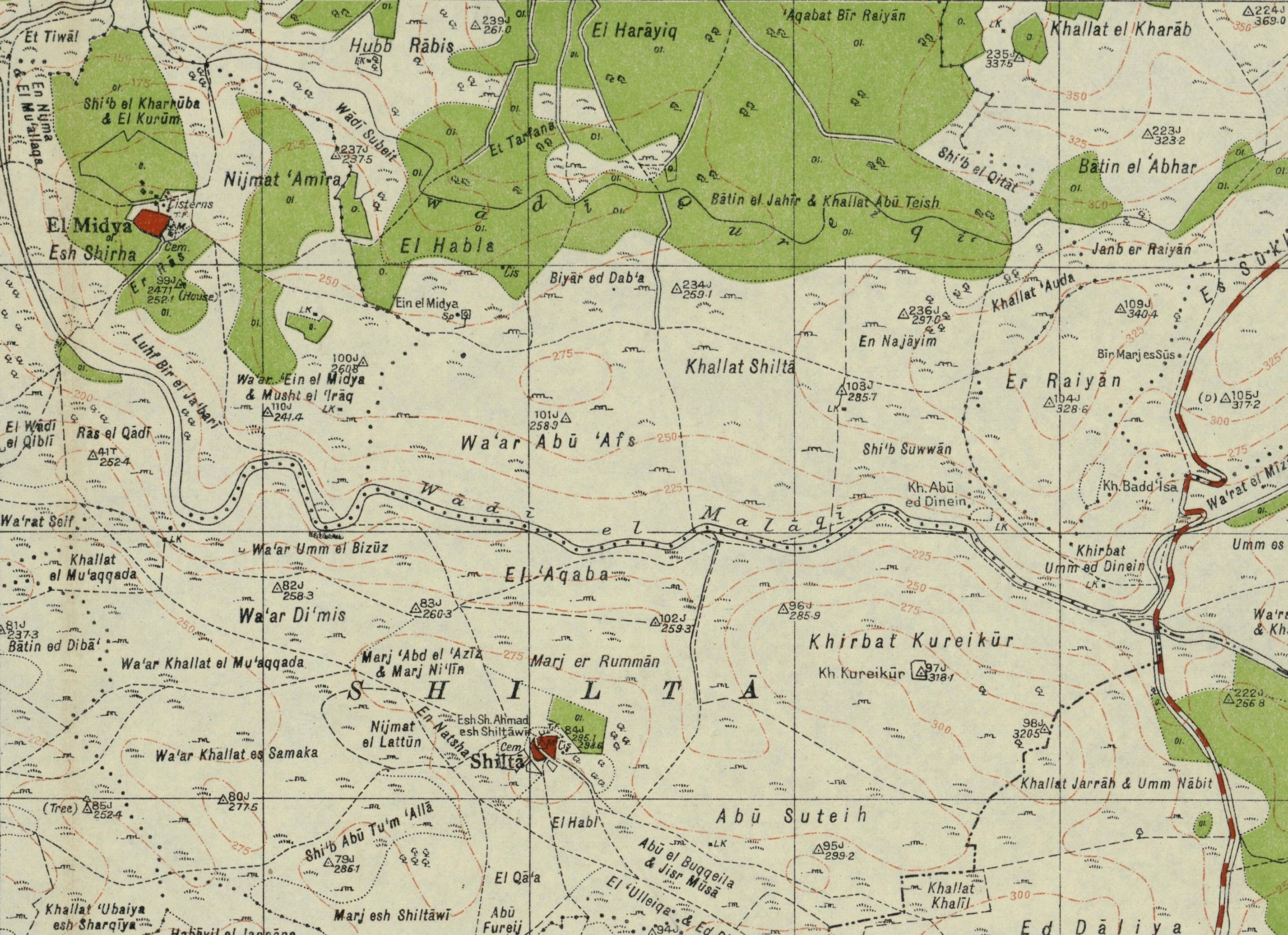
Shilta 1944 1:20,000 from 1919 survey

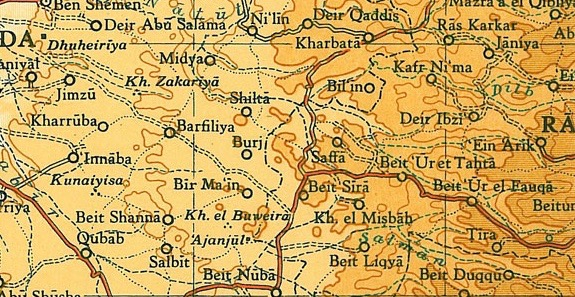
Shilta 1945 1:250,000

=== 1948 war; Israel ===
Shilta was depopulated after a military assault July 15–16, 1948.

Israel established Shilat and Kfar Ruth on village land in 1977.

In 1992, the village site was described: "The site is overgrown with mountain flora, including long grasses and pomegranate, almond, and carob trees. Some of the cactus hedges survive, and several wells also are visible. Israeli have built greenhouses for growing flowers, [] Israeli settlement houses have been built on village land."

== Bibliography ==
- Barron, J.B., ed. (1923). Palestine: Report and General Abstracts of the Census of 1922. Government of Palestine.
- Finkelstein, Israel; Lederman, Zvi, eds. (1997). Highlands of many cultures. Vol. 1. Tel Aviv: Institute of Archaeology of Tel Aviv University Publications Section. ISBN 965-440-007-3.
- Government of Palestine, Department of Statistics (1945). Village Statistics, April, 1945.
- Guérin, V. (1875). Description Géographique Historique et Archéologique de la Palestine (in French). Vol. 2: Samarie, pt. 2. Paris: L'Imprimerie Nationale.
- Hadawi, S. (1970). Village Statistics of 1945: A Classification of Land and Area ownership in Palestine. Palestine Liberation Organization Research Center.
- Hartmann, M. (1883). "Die Ortschaftenliste des Liwa Jerusalem in dem türkischen Staatskalender für Syrien auf das Jahr 1288 der Flucht (1871)". Zeitschrift des Deutschen Palästina-Vereins. 6: 102–149.
- Khalidi, W. (1992). All That Remains: The Palestinian Villages Occupied and Depopulated by Israel in 1948. Washington D.C.: Institute for Palestine Studies. ISBN 0-88728-224-5.
- Mills, E., ed. (1932). Census of Palestine 1931. Population of Villages, Towns and Administrative Areas. Jerusalem: Government of Palestine.
- Morris, B. (2004). The Birth of the Palestinian Refugee Problem Revisited. Cambridge University Press. ISBN 978-0-521-00967-6.
- Palmer, E.H. (1881). The Survey of Western Palestine: Arabic and English Name Lists Collected During the Survey by Lieutenants Conder and Kitchener, R. E. Transliterated and Explained by E.H. Palmer. Committee of the Palestine Exploration Fund.
- Socin, A. (1879). "Alphabetisches Verzeichniss von Ortschaften des Paschalik Jerusalem". Zeitschrift des Deutschen Palästina-Vereins. 2: 135–163.
