= Petah Tikva Natural Region =

Coordinates: 32°5′10″N 34°53′14″E

- Natural Region
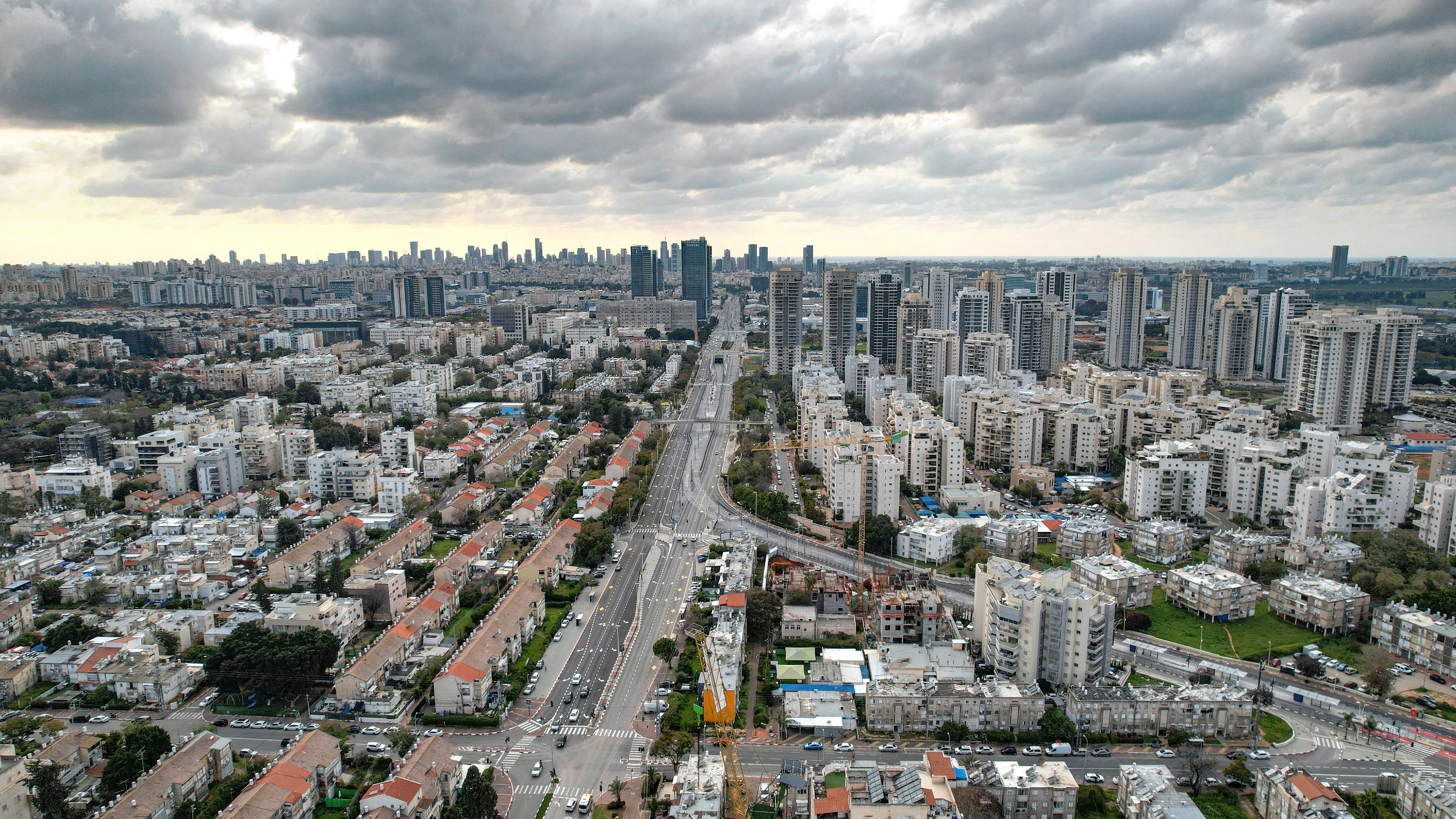
- Jabotinsky Street in Petah Tikva, the largest city in the Petah Tikva Natural Region
- Country: Israel
- District: Central
- Subdistrict: Petah Tikva
- Largest City: Petah Tikva

Area
  - Total: 160 km^{2} (62 sq mi)

Population (2024)
  - Total: 540,293

Ethnicity
  - Jews and others: 91.0%
  - Arabs: 5.9%

The Petah Tikva Natural Region is a natural region in the Petah Tikva Subdistrict, in the Central District of Israel. Petah Tikva is the largest city in the natural region.

== Geography ==
Districts, Subdistricts and Natural Regions of the State of Israel, 2018

The natural region consists mostly of a suburban area of the Israeli coastal plain directly east of Tel Aviv, stretching from Highway 4 to the Green Line and from Kafr Qasim in the north to the Yehud Stream in the south. It has an area of 160 km^{2}. The largest city in the natural region is Petah Tikva, the fourth-largest city in Israel, which contains roughly half of the natural region's population. Other major towns in the natural region include Rosh HaAyin, El'ad, and Kafr Qasim. The natural region contains portions of the Drom HaSharon and Hevel Modi'in regional councils.

== Demographics ==
With a population of 540,293 as of 2024, the Petah Tikva Natural Region is the most populous natural region in the Central District. The vast majority of the residents of the natural region are Jewish. 6 percent of the residents are Arab, concentrated in the city of Kafr Qasim and the town of Kafr Bara.

Historical population
Year	Pop.	±%
1972	137,000	—
1983	181,200	+32.3%
1995	242,500	+33.8%
2008	368,800	+52.1%
2022	520,249	+41.1%
2024	540,293	+3.9%

== Administrative local authorities ==
Cities	Local Councils	Villages
El'ad; Ganei Tikva; Givat Shmuel; Kafr Qasim; Petah Tikva; Rosh HaAyin; Yehud-Monosson	Kafr Bara; Savyon	Drom HaSharon: Einat; Gat Rimon; Givat HaShlosha; Kfar Ma'as; Kfar Sirkin; Magshimim; Nahshonim; Hevel Modi'in: Bareket; Be'erot Yitzhak; Bnei Atarot; Giv'at Ko'ah; Mazor; Nehalim; Nofekh; Rinatya; Tirat Yehuda

== Voting Patterns ==
In the 2022 election, 54 percent of voters in the natural region voted for the parties of the right-wing coalition led by Benjamin Netanyahu, while 38 percent voted for the parties of the center-left coalition led by Yair Lapid and 5 percent voted for the Arab parties.

In the 2026 election, 48 percent of voters in the natural region voted for the parties of the right-wing coalition led by Benjamin Netanyahu, while 40 percent voted for the parties of the center-left coalition led by Gadi Eisenkot and 6 percent voted for the Arab parties. An additional 3.4 percent voted for the Reservists, and 2.3 percent voted for Amcha Yisrael. Voter turnout increased 15 percent from the 2022 election.
