= Beit Arif =

Moshav in central Israel

Beit Arif: בֵּית עָרִיף (Hebrew)
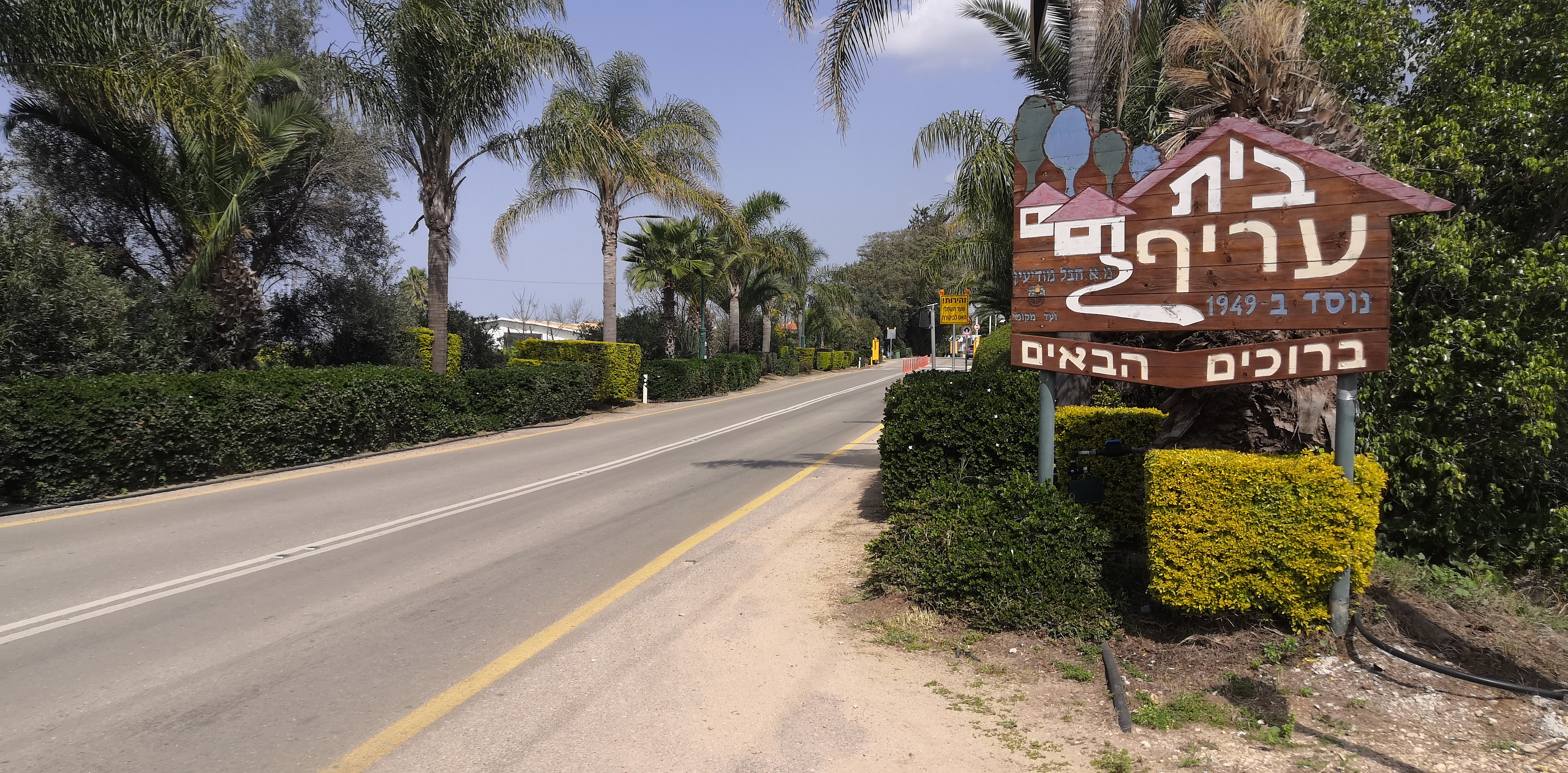
- Entrance to Beit Arif
- Etymology: House of Cloud
- Location within Central Israel Location within Israel
- Coordinates: 31°59′41″N 34°56′0″E
- Country: Israel
- District: Central
- Subdistrict: Ramla
- Council: Hevel Modi'in
- Affiliation: Moshavim Movement
- Founded: 1949
- Founder: Bulgarian Jews
- Population (2024): 1,137

Beit Arif (Hebrew: בֵּית עָרִיף, lit. 'House of Cloud') is a moshav in the Central District of Israel. Located adjacent to the town of Shoham, it falls under the jurisdiction of Hevel Modi'in Regional Council. In 2024 it had a population of 1,137.

== Etymology ==
The moshav was originally named Ahlama (Hebrew: אחלמה) (Exodus 28:19), after one of the twelve stones in the Hoshen, the sacred breastplate worn by a Jewish high priest. Four other nearby settlements, Bareket, Shoham, Leshem and Nofekh, are also named after such stones.

It was subsequently renamed Beit Arif, which is presumably derived from the Aramaic Byt Ḥrp, with the name of the ancient site being migrated from its original location in the neighboring youth village of Ben Shemen.

== History ==
During the 18th and 19th centuries Beit Arif was the site of the village of Dayr Tarif. It belonged to the Nahiyeh (sub-district) of Lod that encompassed the area of the present-day city of Modi'in-Maccabim-Re'ut in the south to the present-day city of El'ad in the north, and from the foothills in the east, through the Lod Valley to the outskirts of Jaffa in the west. This area was home to thousands of inhabitants in about 20 villages, who had at their disposal tens of thousands of hectares of prime agricultural land.

The moshav was founded in 1949 by immigrants from Bulgaria on the site of the depopulated Palestinian village of Dayr Tarif. In the early 1950s some Jewish refugees from Yemen and Aden arrived in the area, and built homes about half a kilometre away. After disagreements between the two groups, in 1953 the original residents left and moved to Ginaton (a moshav also founded by Bulgarian-Jewish immigrants).
