= Shemen =

Shemen may refer to:

== Places in Israel ==
- Ben Shemen
- Kerem Ben Shemen

== Oil ==
- Shemen (bible), a commonly used word for oil in the Hebrew scriptures
- Shemen Afarsimon, an oil used in antiquity
- Shemen HaMishcha, Hebrew for Anointing Oil, mentioned in the Old Testament
