= Ahisamakh =

Ahisamakh (Hebrew: אחיסמך, lit. Brother of support) may refer to:

- Ahisamakh, Israel, a moshav in central Israel
- Ahisamach (Bible), the father of Aholiab according to Exodus 31:6, Exodus 35:34, and Exodus 38:23
