= Hevel Modi'in Regional Council =

Israeli regional council

Coordinates: 32°03′N 34°55′E

Hevel Modi'in חבל מודיעין
- Regional council (from 1950)
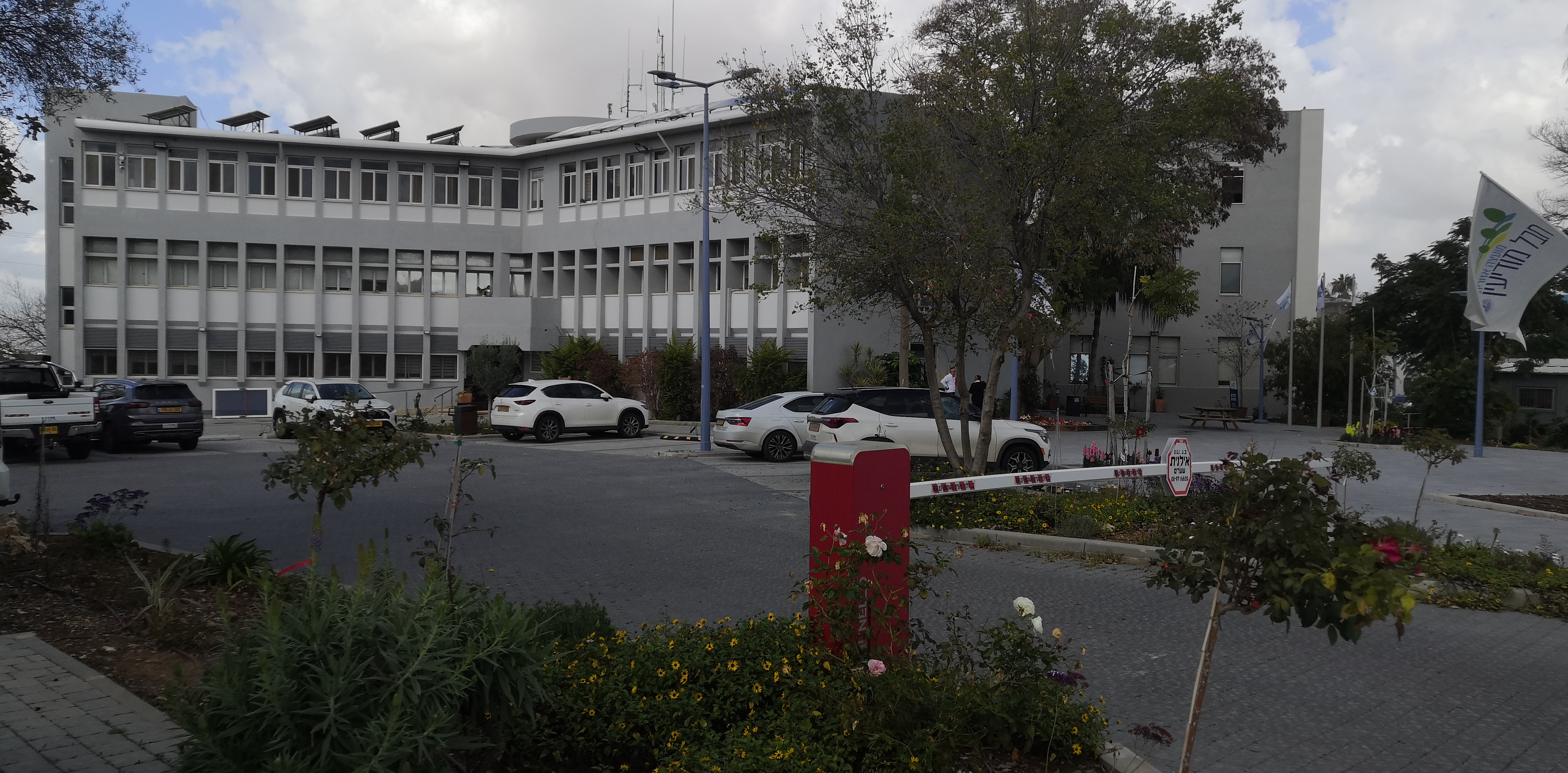
- Hevel Modiin Regional Council Headquarters
- Interactive map of Hevel Modi'in
- Country: Israel
- District: Central
- Subdistrict: Ramla, Petah Tikva
- Natural region: Petah Tikva, Modi'in, Ramla

Government
  - Head of Municipality: Shimon Sosan

Area
  - Total: 128,710 dunams (128.71 km^{2}; 49.70 sq mi)

Population (2024)
  - Total: 24,086
  - Density: 187.13/km^{2} (484.67/sq mi)
- Website: www.modiin-region.muni.il

Hevel Modi'in Regional Council (Hebrew: מועצה אזורית חבל מודיעין, romanized: Mo'atza Azorit Hevel Modi'in, lit. 'Modi'in Region Regional Council') is a regional council located partly in the Shephelah region and partly in the Central Coastal Plain region of the Central District of Israel. It was founded in 1950 and covers an area from Petah Tikva to Modi'in. The council's headquarters are located in the town of Shoham.

The council borders

- Drom HaSharon Regional Council, El'ad and Rosh HaAyin in the north
- Mateh Binyamin Regional Council in the east
- Gezer Regional Council and Modi'in-Maccabim-Re'ut in the south
- Drom HaSharon, Sdot Dan Regional Council, Lod and Ramla in the west.

The head rabbi of the regional council is Rabbi Eliav Meir who is also the head rabbi of Gimzo.

== List of settlements ==
The council covers a kibbutz, 19 moshavim, three community settlements and a youth village.

Kibbutzim

- Be'erot Yitzhak

Moshavim

- Ahisamakh
- Bareket
- Beit Arif
- Beit Nehemia
- Ben Shemen
- Bnei Atarot
- Ginaton
- Gimzo
- Givat Koah
- Hadid
- Kerem Ben Shemen
- Kfar Daniel
- Kfar Rut
- Kfar Truman
- Mazor
- Nehalim
- Rinatia
- Shilat
- Tirat Yehuda

Community settlements

- Lapid
- Mevo Modi'im
- Nofekh

Youth villages

- Ben Shemen Youth Village

== Demographics ==
Historical population
Year	Pop.	±%
1972	6,900	—
1983	8,200	+18.8%
1995	10,900	+32.9%
2008	18,920	+73.6%
2022	23,763	+25.6%
2024	24,086	+1.4%

== Voting Patterns ==
In the 2022 election, 54 percent of voters in the regional council voted for the parties of the right-wing coalition led by Benjamin Netanyahu, while 46 percent voted for the parties of the center-left coalition led by Yair Lapid and 0.3 percent voted for the Arab parties.

In the 2026 election, 47 percent of voters in the regional council voted for the parties of the right-wing coalition led by Benjamin Netanyahu, while 46 percent voted for the parties of the center-left coalition led by Gadi Eisenkot and 0.2 percent voted for the Arab parties. An additional 3.7 percent voted for the Reservists, and 3.2 percent voted for Amcha Yisrael. Voter turnout increased 8 percent from the 2022 election.
