= Ben Shemen Youth Village =

Youth village in central Israel

Ben Shemen Youth Village: כפר הנוער בן שמן (Hebrew)
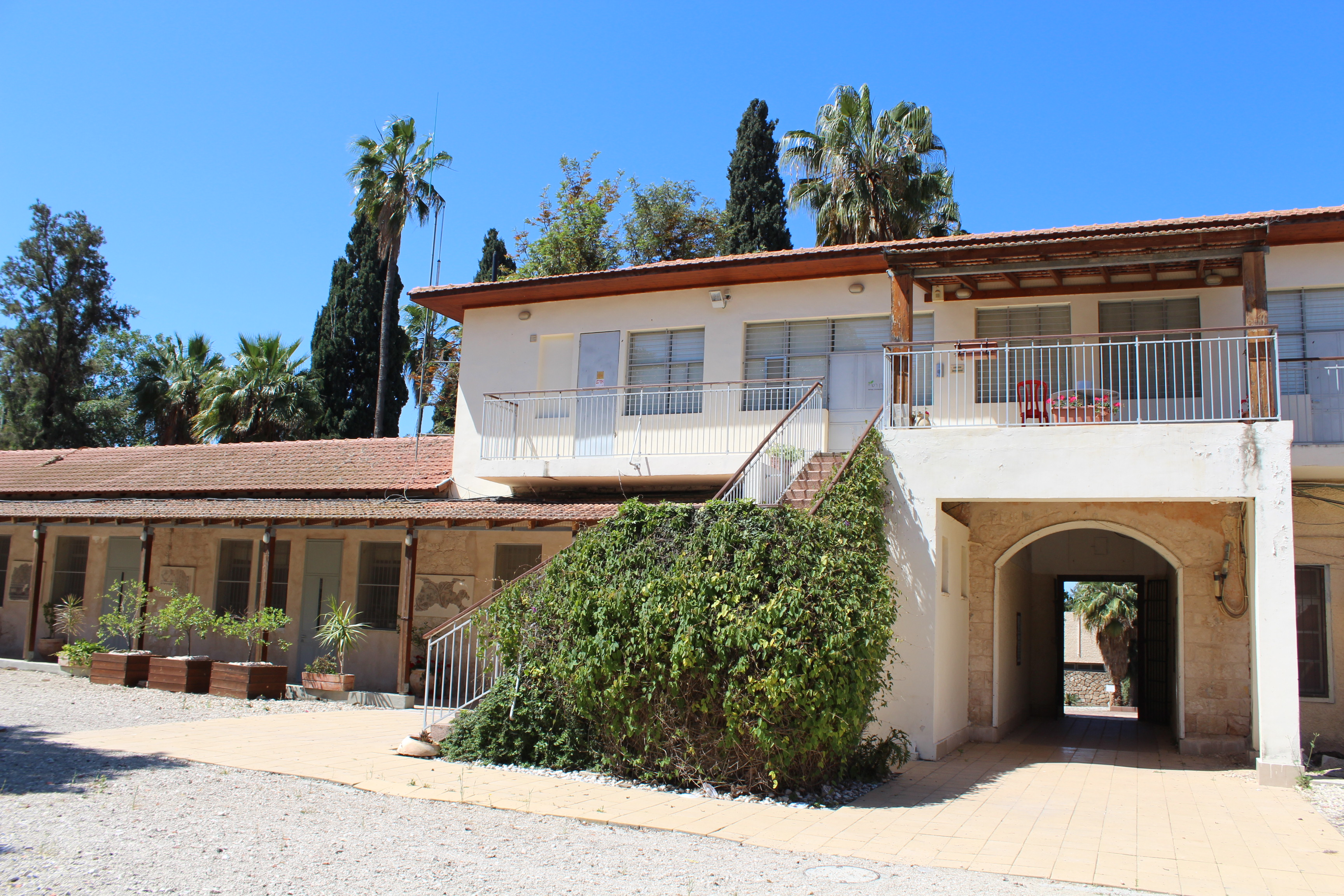

- Location within Central Israel
- Coordinates: 31°57′32″N 34°55′40″E
- Country: Israel
- District: Central
- Subdistrict: Ramla
- Council: Hevel Modi'in
- Founded: 1927
- Founder: Siegfried Lehmann
- Population (2024): 269
- Website: www.ben-shemen.org.il

Ben Shemen Youth Village (Hebrew: כפר הנוער בן שמן, Kfar HaNo'ar Ben Shemen) is a youth village and agricultural boarding school in central Israel. Located near Ben Shemen and Ginaton, it falls under the jurisdiction of Hevel Modi'in Regional Council. In 2024 it had a population of 269.

== History ==
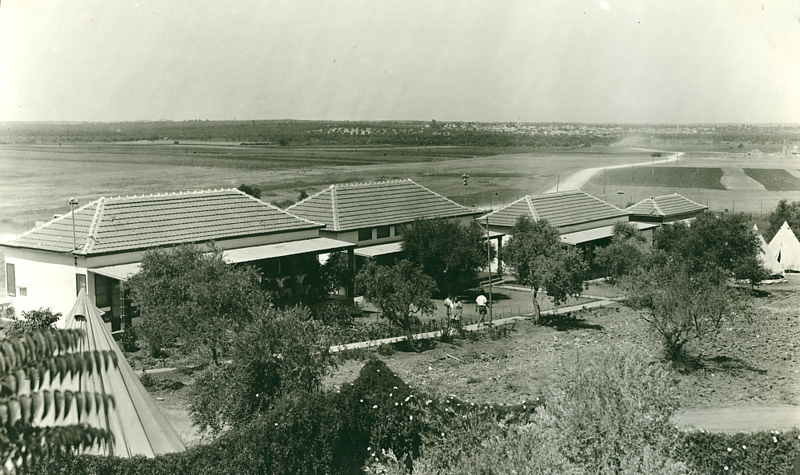
Ben Shemen youth village, 1920s-30s

The village was established in 1927 on the land of the Hadid factory by Siegfried Lehman. Lehman had previously intended to establish the village in the Harod Valley, but decided against it after learning that Anopheles mosquitoes in the marshes could pose a deadly hazard to future students. Joseph Jacobson, uncle of the philanthropist Eli Broad, was one of the community’s early founders.

Its aim was to endow children with a Zionist ethic, teach them to work the land, and install an appreciation of responsibility. Lehman instilled that the students should respect their Arab neighbours and their culture. Most weekends, the students attended trips to the neighbouring Arab villages. In addition, Arab performers such as musicians and dancers participated in Ben Shemen’s festivals. Arab rural civilization was also studied and celebrated as part of an Orient fair. Upon Lehman’s instructions, the youth village’s medical clinic also provided care to neighbouring Arabs that sought it. Lehman also built a fountain at the gates to the village, for the benefit of Arab villagers.

The school's first students were from Kaunas in Lithuania.The youth village began with an enrolment roll of 15 students in 1927, increasing to 220 in 1931, and around 600 by 1946. A swimming pool and sports fields were also developed. Long red-roofed dormitories were built for the students. The village also became home to a sheep pen, a horse stable, chicken coops, apiaries, a vineyard, a cowshed, a vegetable garden and wheat fields.

In January 1940 British forces found an arms cache at the village. In 1947 it had a population of roughly 1,000. In June of that year, it was visited by the 11-person United Nations inquiry commission prior to their endorsement of a partition plan. During the 1948 Arab–Israeli War, the isolated village was under siege by the Arab Legion; eleven youths were killed in one attempt to bring in supplies. In February 1948 around four hundred students were evacuated from the village.

In June 1957 the Elsa and Albert Einstein Agricultural School was opened in the youth village. At the time, the school anticipated serving 700 day students and 300 attending night school. Albert Einstein allowed his name to be used and sent a message of greeting to the cornerstone ceremony in May 1954.

Notable graduates include Shimon Peres, Shulamit Aloni, Moshe Katsav, Dan Ben Amotz, Micha Tomkiewicz, Amitai Etzioni, Maru Teferi and Haim Saban. Peres met his future wife Sonia Peres in the village, as they were living there at the same time.

Today it has around 1,000 students, of which 400 live in the village.
