= Dayr Tarif =

Dayr Tarif دير طريف Deir Tarif
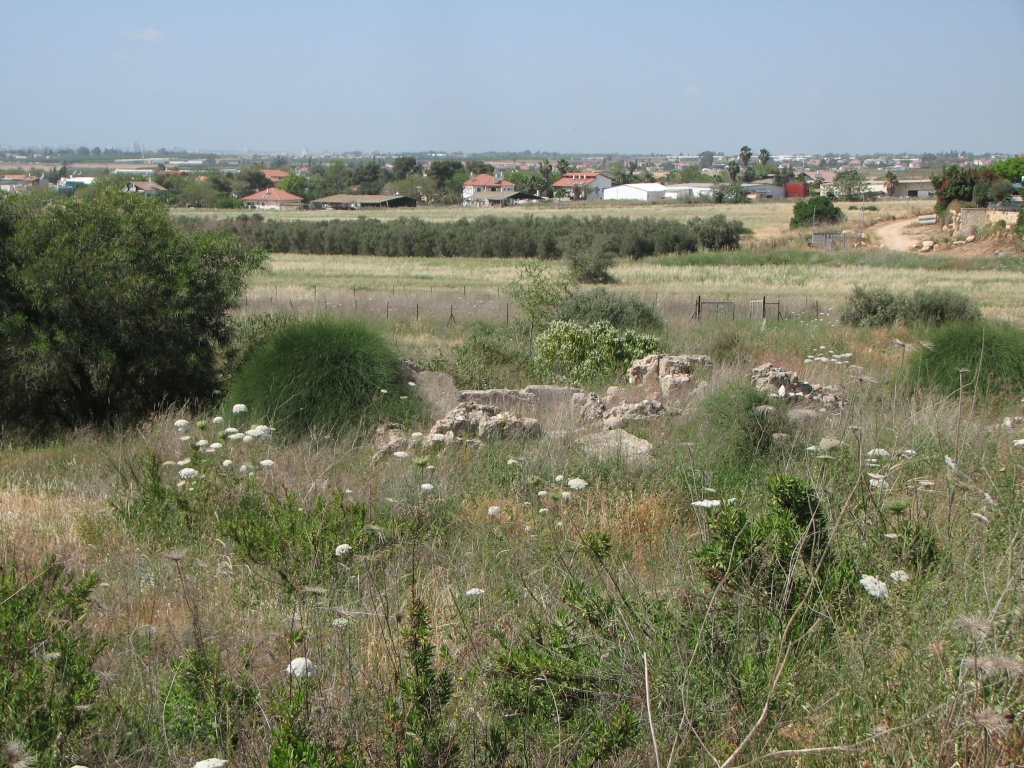
- Dayr Tarif remains
- Etymology: The monastery of Tureif ("the end")
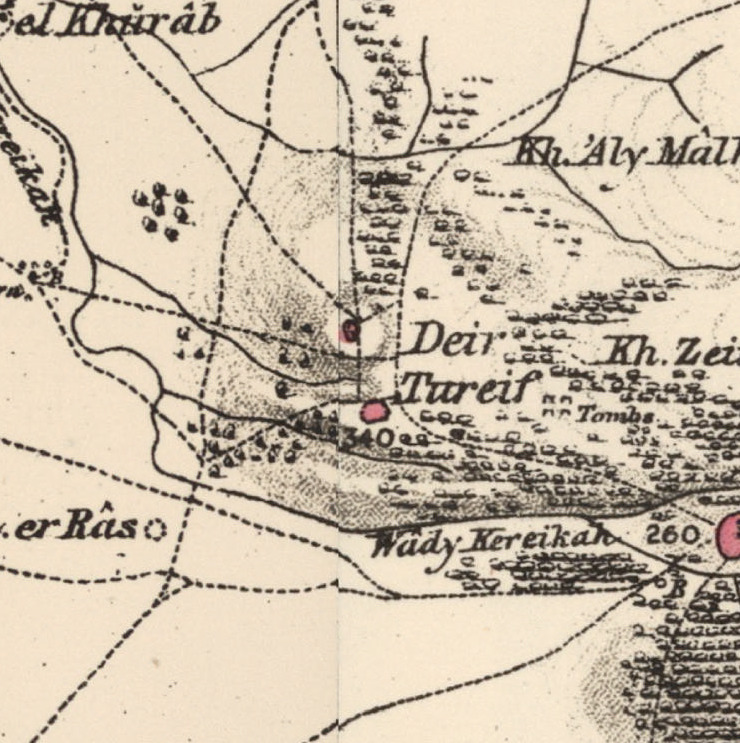
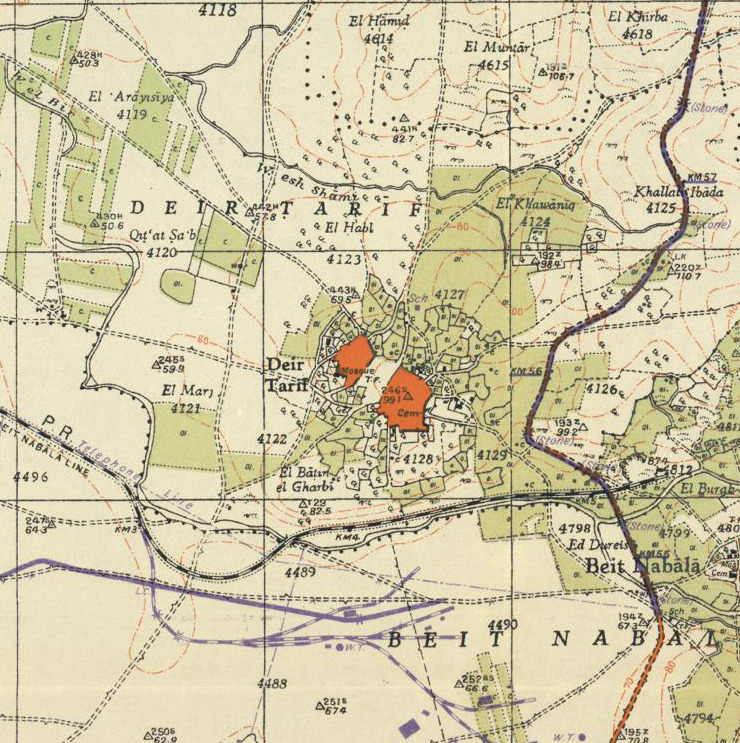
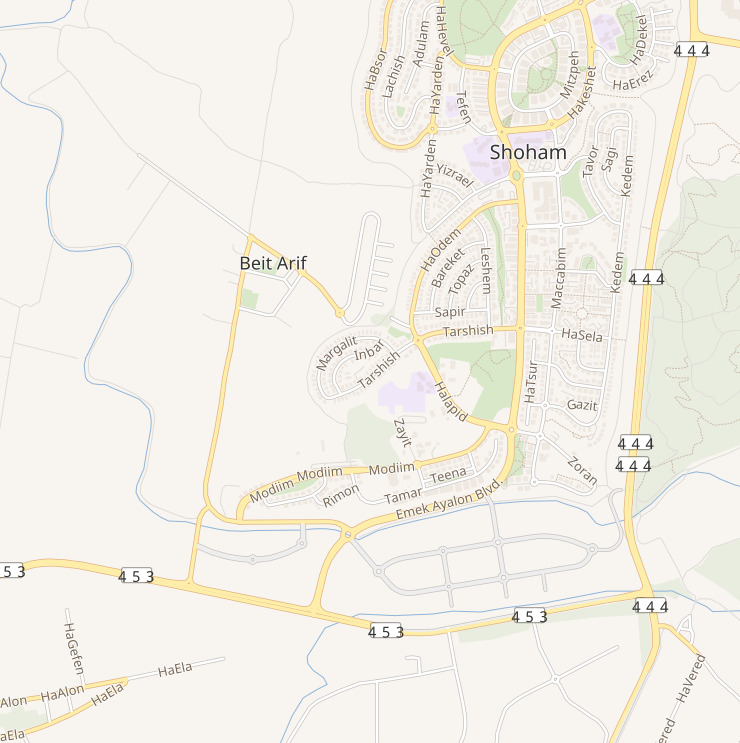
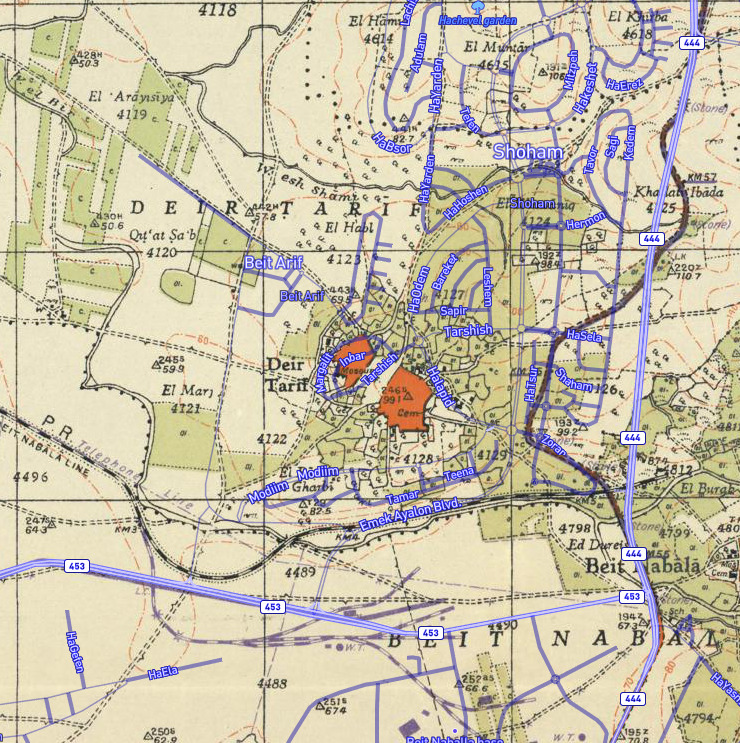
- 1870s map 1940s map modern map 1940s with modern overlay map A series of historical maps of the area around Dayr Tarif (click the buttons)

- Location within Mandatory Palestine
- Coordinates: 31°59′33″N 34°56′23″E
- Palestine grid: 144/155
- Geopolitical entity: Mandatory Palestine
- Subdistrict: Ramle
- Date of depopulation: July 10, 1948

Population (1948)
  - Total: 1,750
- Cause(s) of depopulation: Military assault by Yishuv forces
- Current Localities: Beit Arif

Dayr Tarif was a Palestinian Arab village in the Ramle Subdistrict of Mandatory Palestine. It was depopulated during the 1948 Arab-Israeli War on July 10, 1948.

== History ==
The site is identified with Bethariph, a place mentioned in Eusebius' Onomasticon, which was composed in the early 4th century CE. According to SWP; "South-west of the village are traces of ruins, cisterns, and 'rock-sunk' tombs, evidently Christian again, as connected with a monastery." Ceramics from the Byzantine era have been found here.

=== Ottoman era ===
Dayr Tarif, like the rest of Palestine, was incorporated into the Ottoman Empire in 1517, and in the census of 1596, the village was located in the nahiya (subdistrict) of al-Ramla under the Liwa of Gaza, with a population of 49 households, an estimated 270 persons, all Muslim. They paid a fixed tax rate of 25% on agricultural products, including wheat, barley, summer crops, vineyards, fruit trees, sesame, goats and beehives, in addition to occasional revenues; a total of 9,000 akçe.

According to Marom, in the 18th or early 19th centuries, residents of Qibya affiliated with the Yamani camp during the Qays and Yaman conflicts, alongside residents of Qibya and part of the residents of Bayt Nabala. They fought several skirmishes against rivals from Deir Abu Mash'al and Jayyous.

In 1838 Deir Tureif was among the villages Edward Robinson noted from the top of the White Mosque, Ramla.

In 1870, Victor Guérin estimated that the village had 400 inhabitants. He further noted ancient columns by the mosque. An Ottoman village list from about the same year found that the village had a population of 374, in a total of 93 houses, though the population count included men, only.

In 1882 the PEF's Survey of Western Palestine (SWP) described the village as "A very small hamlet at the edge of the plain. This would seem to be the place called Betariph in the 'Onomasticon,' near Diospolis (Lod)."

=== British Mandate era ===
In the 1922 census of Palestine conducted by the British Mandate authorities, Dayr Tarif had a population of 836; all Muslims, increasing in the 1931 census to 1,246, still all Muslims, in a total of 291 houses.

An elementary school was founded in 1920 and by 1947, it had 171 students.

In the 1945 statistics the population was 1,750, all Muslims, while the total land area was 8,756 dunams, according to an official land and population survey. Of this, a total of 1,410 dunams were used for citrus and bananas, 486 dunums were plantations or irrigated, 5,989 for cereals, while 51 dunams were classified as built-up public areas.

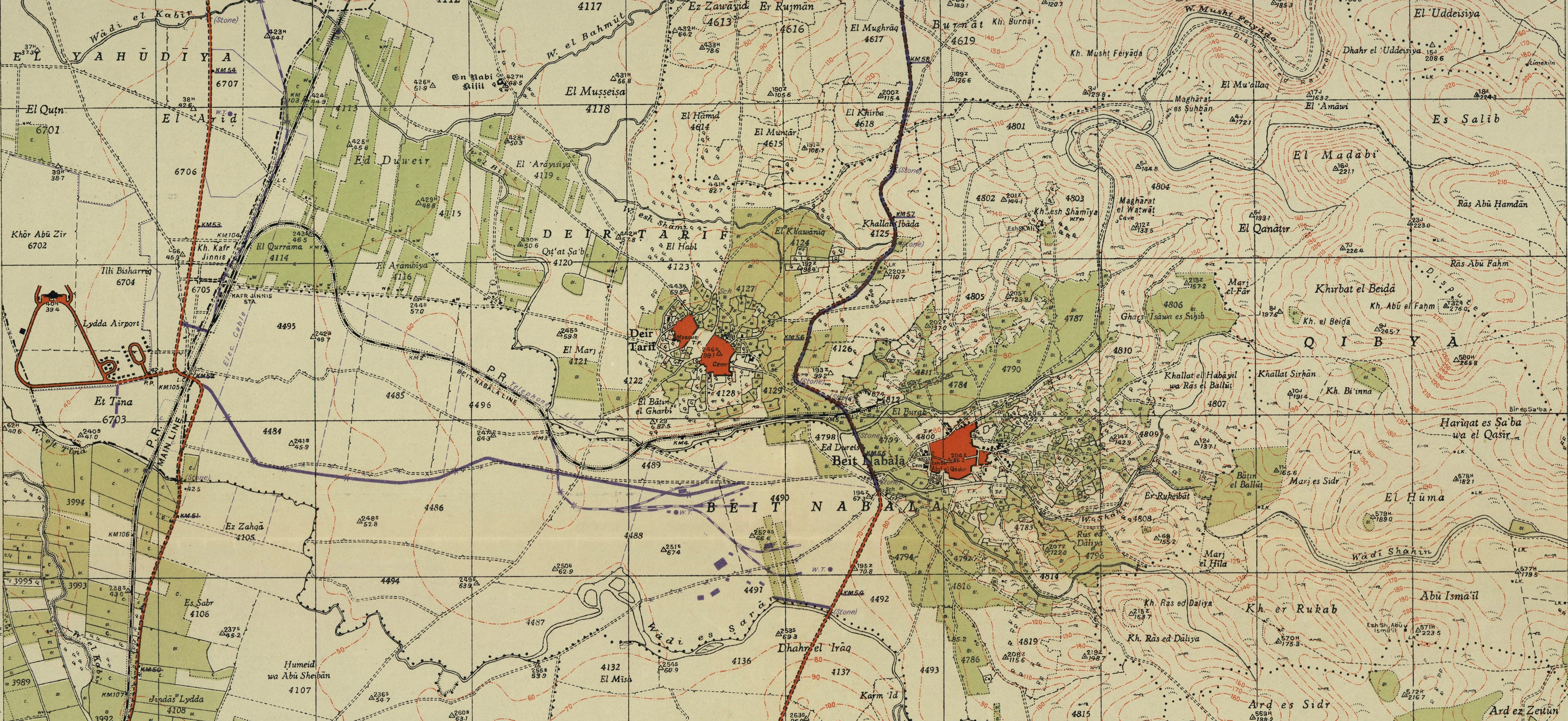
Deir Tarif 1942 1:20,000

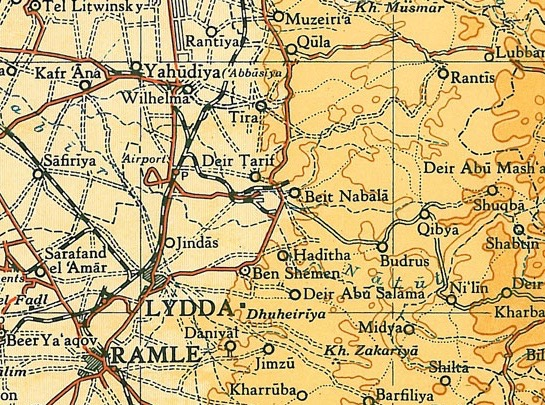
Deir Tarif 1945 1:250,000

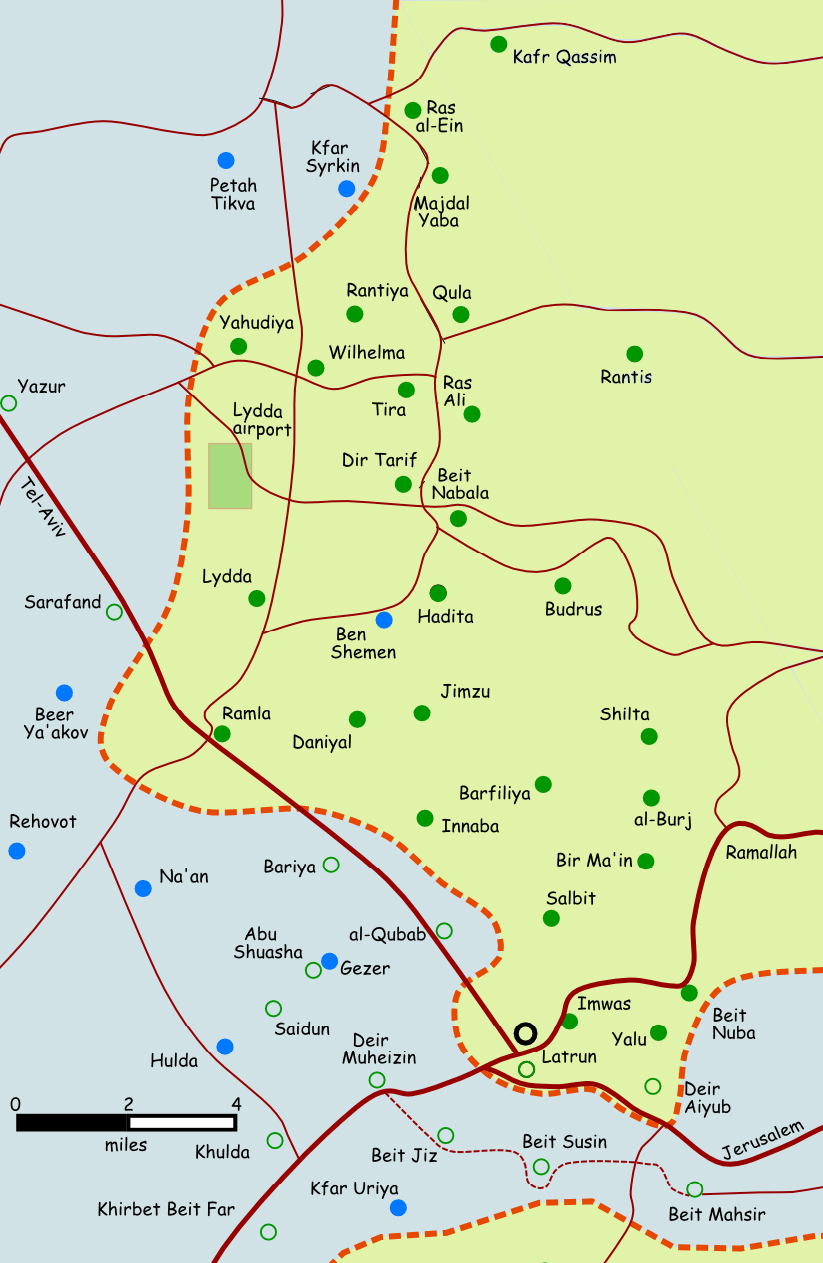
Depopulated villages in the Ramle Subdistrict

=== 1948, aftermath ===
Dayr Tarif was depopulated during the 1948 Arab-Israeli War on July 10, 1948, by the Ninth Commando Battalion of the Armored Brigade of Operation Dani. The village, with a population of 2,030, was defended by the Jordanian Army, but Dayr Tarif was mostly destroyed with the exception of its school, which serves as a stable. After it was conquered, the Palestinian population was expelled. The IDF asked for permission to destroy this village and a cluster of over a dozen others, after the commander Zvi Ayalon noted that they lacked sufficient manpower to occupy the area.

In 1992 the village site was described: "The site, covered with the debris of destroyed houses, is overgrown with thorns and other wild plants. A number of old olive and cypress trees are scattered across the site. The school building serves as a stable. Cotton and citrus are cultivated by Israelis on the surrounding lands."

== Bibliography ==
- Barron, J.B., ed. (1923). Palestine: Report and General Abstracts of the Census of 1922. Government of Palestine.
- Conder, C.R.; Kitchener, H.H. (1882). The Survey of Western Palestine: Memoirs of the Topography, Orography, Hydrography, and Archaeology. Vol. 2. London: Committee of the Palestine Exploration Fund.
- Dauphin, C. (1998). La Palestine byzantine, Peuplement et Populations. BAR International Series 726 (in French). Vol. III : Catalogue. Oxford: Archeopress. ISBN 0-860549-05-4.
- Department of Statistics (1945). Village Statistics, April, 1945. Government of Palestine.
- Guérin, V. (1875). Description Géographique Historique et Archéologique de la Palestine (in French). Vol. 2: Samarie, pt. 2. Paris: L'Imprimerie Nationale.
- Hadawi, S. (1970). Village Statistics of 1945: A Classification of Land and Area ownership in Palestine. Palestine Liberation Organization Research Centre.
- Hartmann, M. (1883). "Die Ortschaftenliste des Liwa Jerusalem in dem türkischen Staatskalender für Syrien auf das Jahr 1288 der Flucht (1871)". Zeitschrift des Deutschen Palästina-Vereins. 6: 102–149.
- Hütteroth, W.-D.; Abdulfattah, K. (1977). Historical Geography of Palestine, Transjordan and Southern Syria in the Late 16th Century. Erlanger Geographische Arbeiten, Sonderband 5. Erlangen, Germany: Vorstand der Fränkischen Geographischen Gesellschaft. ISBN 3-920405-41-2.
- Khalidi, W. (1992). All That Remains: The Palestinian Villages Occupied and Depopulated by Israel in 1948. Washington D.C.: Institute for Palestine Studies. ISBN 0-88728-224-5.
- Mills, E., ed. (1932). Census of Palestine 1931. Population of Villages, Towns and Administrative Areas. Jerusalem: Government of Palestine.
- Morris, B. (2004). The Birth of the Palestinian Refugee Problem Revisited. Cambridge University Press. ISBN 978-0-521-00967-6.
- Palmer, E.H. (1881). The Survey of Western Palestine: Arabic and English Name Lists Collected During the Survey by Lieutenants Conder and Kitchener, R. E. Transliterated and Explained by E.H. Palmer. Committee of the Palestine Exploration Fund.
- Robinson, E.; Smith, E. (1841). Biblical Researches in Palestine, Mount Sinai and Arabia Petraea: A Journal of Travels in the year 1838. Vol. 3. Boston: Crocker & Brewster.
- Socin, A. (1879). "Alphabetisches Verzeichniss von Ortschaften des Paschalik Jerusalem". Zeitschrift des Deutschen Palästina-Vereins. 2: 135–163.
