= Bnei Atarot =

Moshav in central Israel

Bnei Atarot: בְּנֵי עֲטָרוֹת (Hebrew)
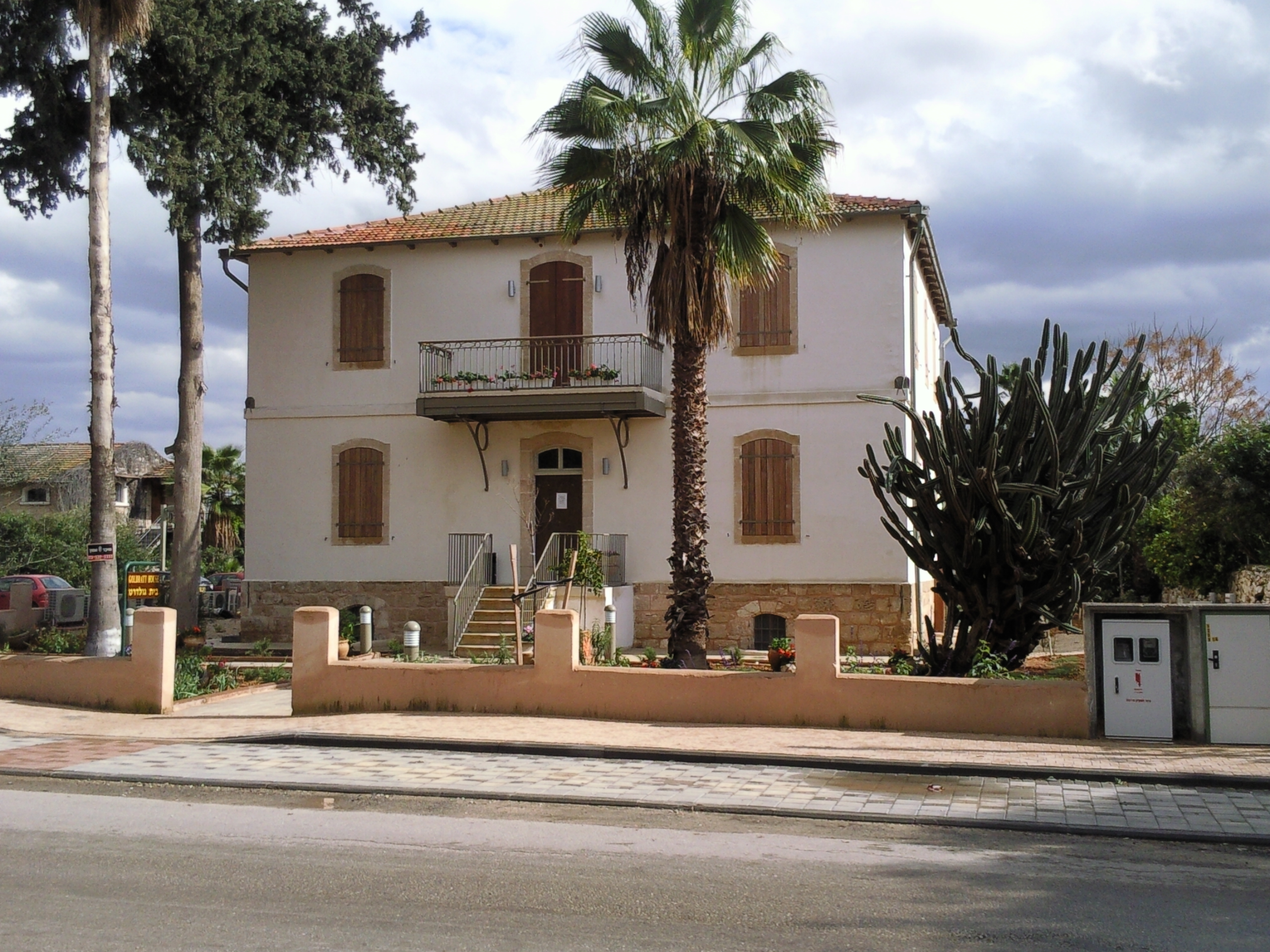
- The Bulach House in Bnei Atarot

- Location within Central Israel Location within Israel
- Coordinates: 32°1′24″N 34°54′49″E
- Country: Israel
- District: Central
- Subdistrict: Petah Tikva
- Council: Hevel Modi'in
- Affiliation: Moshavim Movement
- Founded: 1948
- Founder: Former residents of Atarot
- Population (2024): 922
- Website: www.bneiatarot.org

Bnei Atarot (Hebrew: בְּנֵי עֲטָרוֹת, lit. 'Sons of Atarot') is a moshav in the Central District of Israel. Located near Yehud, around 15 kilometres east of Tel Aviv, it is situated in fertile plains at the eastern rim of Tel Aviv metropolitan area next to Ben Gurion Airport and falls under the jurisdiction of Hevel Modi'in Regional Council. In 2024 it had a population of 922.

== History ==
During the Ottoman period, the lands of the future Bnei Atarot belonged to the Nahiyeh (sub-district) of Lod that encompassed the area of the present-day city of Modi'in-Maccabim-Re'ut in the south to the present-day city of El'ad in the north, and from the foothills in the east, through the Lod Valley to the outskirts of Jaffa in the west. This area was home to thousands of inhabitants in about 20 villages, who had at their disposal tens of thousands of hectares of prime agricultural land.

Bnei Atarot is located on the site of the Templer colony of Wilhelma, established in 1902, and named in honour of Wilhelm II, German Emperor. During World War II, German settlers in Mandatory Palestine were arrested as enemy nationals and deported by the British.

After the war ended, a new settlement was established by former residents of the abandoned moshav of Atarot, which had been destroyed by the Arab Legion, from which it took its name, as well as others from Nehalim in the Upper Galilee and Be'erot Yitzhak in the Negev. It remained a farming community and most of the original houses were preserved. The community is centered along the main road.

The proximity of Tel Aviv metropolitan area has led to suburbanization and the rural character of the village gradually decreased. In the late 1990s a new residential neighborhood was built on the northeastern edge of the moshav, consisting of private homes. Recently, the proximity of Ben Gurion Airport has led to some residents being evacuated due to noise concerns.

== Notable residents ==
- Rama Messinger

== Gallery ==
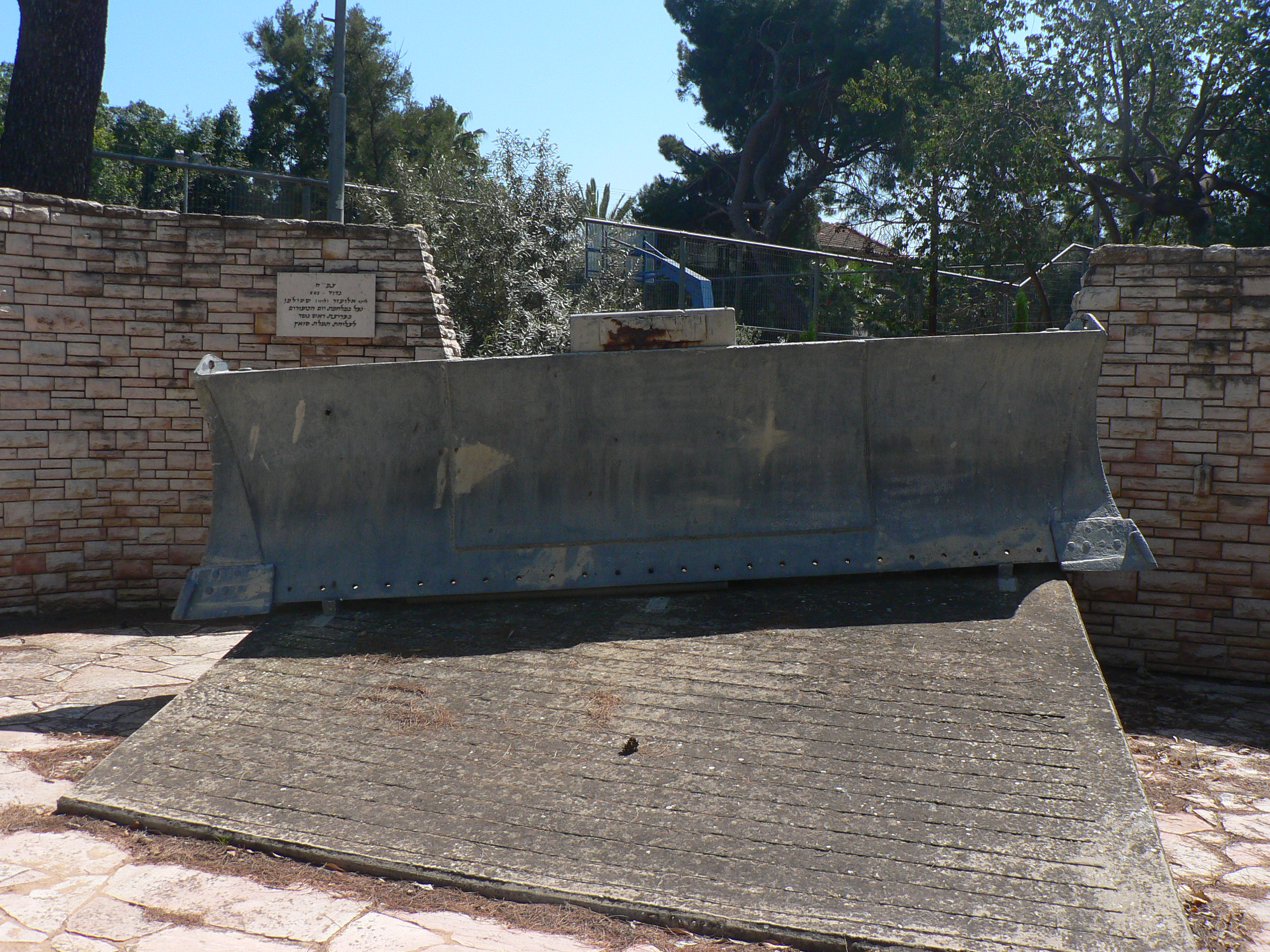
Monument for Israel Engineerings Corps, Battalion 605, Engineering Vehicles platoon in Bney Atarot

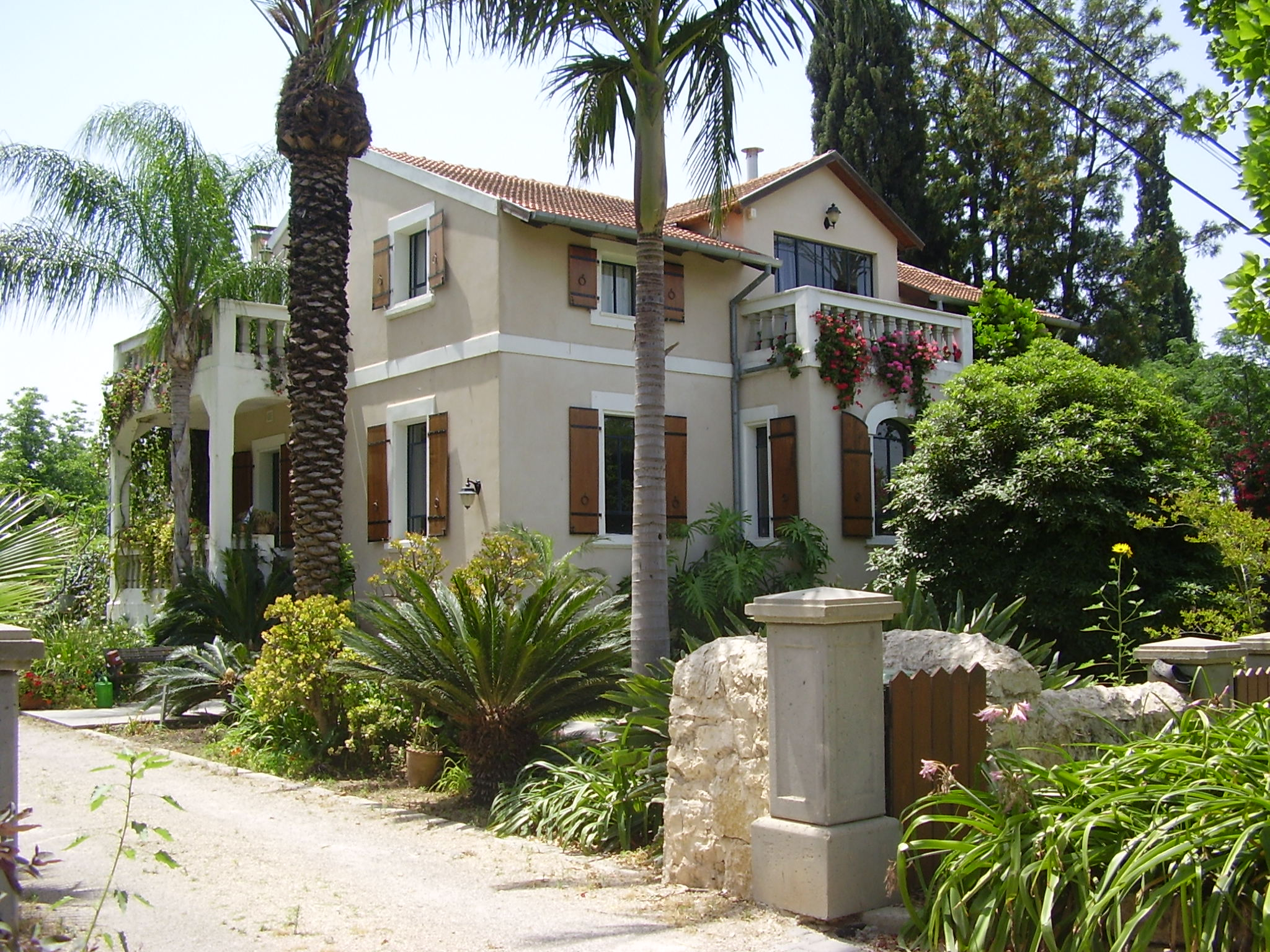
Renovated Templer house, Bnei Atarot

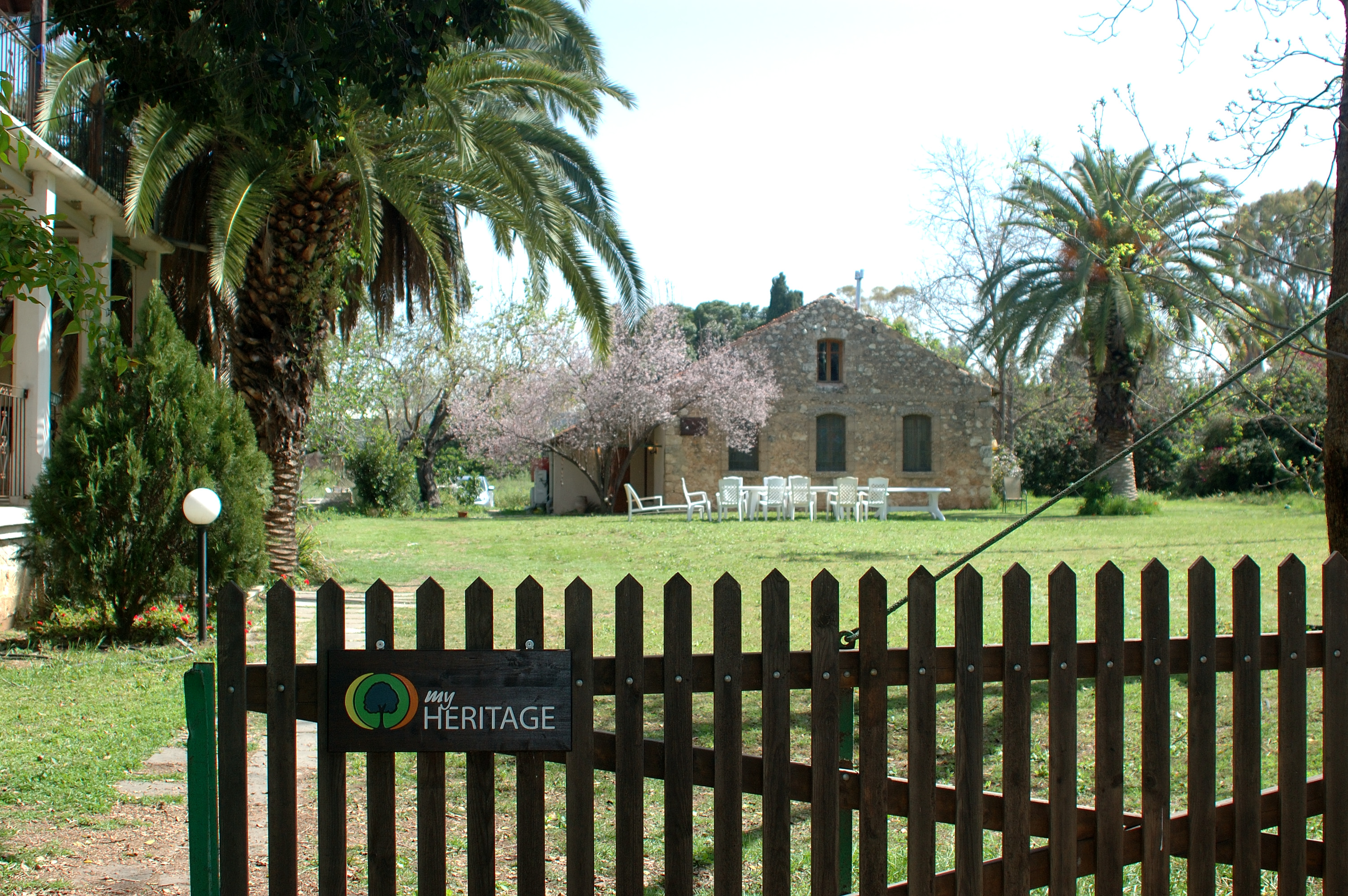
MyHeritage.com office
