= Rinatya =

Moshav in central Israel

Rinatya: רִינַּתְיָה (Hebrew)
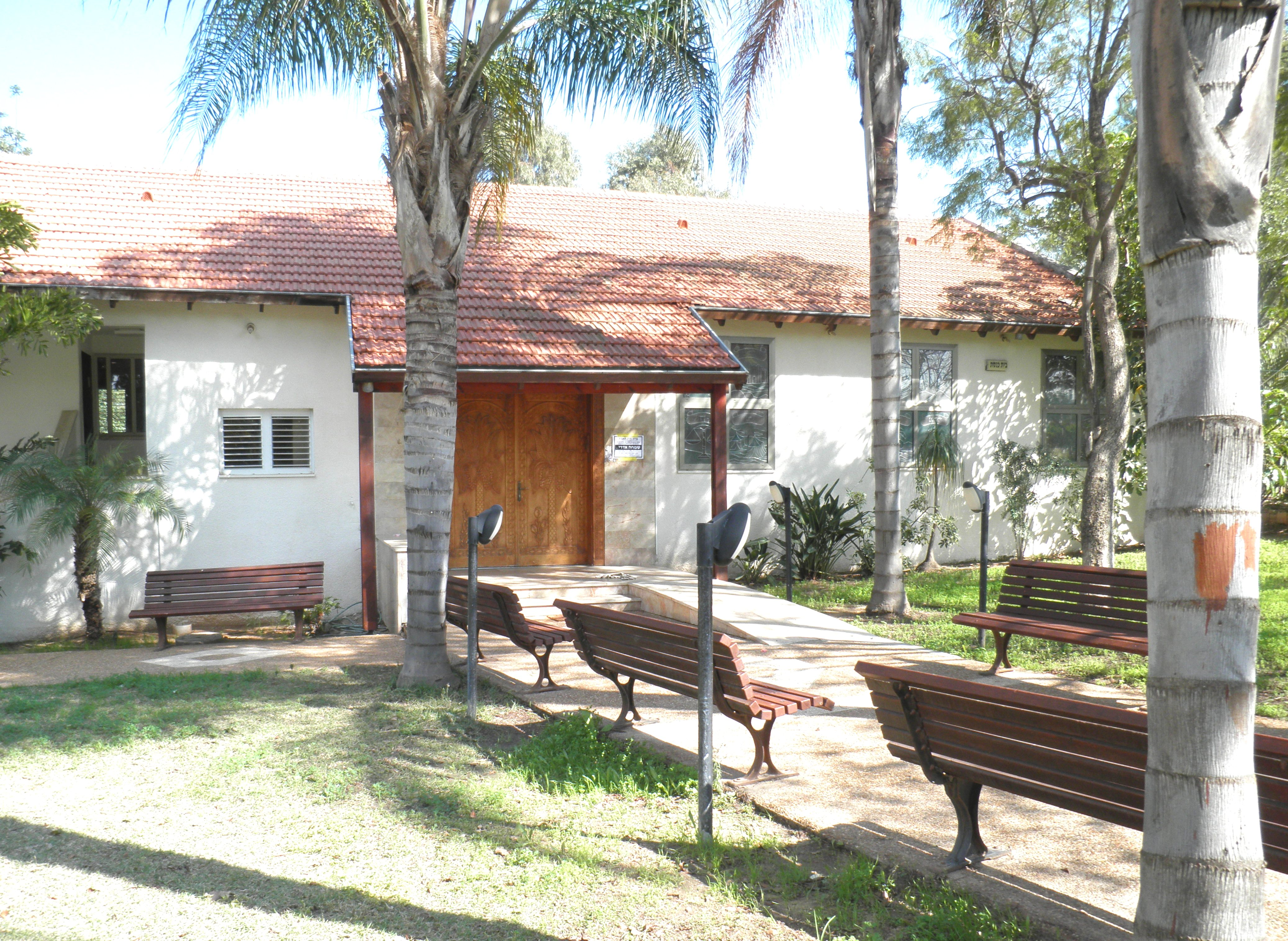

- Location within Central Israel Location within Israel
- Coordinates: 32°2′37″N 34°55′40″E
- Country: Israel
- District: Central
- Subdistrict: Petah Tikva
- Council: Hevel Modi'in
- Affiliation: Moshavim Movement
- Founded: 1949
- Founder: Moroccan Jewish immigrants
- Population (2024): 1,235

Rinatya (Hebrew: רִנַּתְיָה) is a moshav in central Israel. Located between Petah Tikva and Yehud, it falls under the jurisdiction of Hevel Modi'in Regional Council. In 2024 it had a population of 1,235.

== History ==
During the Ottoman period, Rinatya was the site of the Palestinian village of Rantiya. It belonged to the nahiyeh (sub-district) of Lod that encompassed the area of the present-day city of Modi'in-Maccabim-Re'ut in the south to the present-day city of El'ad in the north, and from the foothills in the east, through the Lod Valley to the outskirts of Jaffa in the west. This area was home to thousands of inhabitants in about 20 villages, who had at their disposal tens of thousands of hectares of prime agricultural land.

The moshav was established in 1949 by immigrants and refugees from Morocco on the land of the depopulated Palestinian Arab village of Rantiya.
