= Ginaton =

Moshav in central Israel

Ginaton: גִּנָּתוֹן (Hebrew)
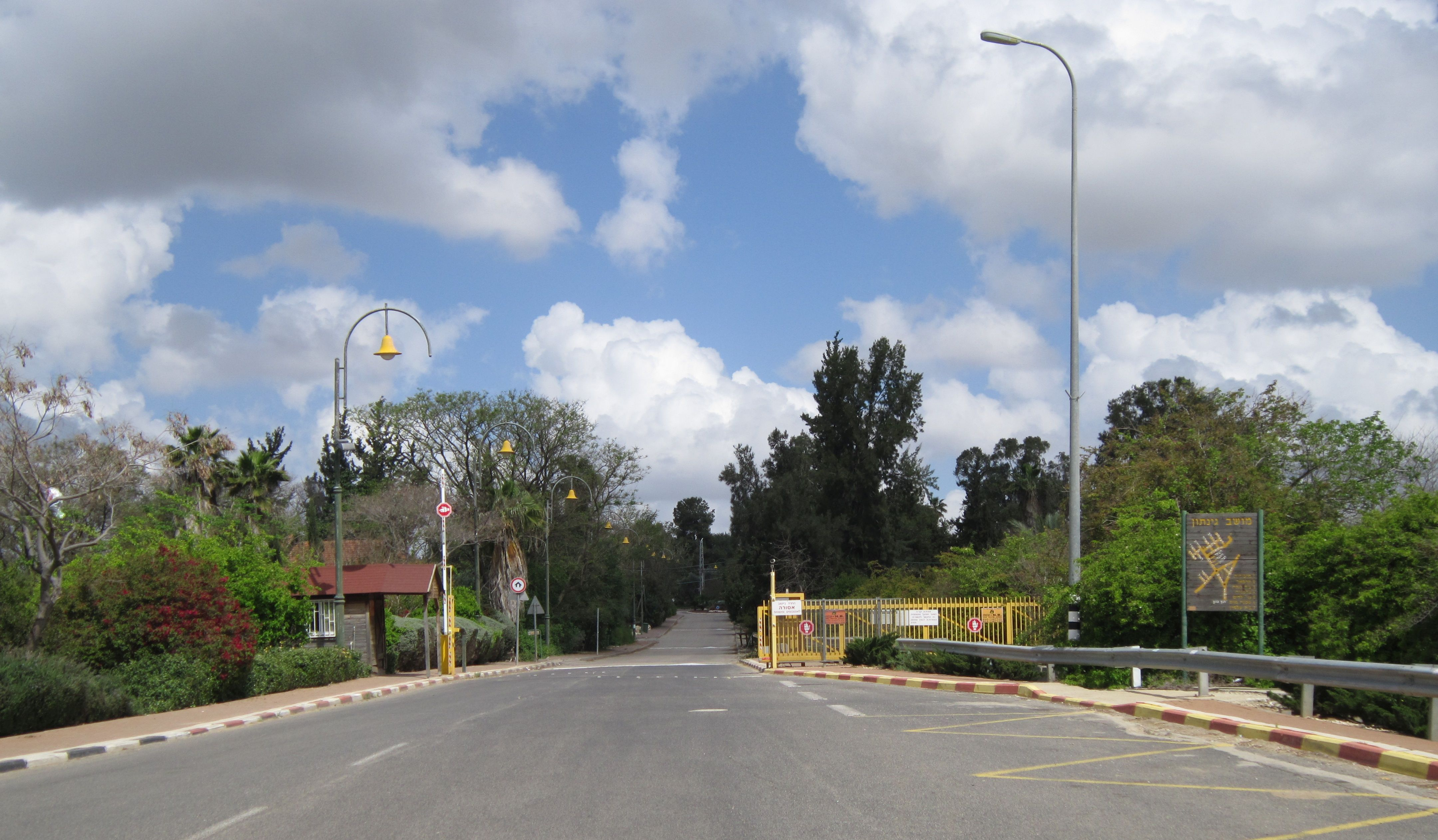
- Entrance gate with a wood-carved street plan

- Location within Central Israel
- Coordinates: 31°57′45″N 34°54′51″E
- Country: Israel
- District: Central
- Subdistrict: Ramla
- Council: Hevel Modi'in
- Affiliation: Moshavim Movement
- Founded: 1949
- Founder: Bulgarian immigrants
- Population (2024): 1,055

Ginaton (Hebrew: גִּנָּתוֹן) is a moshav in central Israel. Located near Ben Shemen, it falls under the jurisdiction of Hevel Modi'in Regional Council. In 2024 it had a population of 1,055.

== History ==
The village was established in 1949 by immigrants from Bulgaria, near the ancient site of Jindas, inhabited during the Late Roman, Byzantine, Early Islamic, Crusader, Mamluk and Ottoman periods. Its name is taken from the Book of Nehemiah 10:7. The founders were later joined by more immigrants from Hungary, Iran, North Africa and Romania.
