= Nofekh =

Community settlement in central Israel

Nofekh: נופך (Hebrew)
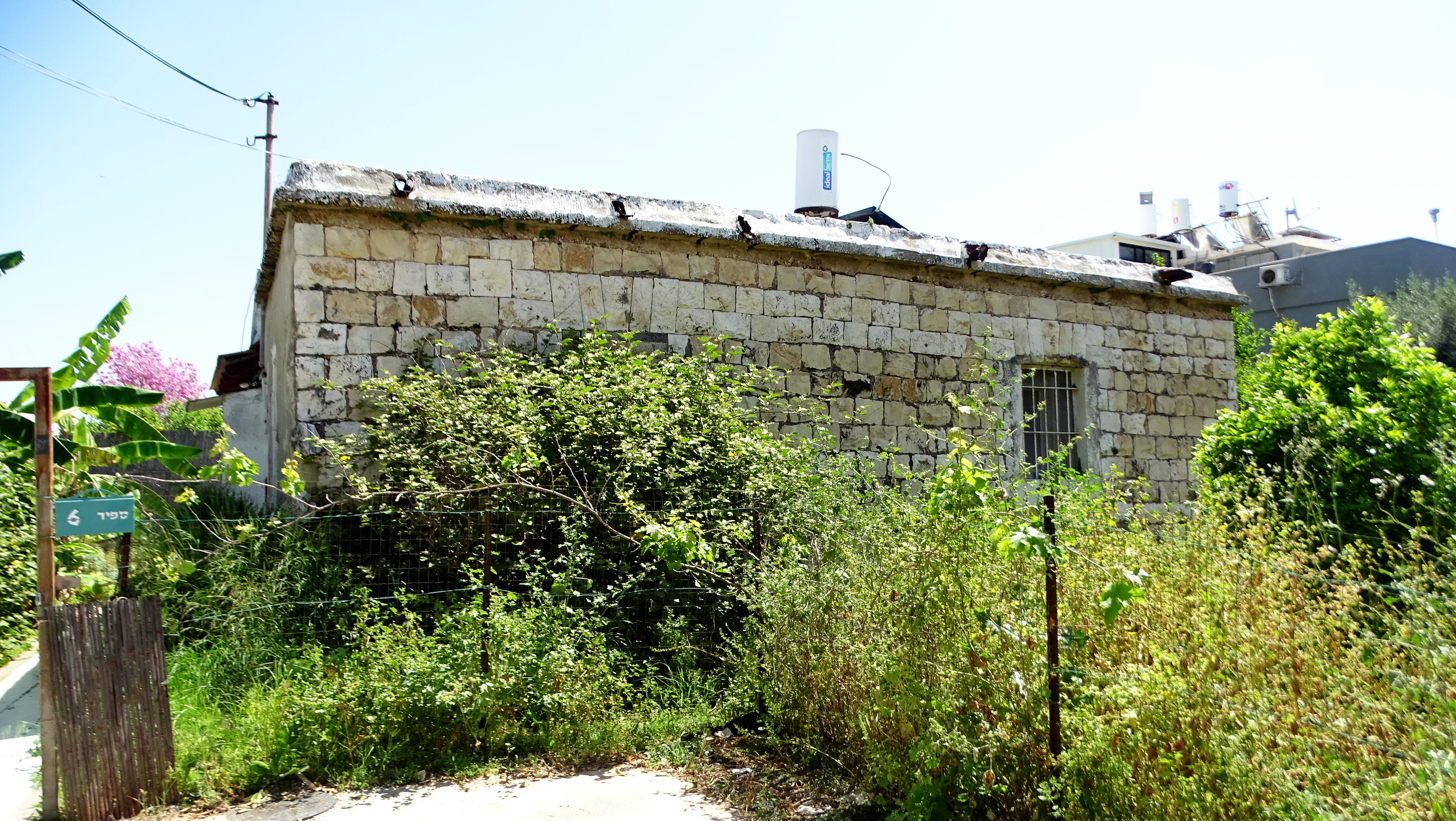

- Location within Central Israel Location within Israel
- Coordinates: 32°2′40″N 34°55′13″E
- Country: Israel
- District: Central
- Subdistrict: Petah Tikva
- Council: Hevel Modi'in
- Founded: 1949
- Founder: Moroccan immigrants
- Population (2024): 698

Nofekh (Hebrew: נופך) is a community settlement in central Israel. Located in the Shephelah, it falls under the jurisdiction of Hevel Modi'in Regional Council. In 2024 it had a population of 698.

== Etymology ==
Its name is taken from one of the 12 stones in the Hoshen, the sacred breastplate worn by a Jewish high priest, mentioned in Exodus 28:18. Nearby Shoham, Bareket, Leshem and Ahlama (the former name of Beit Arif) were also named after the Hoshen stones.

== History ==
The village was established by immigrants from Morocco in 1949 on lands of the depopulated Palestinian village of Rantiya.
