= Hadid =

Moshav in central Israel

Hadid: חָדִיד (Hebrew)
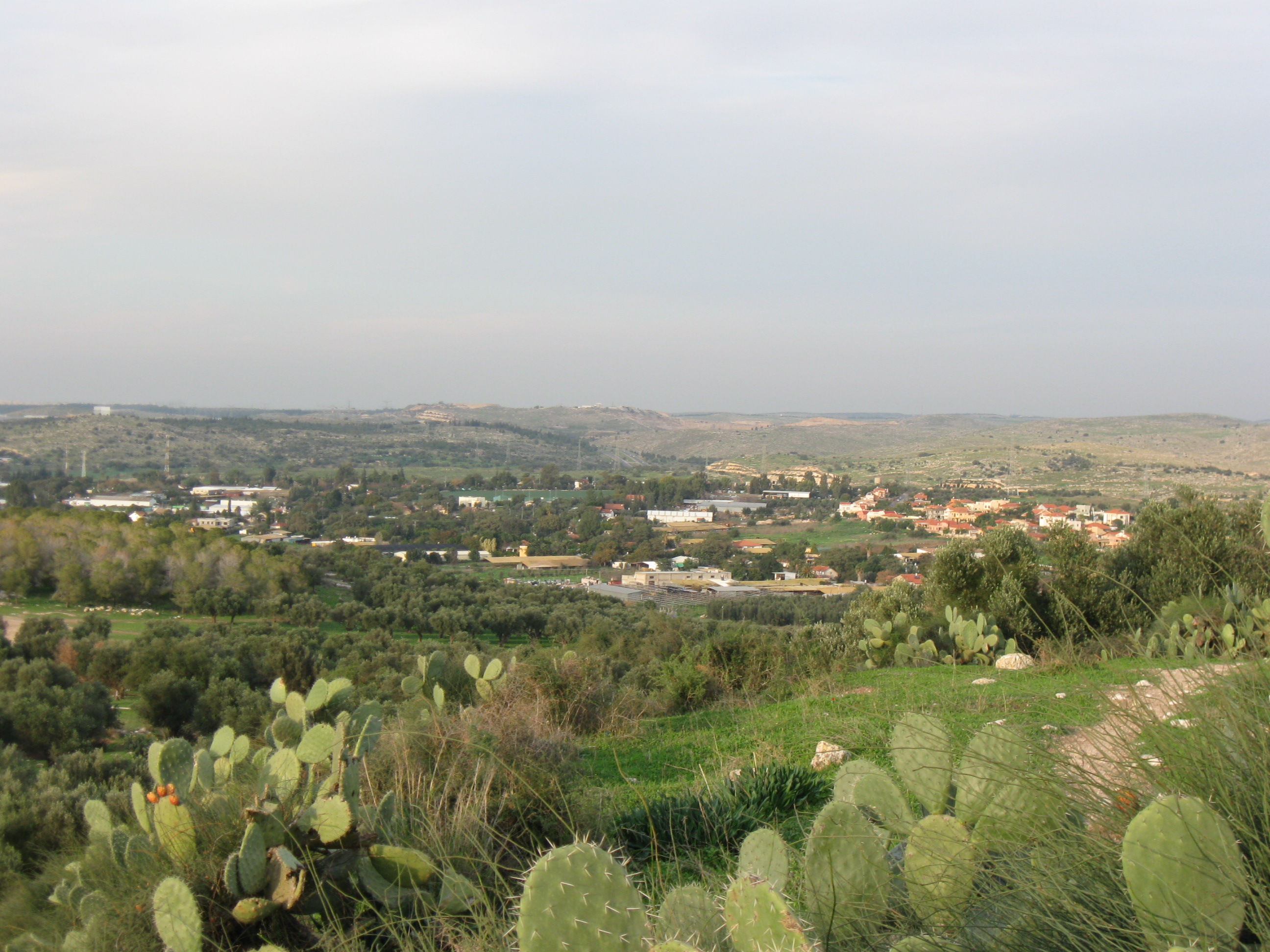

- Location within Central Israel
- Coordinates: 31°58′4″N 34°56′1″E
- Country: Israel
- District: Central
- Subdistrict: Ramla
- Council: Hevel Modi'in
- Affiliation: Hapoel HaMizrachi
- Founded: 1950
- Founder: Yemenite immigrants
- Population (2024): 1,152
- Website: www.hadid.co.il

Hadid (Hebrew: חָדִיד) is a moshav in central Israel. Located near Modi'in, it falls under the jurisdiction of Hevel Modi'in Regional Council. In 2024 it had a population of 1,152.

== History ==
According to the Mishnah, the town of Hadid was encompassed by a wall before the Israelite conquest of Canaan under Joshua.

It is not mentioned in the list of the towns of Benjamin in Joshua 18:21–28 but it is named as a city of the tribe of Benjamin in the Second Temple period. In the Hellenistic era it was known as 'Adida; Simon Maccabeus was encamped there during his conflict with the Seleucid general Diodotus Tryphon.

During the 18th and 19th centuries, the area belonged to the Nahiyeh (sub-district) of Lod that encompassed the area of the present-day city of Modi'in-Maccabim-Re'ut in the south to the present-day city of El'ad in the north, and from the foothills in the east, through the Lod Valley to the outskirts of Jaffa in the west. This area was home to thousands of inhabitants in about 20 villages, who had at their disposal tens of thousands of hectares of prime agricultural land.

Modern Hadid was founded in 1949 as a kibbutz by Yemenite Jewish immigrants, later joined by immigrants from Romania. In 1950, it was reorganized as a moshav affiliated with the Hapoel HaMizrachi movement. The site was about 2 kilometres (1.2 mi) west of the former Palestinian village site of al-Haditha and the archaeological tel of ancient Hadid (Adida).

== Archaeology ==
In 2008, an archaeological excavation was conducted by Hagit Torgë at Tel Hadid which yielded scant remains and a building from the Iron Age and the early Persian period.
