= Ahisamakh, Israel =

Moshav in central Israel

Ahisamakh: אֲחִיסָמָךְ (Hebrew)
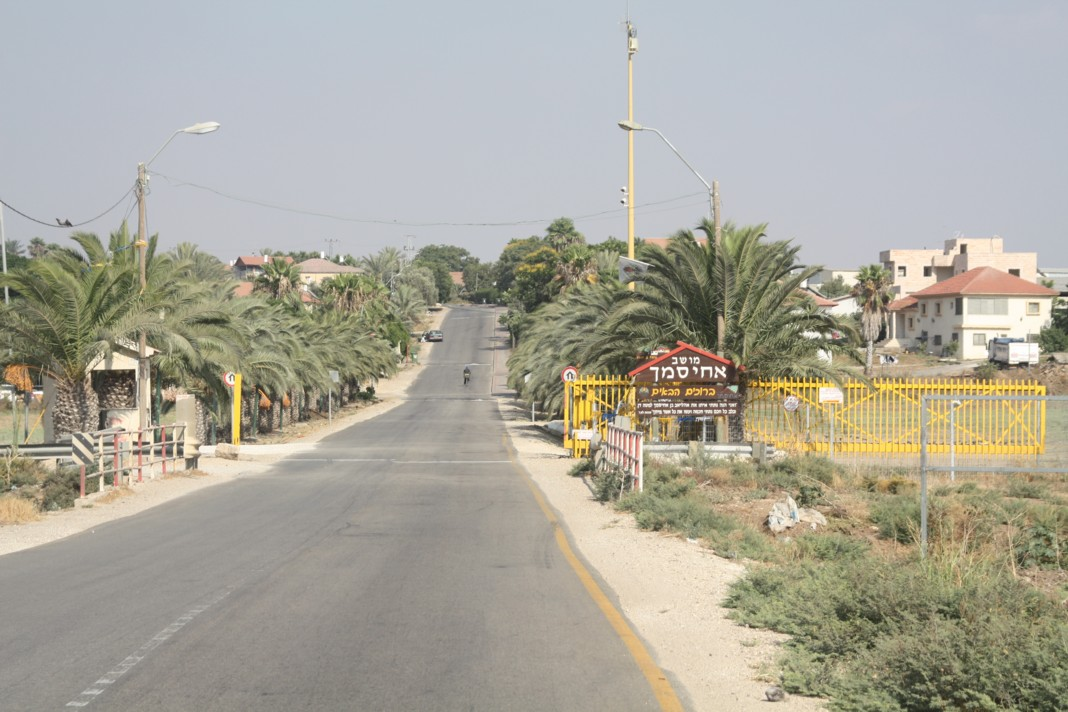
- Entrance to Ahisamakh

- Location within Central Israel Location within Israel
- Coordinates: 31°56′6″N 34°54′26″E
- Country: Israel
- District: Central
- Subdistrict: Ramla
- Council: Hevel Modi'in
- Region: Shephelah
- Affiliation: Moshavim Movement
- Founded: 1950
- Founder: Libyan Jewish refugees
- Population (2024): 1,399

Ahisamakh (Hebrew: אֲחִיסָמָךְ, lit. 'Brother of Support') is a moshav in central Israel. Located in the Shephelah, it falls under the jurisdiction of Hevel Modi'in Regional Council. In 2024 it had a population of 1,399.

== History ==
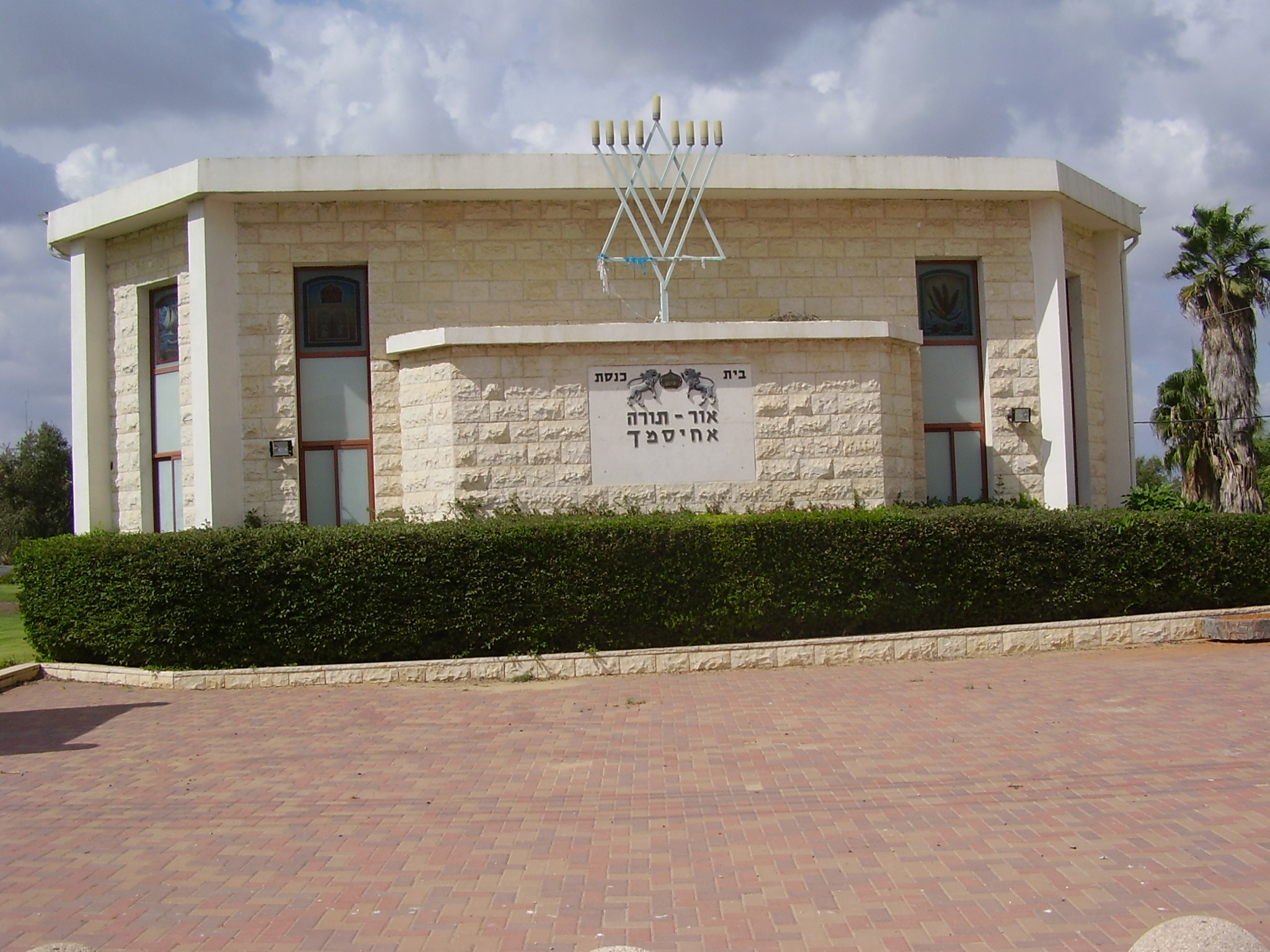
Synagogue in Ahisamakh

During the Ottoman period, the area of Ahisamakh belonged to the Nahiyeh (sub-district) of Lod that encompassed the area of the present-day city of Modi'in-Maccabim-Re'ut in the south to the present-day city of El'ad in the north, and from the foothills in the east, through the Lod Valley to the outskirts of Jaffa in the west. This area was home to thousands of inhabitants in about 20 villages, who had at their disposal tens of thousands of hectares of prime agricultural land.

The village was established in 1950 by refugees from Msallata in Libya. It is named after the Biblical leader of the tribe of Dan, Ahisamakh, in the days of Moses, whose sons settled in this area (Exodus 31:6).
