= Shoham =

Shoham שוהם
- Local council

Hebrew transcription(s)
  - ISO 259: Šohm
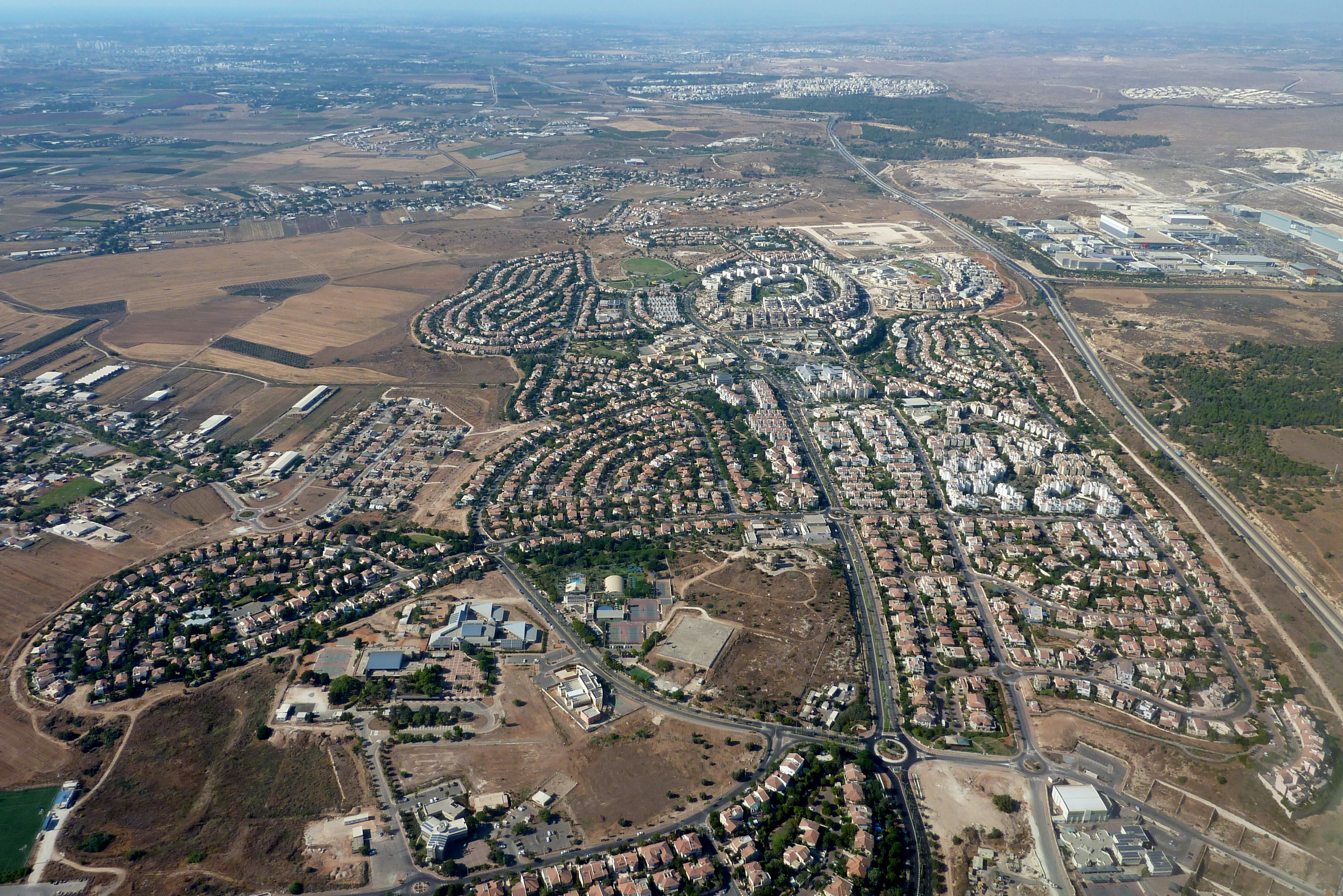
- View of Shoham

- Coat of arms

- Location within Central Israel Location within Israel
- Coordinates: 31°59′59″N 34°56′46″E
- Country: Israel
- District: Central
- Subdistrict: Ramla
- Natural Region: Ramla
- Founded: 1993; 33 years ago

Government
  - Head of Municipality: Dafna Rabinovitch

Area
  - Total: 5,889 dunams (5.889 km^{2}; 2.274 sq mi)

Population (2024)
  - Total: 23,592
  - Density: 4,006/km^{2} (10,380/sq mi)
- Name meaning: Onyx
- Website: shoham.muni.il

Shoham (Hebrew: שוהם, lit. 'Onyx') is a town in the Central District of Israel. The name relates to one of the 12 stones on the Hoshen, the sacred breastplate worn by a Jewish high priest (Exodus 28:20), similar to other nearby towns: Nofekh, Bareket, Leshem and Ahlama (the former name of Beit Arif). As of 2024, Shoham had a population of 23,592. Its jurisdiction is 5,889 dunams (~5.9 km^{2}).

== History ==
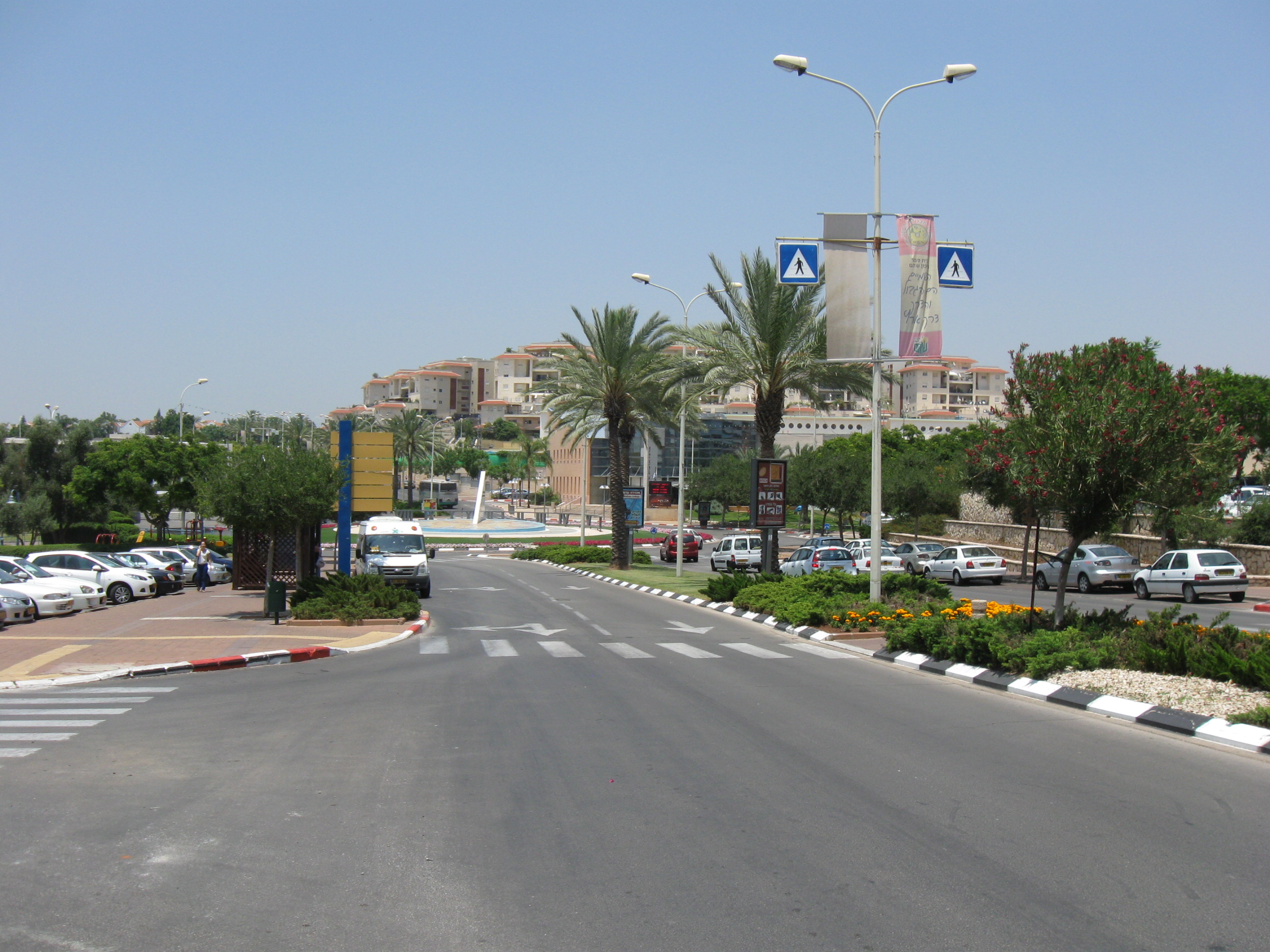
Street in Shoham

A plan to establish a town in the area that is now Shoham was first proposed in the 1960s, as an idea to establish a town for immigrants from South America. It was again proposed in the 1970s. However, residents of nearby moshavim wanted to build a rural community for the adult children of farmers in cooperative communities.

In the early 1990s, Israeli Housing Minister Ariel Sharon put forward a new plan to create a town in the area. Construction began in 1993, when the first 300 homes were built. From then on, the town grew rapidly. By 1995, it had 3,100 residents, and by 2014, had reached a population of 20,000.

== Education ==
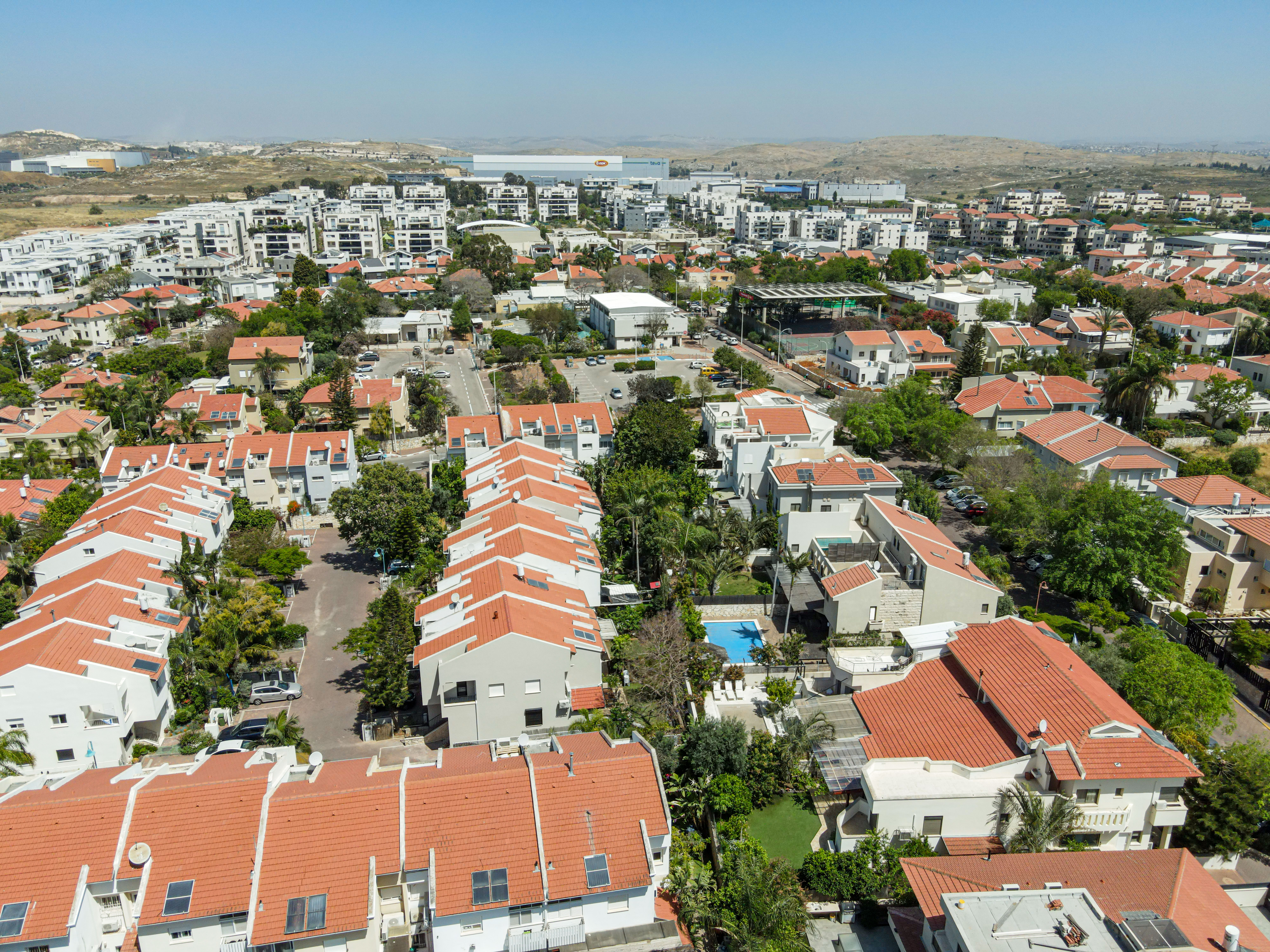
Neighborhood in Shoham

In the 2009–2010 school year, Shoham ranked top in the country in percentage of high school students passing the Bagrut matriculation exams. In the 2014–2015 school year, 88.1% of high school students matriculated. In the 2020–2021 school year, 98% of high school students matriculated. About half of the municipal budget is dedicated to education.

== Culture ==
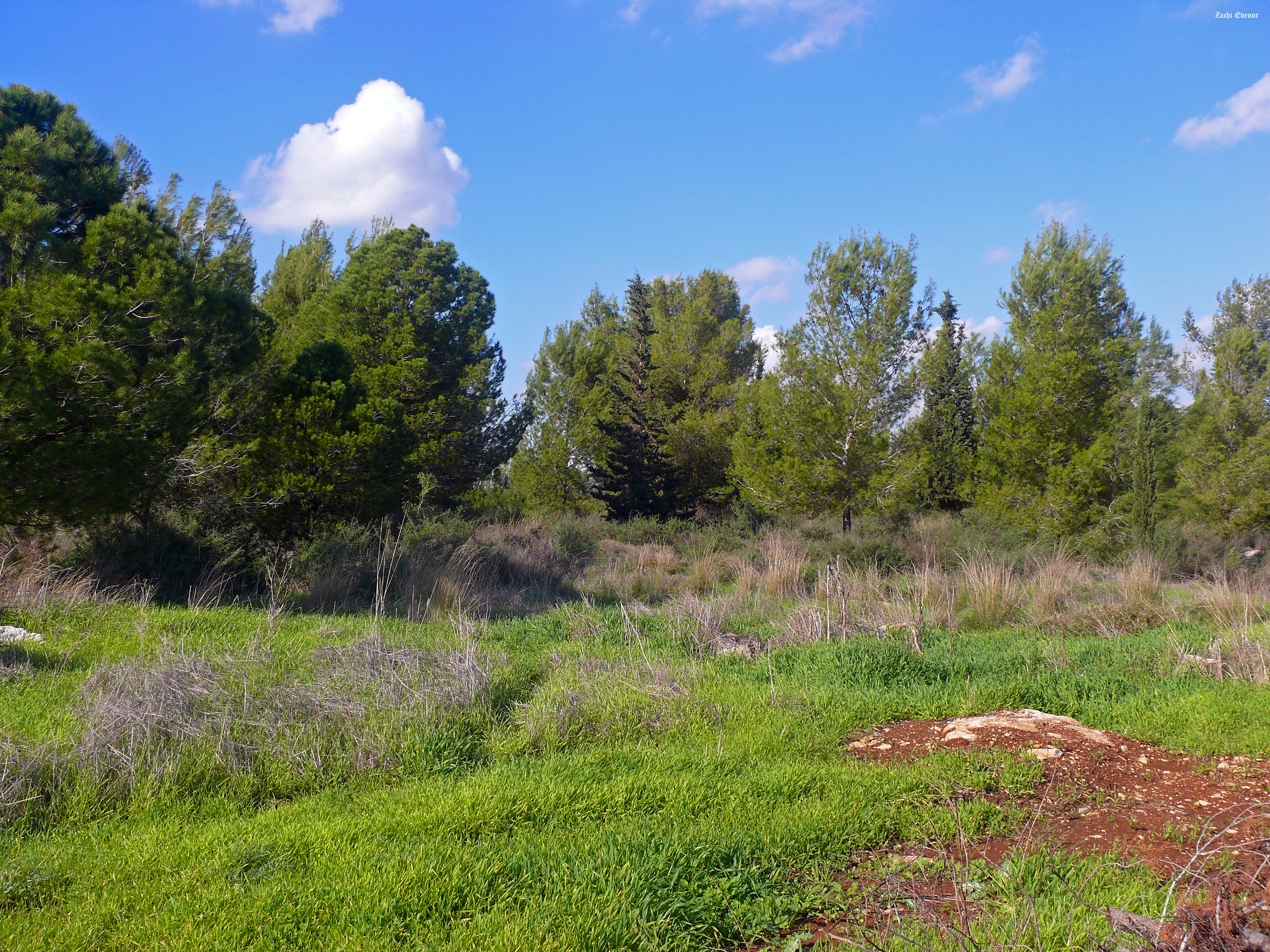
Shoham Forest Park

Shoham is an upper-middle-class town, and residency there is considered a status symbol in Israel. In terms of average wages and the rate of high school students who complete their matriculation, Shoham residents rank well above the national average.

Its residential areas primarily have single-family homes with yards and duplexes, although there are a few apartment complexes. According to Haaretz, it has a small-town, community-oriented feel, but offers most of the services found in bedroom communities, including shopping centers, a high school, and a middle school.

The environment is considered a top priority in Shoham, and each neighborhood has municipal gardens and green spaces. The town's parks and gardens cover over 400 dunams, and are dotted with sculptures. The town has a performing arts center, sports facilities, a public library, and a retiree center and activity club. East of the town is Shoham Forest Park.

== Government ==
=== Council heads ===
- Dov Shayish (1993–1998)
- Shachar Ben Ami (1998–2003)
- Gil Livneh (2003–2018)
- Eitan Patigro (2018–2024)
- Dafna Rabinovitch (2024–)

== Twin towns – sister cities ==
Shoham is twinned with:

- Szolnok, Hungary
- Memphis, Tennessee, United States
- Elstree & Borehamwood, United Kingdom

== Voting Patterns ==
In the 2022 election, 63 percent of voters in Shoham voted for the parties of the center-left coalition led by Yair Lapid, while 32 percent voted for the parties of the right-wing coalition led by Benjamin Netanyahu and 0.1 percent voted for the Arab parties.

In the 2026 election, 66 percent of voters in Shoham voted for the parties of the center-left coalition led by Gadi Eisenkot, while 27 percent voted for the parties of the right-wing coalition led by Benjamin Netanyahu and 0.2 percent voted for the Arab parties. An additional 4.5 percent voted for the Reservists, and 3.1 percent voted for Amcha Yisrael. Voter turnout increased 17 percent from the 2022 election.

== Notable people ==
- Matan Baltaxa (born 1995), footballer
- Ziv Bar-Joseph (born 1971), computational biologist and professor
- Haim Katz (born 1947), politician
- Ella-Lee Lahav (born 2003), singer and actress
- Moshe Mizrahi (1950–2022), politician
- Tamir Saban (born 1999), American-Israeli basketball player
- Lonah Chemtai Salpeter (born 1988), Kenyan-born Israeli Olympic marathon runner
- Mia Schem (born 2002), Israeli-French former hostage taken captive on October 7th, 2023
- David Stav (born 1960), chief rabbi and chairman of Tzohar
