= Kerem Ben Shemen =

Moshav in central Israel

Kerem Ben Shemen: כֶּרֶם בֶּן שֶׁמֶן (Hebrew)
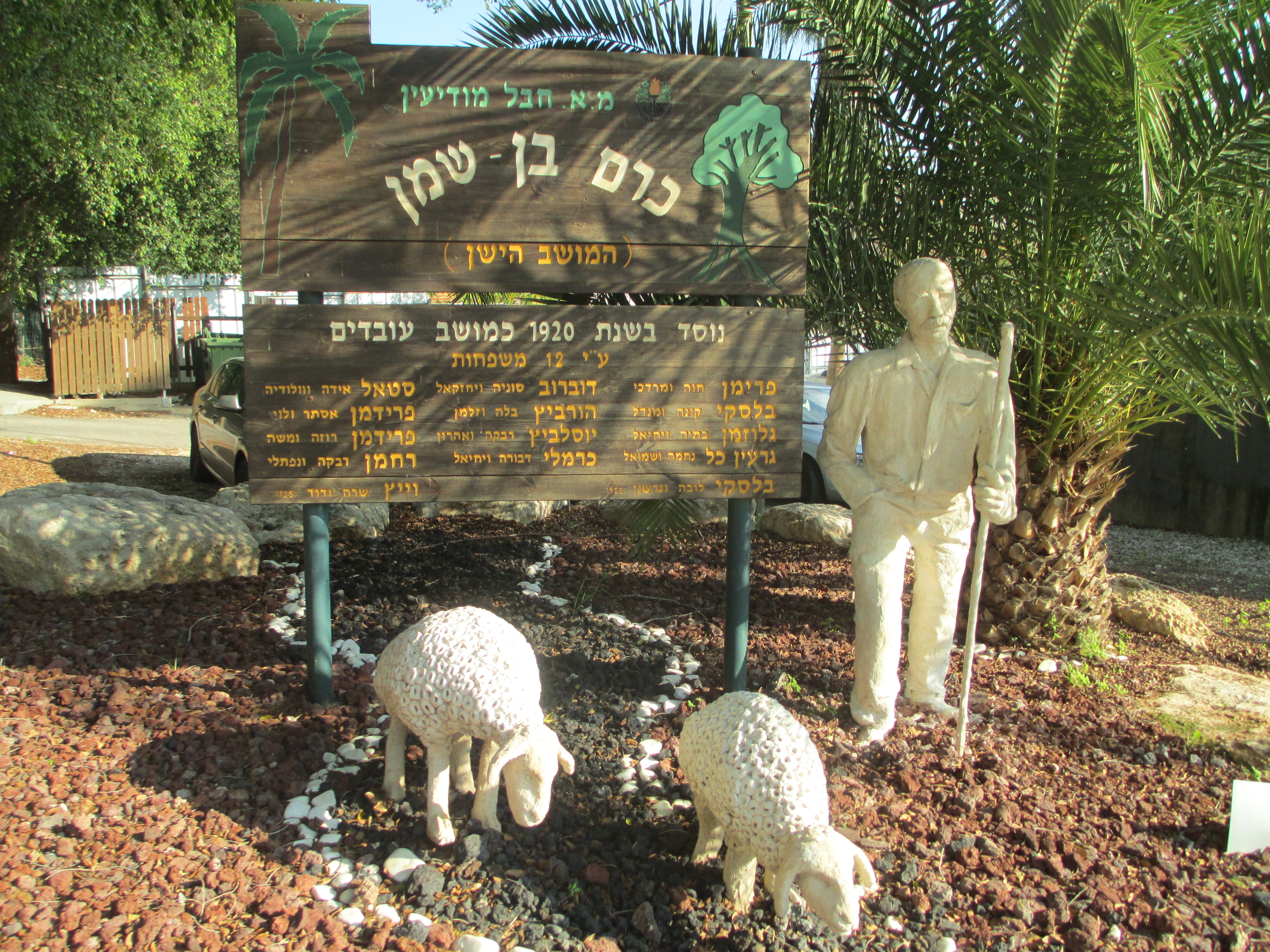
- Village entrance

- Location within Central Israel
- Coordinates: 31°57′30″N 34°56′5″E
- Country: Israel
- District: Central
- Subdistrict: Ramla
- Council: Hevel Modi'in
- Founded: 1923
- Founder: Russian Jews
- Population (2024): 132

Kerem Ben Shemen (Hebrew: כֶּרֶם בֶּן שֶׁמֶן, lit. 'very fruitful vineyard'), also known as Ben Shemen-Shikhun (Hebrew: בן שמן־שיכון, lit. 'Ben Shemen Housing Complex') is a moshav in central Israel. Located near Lod, it falls under the jurisdiction of Hevel Modi'in Regional Council. In 2024 it had a population of 132.

== History ==
The moshav was established in 1923 when Ben Shemen was split in two, with a group of trial farms eventually becoming a separate moshav, Kerem Ben Shemen. Its name is taken from Isaiah 5:1: "My well-beloved had a vineyard in a very fruitful hill."
