= Nehalim =

Moshav in central Israel

Nehalim: נְחָלִים (Hebrew)
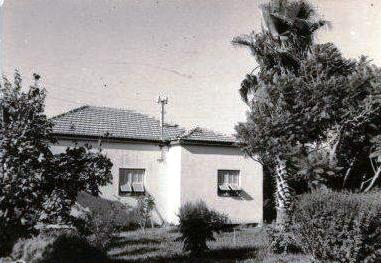

- Location within Central Israel
- Coordinates: 32°3′31″N 34°54′49″E
- Country: Israel
- District: Central
- Subdistrict: Petah Tikva
- Council: Hevel Modi'in
- Affiliation: Hapoel HaMizrachi
- Founded: 1952
- Founder: Jerusalem Organisation members
- Population (2024): 1,519

Nehalim (Hebrew: נְחָלִים, lit. Streams) is a religious moshav in central Israel. Located south of Petah Tikva, it falls under the jurisdiction of Hevel Modi'in Regional Council. In 2024 it had a population of 1,519.

== History ==
The Nehalim community was formed in 1938 by a core group of young, religious Bnei Akiva members from Jerusalem. They began agricultural training in Menahemia in the Jordan Valley. In 1944 they moved to a tract of swampy, malaria-infested land, about a kilometre south east of the site of the present kibbutz HaGoshrim, and lived in barracks without electricity or running water. Inspiration for the name Nehalim came from the network of brooks and streams in the area. After the 1948 Arab–Israeli War, the residents were moved to the abandoned German Templer village of Wilhelma. The new moshav, in its present location south of Petah Tikva, was founded in 1953, with each family receiving a two-room house and 25 dunams of land.

== Synagogues ==
Nehalim has one main synagogue, established by Jews of Ashkenazi background. In 2012, the moshav's growing Mizrahi population wanted to build a second synagogue to reflect its own religious heritage but the chief rabbi of the moshav, David Greenwald, vetoed it.

== Education ==
Nehalim also has a religious boys high school. The school was one of the first Bnei Akiva high schools in Israel, and was established in 1955 by Yosef Ba-Gad.

== See also ==
- Jewish ethnic divisions
