= Ben Shemen =

Moshav in central Israel

Ben Shemen: בֶּן שֶׁמֶן (Hebrew)
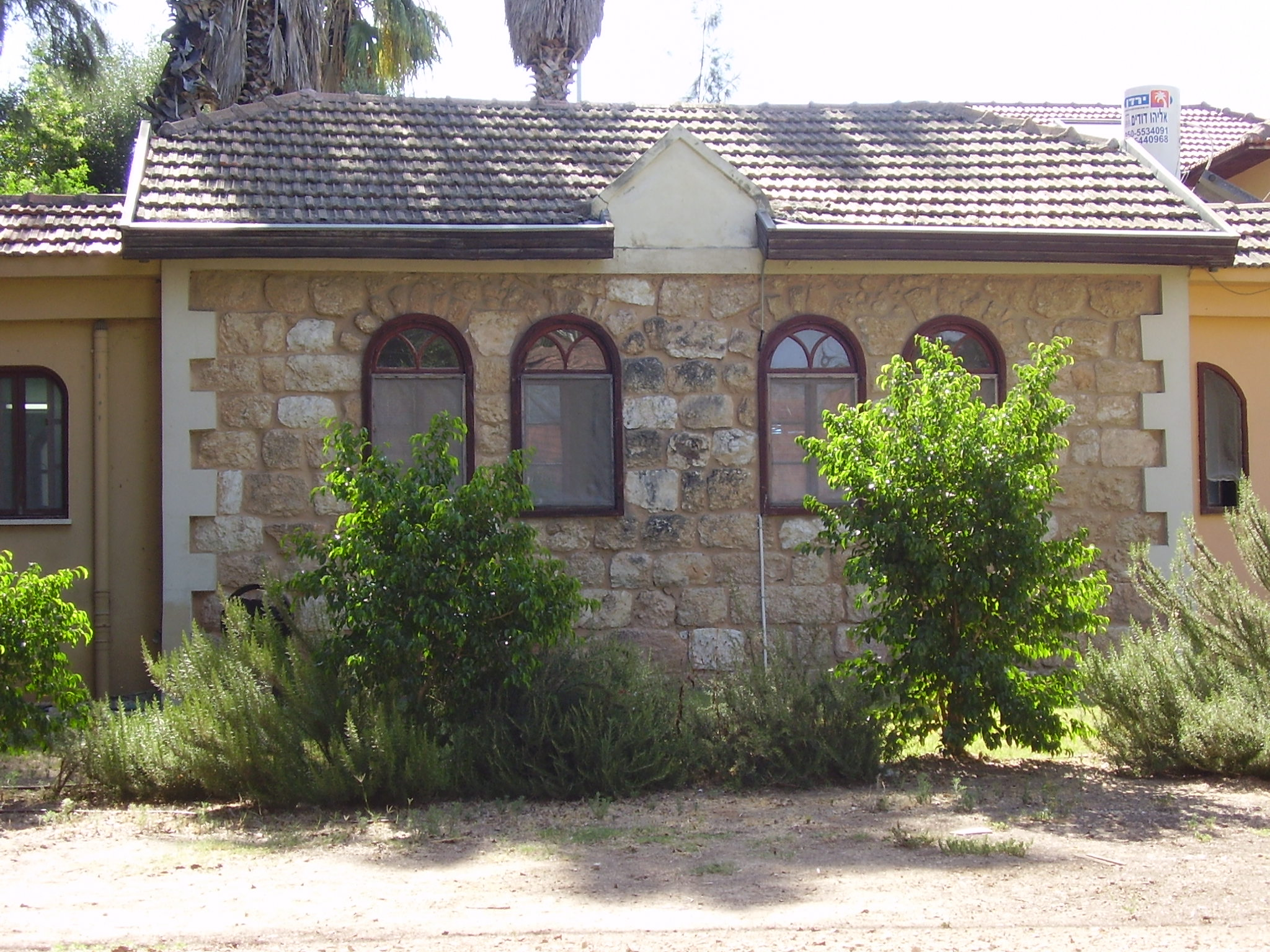

- Location within Central Israel
- Coordinates: 31°57′14″N 34°55′30″E
- Country: Israel
- District: Central
- Subdistrict: Ramla
- Council: Hevel Modi'in
- Affiliation: Moshavim Movement
- Founded: 1905 (original); 1952 (re-establishment)
- Population (2024): 849

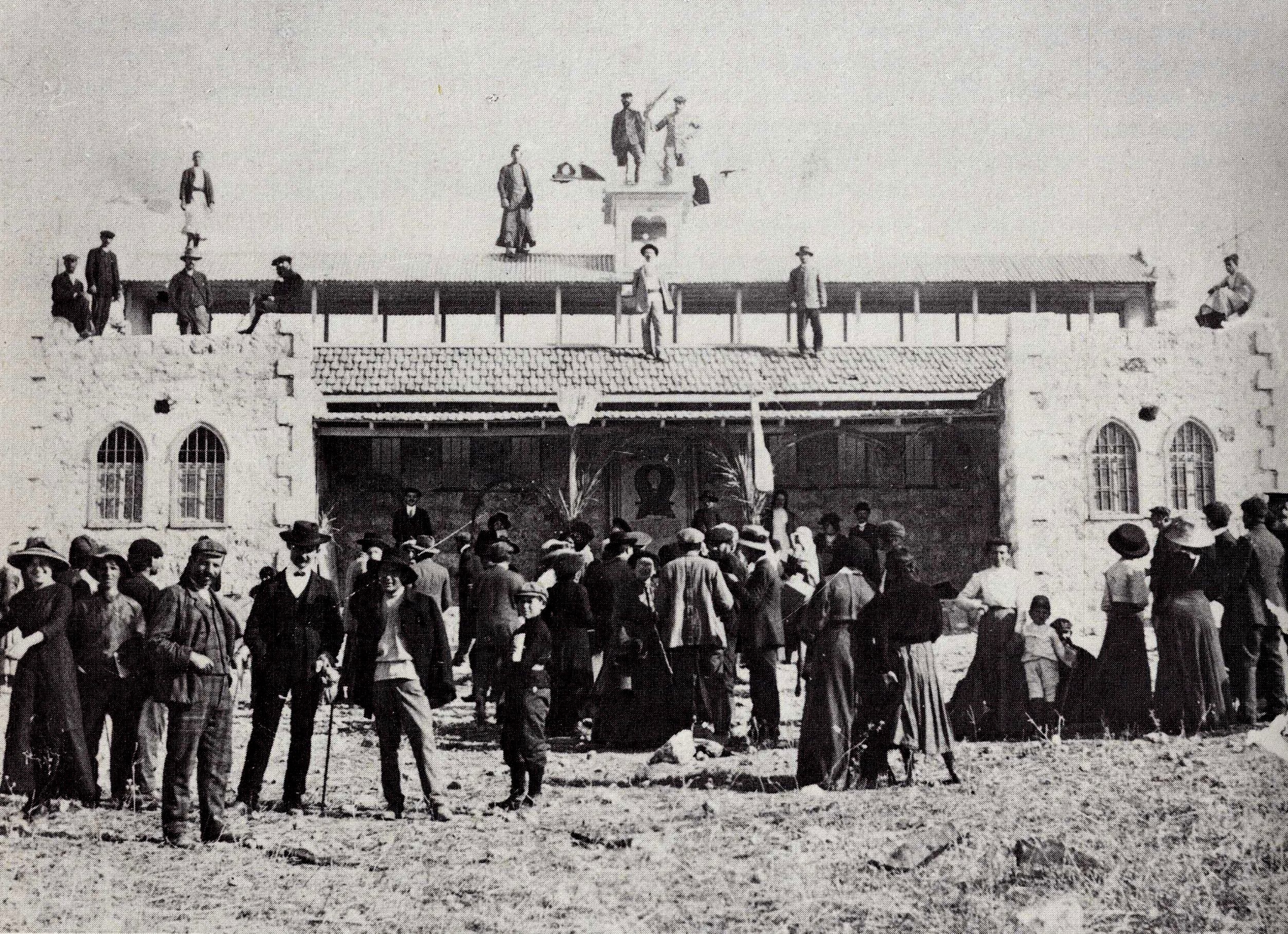
Bezalel workshop at Ben Shemen, 1911

Ben Shemen (Hebrew: בֶּן שֶׁמֶן, lit. very fruitful) is a moshav in central Israel. Located around four kilometres east of Lod, it falls under the jurisdiction of Hevel Modi'in Regional Council. In 2024 it had a population of 849.

== Etymology ==
The village's name is taken from Isaiah 5:1:

Let me sing of my well-beloved, a song of my beloved touching his vineyard. My well-beloved had a vineyard in a very fruitful hill.

and also reflects the JNF's planting of olive trees in this area.

== History ==
The moshav was founded in 1905 on the land of the former Arab estate of Bayt ‘Arīf. It was one of the first villages established on Jewish National Fund land. The first Jewish National Fund forest is also located in Ben Shemen. In 1910 Ben Shemen was the site of the Bezalel Artists' Colony (1910), a predecessor to the Ben Shemen youth village. According to a census conducted in 1922 by the British Mandate authorities, Ben Shemen had a population of 90 Jews. Which had increased in the 1931 census to 353 residents, in 30 houses. In 1923 it was split in two, with a group of trial farms eventually becoming a separate moshav, Kerem Ben Shemen.

The Ben Shemen Youth Village was established adjacent to the moshav in 1927 and is today a large agricultural boarding school. In 1945, the lands of Ben Shemen amounted to 2,176 dunams, of which 607 dunams were devoted to orchards, 947 dunams to field crops, one dunam for bananas, and 594 dunams were left uncultivated. According to Marom, "Citrus growing remained undeveloped in Ben Shemen, with the youth village specializing in orchards and field crops".

During World War II, Ben Shemen was the site of a British search for weapons. Similar searches were a common British response to Jewish opposition to the White Paper of 1939. In 1947 Ben Shemen had a population of 75. The village experienced extensive damage during the early days of the 1948 Arab–Israeli war and had to be reconstructed. Immigrants from Romania joined the moshav in 1952. Some houses were built by Bezalel Academy of Art and Design founder Boris Schatz.

== Archaeology ==
During road-work near Ben Shemen in 1975, a burial cave containing three ossuaries was found. An Aramaic funerary inscription on one of them mentions "Levi son of Menashe" and is dated to the late Second Temple period, probably during the first century BCE or CE.

Additionally, a boulder that collapsed from the cave wall had a Greek funerary inscription written in red, which according to its style, was probably inscribed during the 2nd or 3rd centuries CE. Di Segni suggested that the appearance of the Hebrew name "Yo'ezer" on the inscription indicates that the area had not been completely cleared of Jews after the Jewish–Roman wars. Jews who did not participate in the revolt may have survived in the area, converting to Christianity and preserving the family name for generations to come. Others have argued that, despite its rarity, a Christian usage of an Old Testament name doesn't require additional explanation.

== Gallery ==
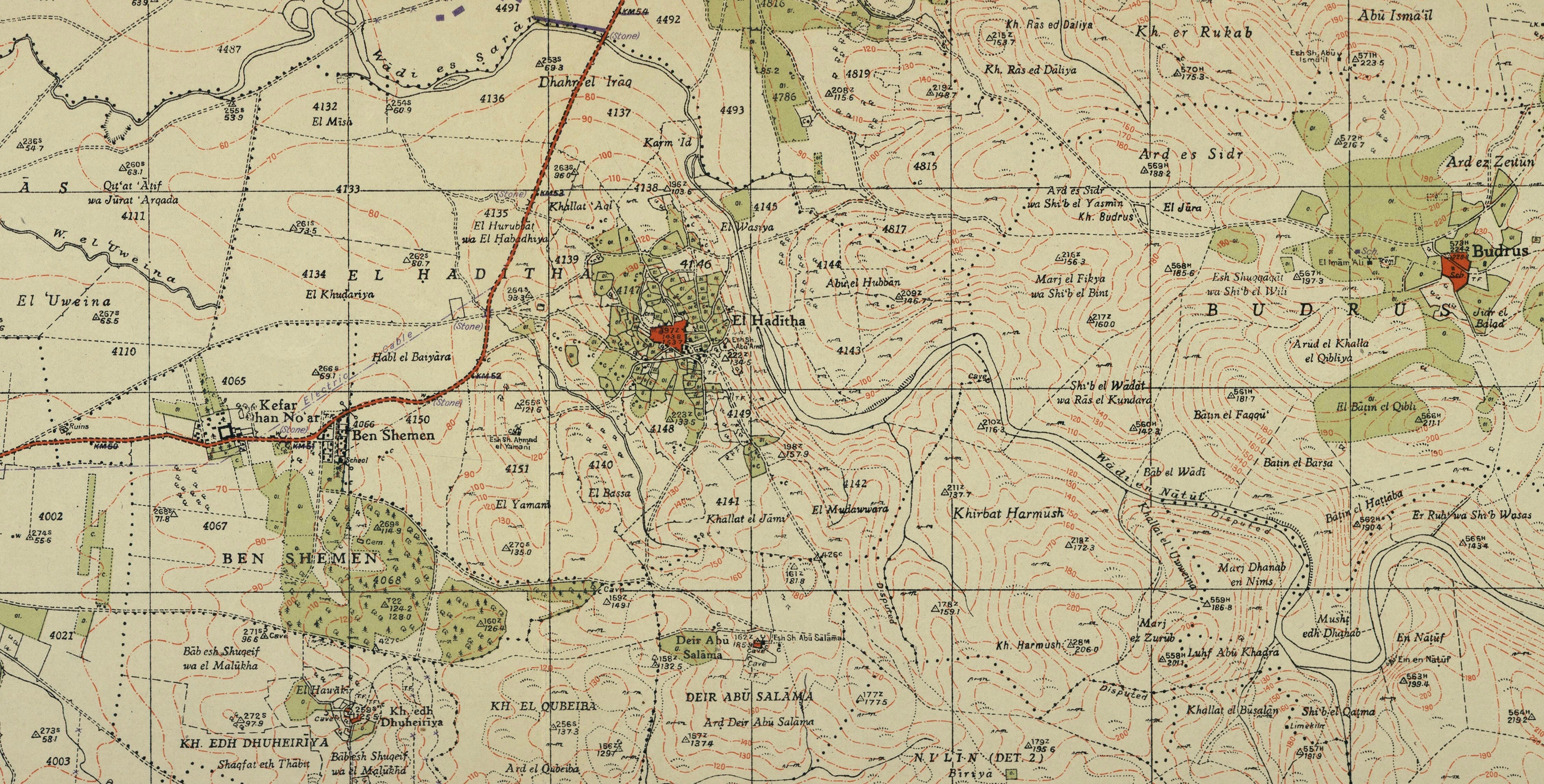
Ben Shemen 1942 1:20,000

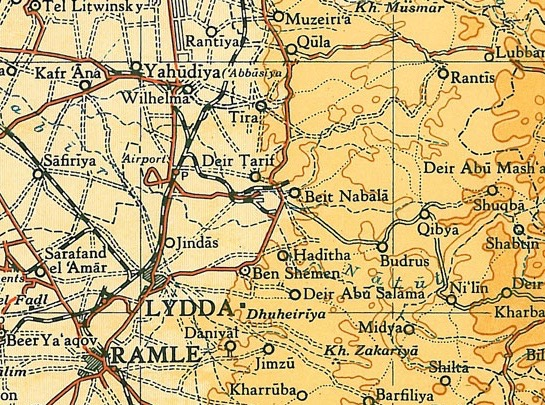
Ben Shemen 1945 1:250,000

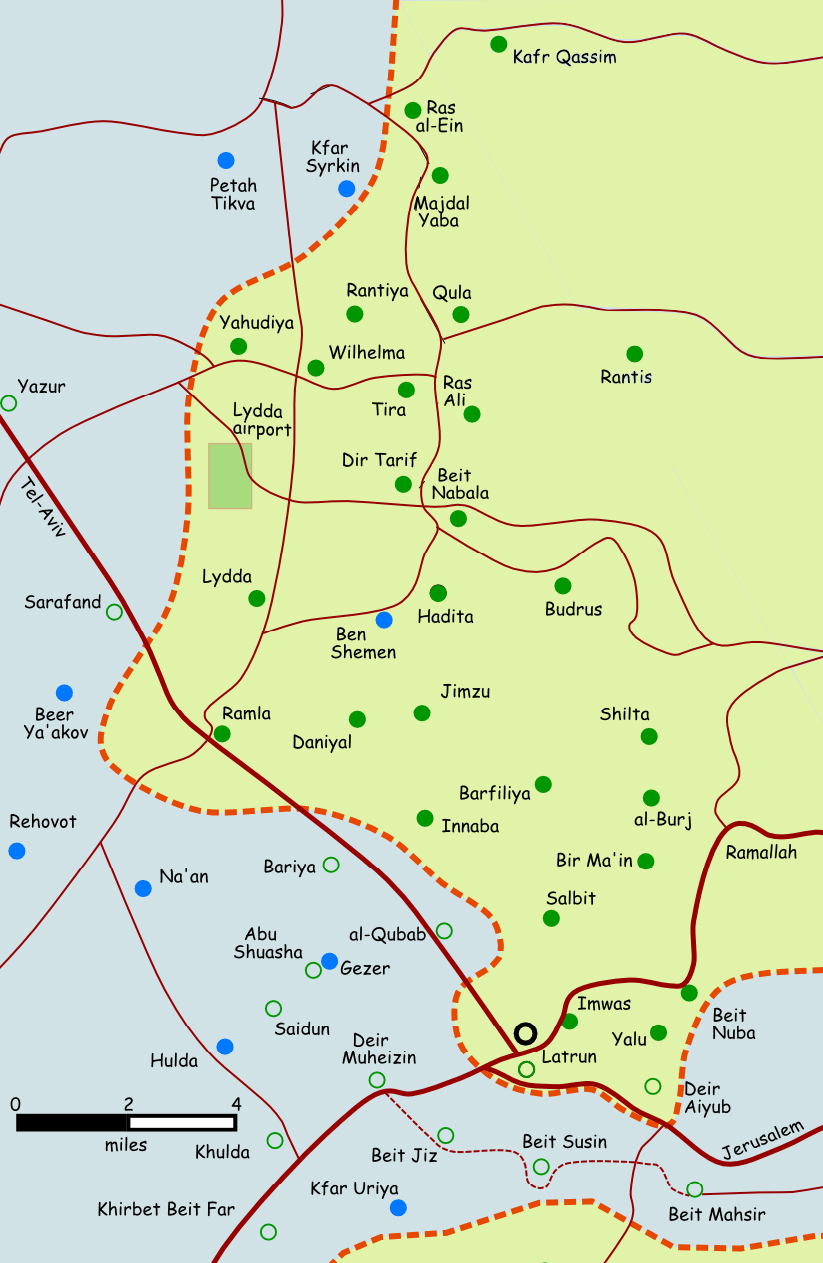
Depopulated villages in the Ramle Subdistrict

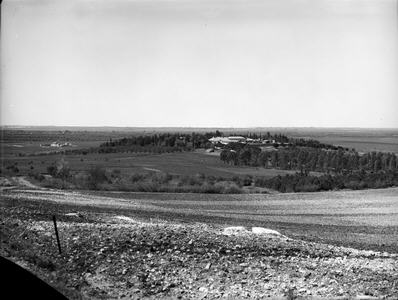
Ben Shemen 1927

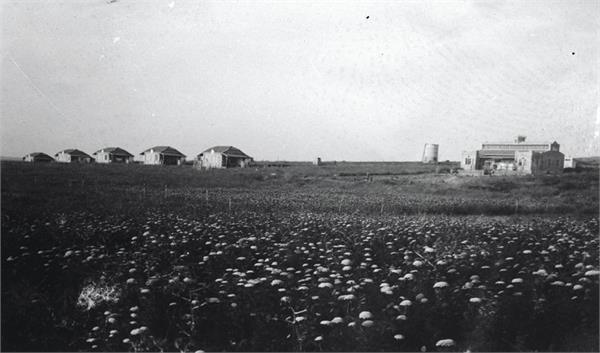
Ben Shemen 1928

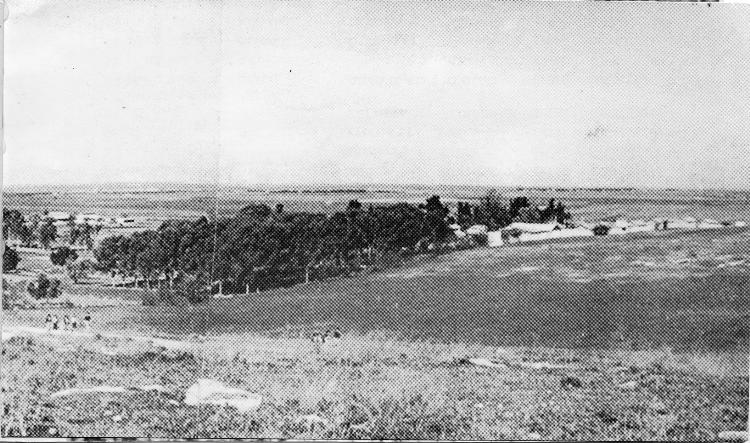
Ben Shemen 1948. Photograph from Palmach archive

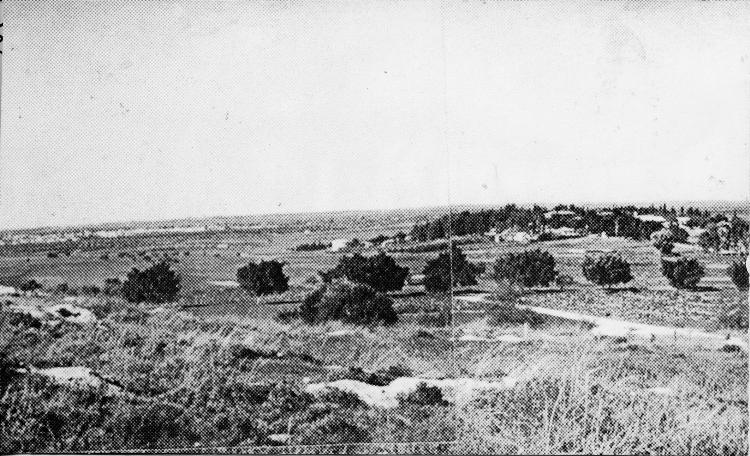
Ben Shemen. 1948. Used as a base by the Yiftach Brigade

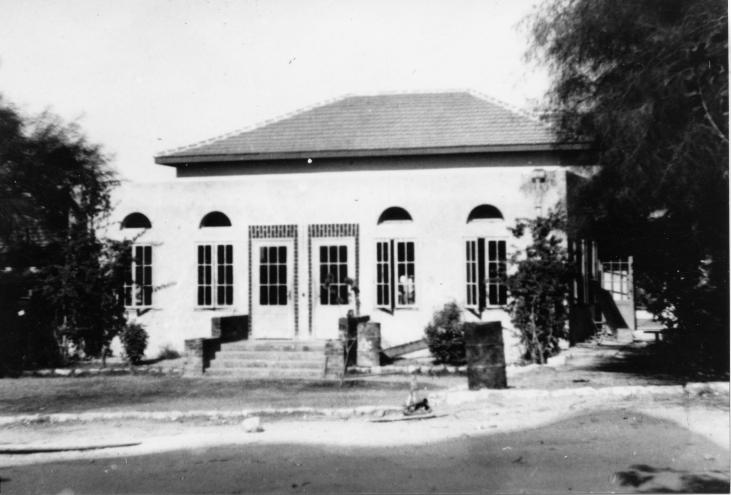
Ben Shemen 1948. Dining room

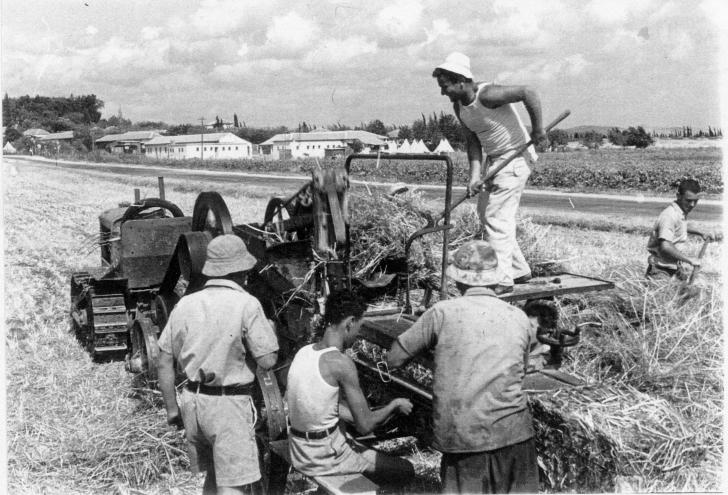
Ben Shemen. Harvest

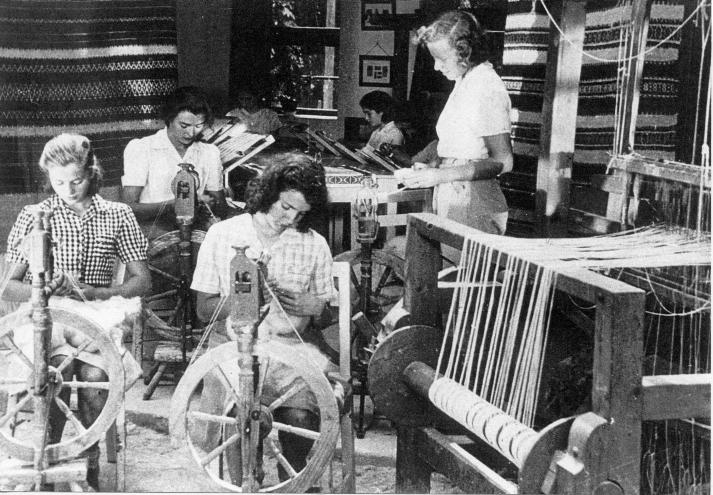
Ben Shemen. Processing wool

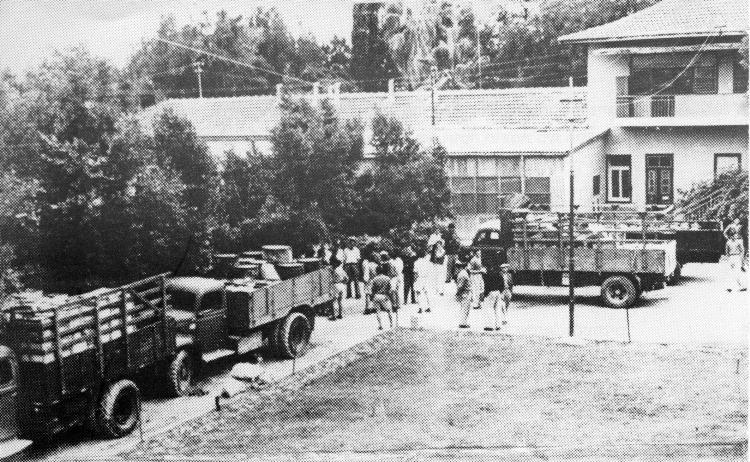
Ben Shemen being evacuated in early 1948

== Notable residents ==
- Benjamin Elazari Volcani
- Aharon Yadlin
- Shimon Peres

== See also ==
- Ben Shemen Interchange
