= COVID-19 pandemic in Jordan =

Ongoing COVID-19 viral pandemic in Jordan

- Disease: COVID-19
- Pathogen: SARS-CoV-2
- Location: Jordan
- First outbreak: Wuhan, Hubei, China
- Index case: Amman
- Arrival date: 2 March 2020 (6 years, 7 months, 3 weeks and 5 days)
- Confirmed cases: 1,746,997
- Recovered: 1,732,875 (updated 9 July 2023)
- Deaths: 14,122

Government website
- corona.moh.gov.jo

The COVID-19 pandemic in Jordan was a part of the worldwide pandemic of coronavirus disease 2019 (COVID-19) caused by severe acute respiratory syndrome coronavirus 2 (SARS-CoV-2). On 2 March 2020, the Ministry of Health confirmed the first case in Jordan

As soon as reports about a novel coronavirus in China emerged in early 2020, Jordan's National Epidemics Committee and Health Ministry on 26 January designated certain hospitals to treat infections and established several protocols to deal with the arrival of the coronavirus to the country, five weeks before the country recorded its first case on 2 March. Despite the fact that Jordan had only one confirmed coronavirus case on 13 March, the government suspended schools, banned public gatherings and closed the borders and airports in response to the rapid spread of the virus in countries surrounding Jordan and around the world. On the morning of 15 March, the government implemented a plan to quarantine arrivals in the country before the borders and the airport were completely shut down on 17 March. The Jordanian Army was tasked with the plan's implementation as it moved to facilitate the transportation of 5,000 arrivals from airports and border crossings to luxury Dead Sea resorts, a popular tourist area which was declared a closed military zone and used as accommodation for a mandatory two-week quarantine paid by the government.

After learning that a coronavirus infected patient had attended a wedding with 400 guests in the city of Irbid, the government announced a lockdown on 17 March, which was later turned into a strictly-enforced curfew that was described as one of the world's strictest measures. But the curfew that lasted four days was later relaxed as government plans to deliver food to neighborhoods had failed, and people were allowed to walk to buy groceries from local stores from 10 am until 6 pm when civil defense sirens were used to announce the end of when people can go out. For six weeks, during which infections rose to around 400 cases, the lockdown included a ban on the use of cars with the exception of health service providers and essential sector workers. Neighborhoods with confirmed cases were isolated and intergovernoratal travel was banned. Health Minister Saad Jaber and Minister of State for Media Affairs Amjad Adaileh gave daily briefings on developments from the National Center for Security and Crises Management along with other ministers and military and police officials.

On 30 April, the Jordanian government moved to ease the lockdown and re-open the economy after confirming only 451 cases, of which 350 recovered and 8 died. The government's decision was not only influenced by these numbers which were considered to be encouraging, but also out of fear for the country's ailing economy which was badly-hit by the crisis that crippled its thriving tourism sector. The tourism sector's GDP fell by 3% while Jordan's real GDP fell by 1.6% in 2020. The pandemic also affected unemployment rates, as unemployment hit 25% in 2021, the highest level for the country in more than 25 years.

As of 3 May, most sectors were allowed to resume work gradually, but schools, universities, gyms, public gatherings, church and mosque sermons remain banned, and a curfew after 6 pm remains in place as well as a curfew on Fridays. On 5 May, the government issued a defense order fining whoever does not abide by safety regulations and the wear of masks in public transportation and in businesses and government institutions by 20-50 Jordanian dinars (around $30-$70 USD). Jordan has had zero new case counts for five consecutive days as of 5 May but health officials have expressed worry that a second wave could surge if inadequate social distancing measures were taken by the public.

== Background ==
On 12 January 2020, the World Health Organization (WHO) confirmed that a novel coronavirus was the cause of a respiratory illness in a cluster of people in Wuhan, Hubei, China, which was reported to the WHO on 31 December 2019.

The case fatality ratio for COVID-19 has been much lower than SARS of 2003, but the transmission has been significantly greater, with a significant total death toll.

== Timeline ==
=== March 2020 ===
==== 2 March ====
On 2 March, the Prime Ministry of Jordan reported the first case of coronavirus in Jordan. The Jordanian had returned from Italy two weeks prior, before quarantine procedures for Jordanians returning from Italy had been put in place.

==== 3–14 March ====
There were no new reported cases of COVID-19 in the second week. Jordan remained coronavirus-free after the recovery of the first infection.

==== 15–21 March ====
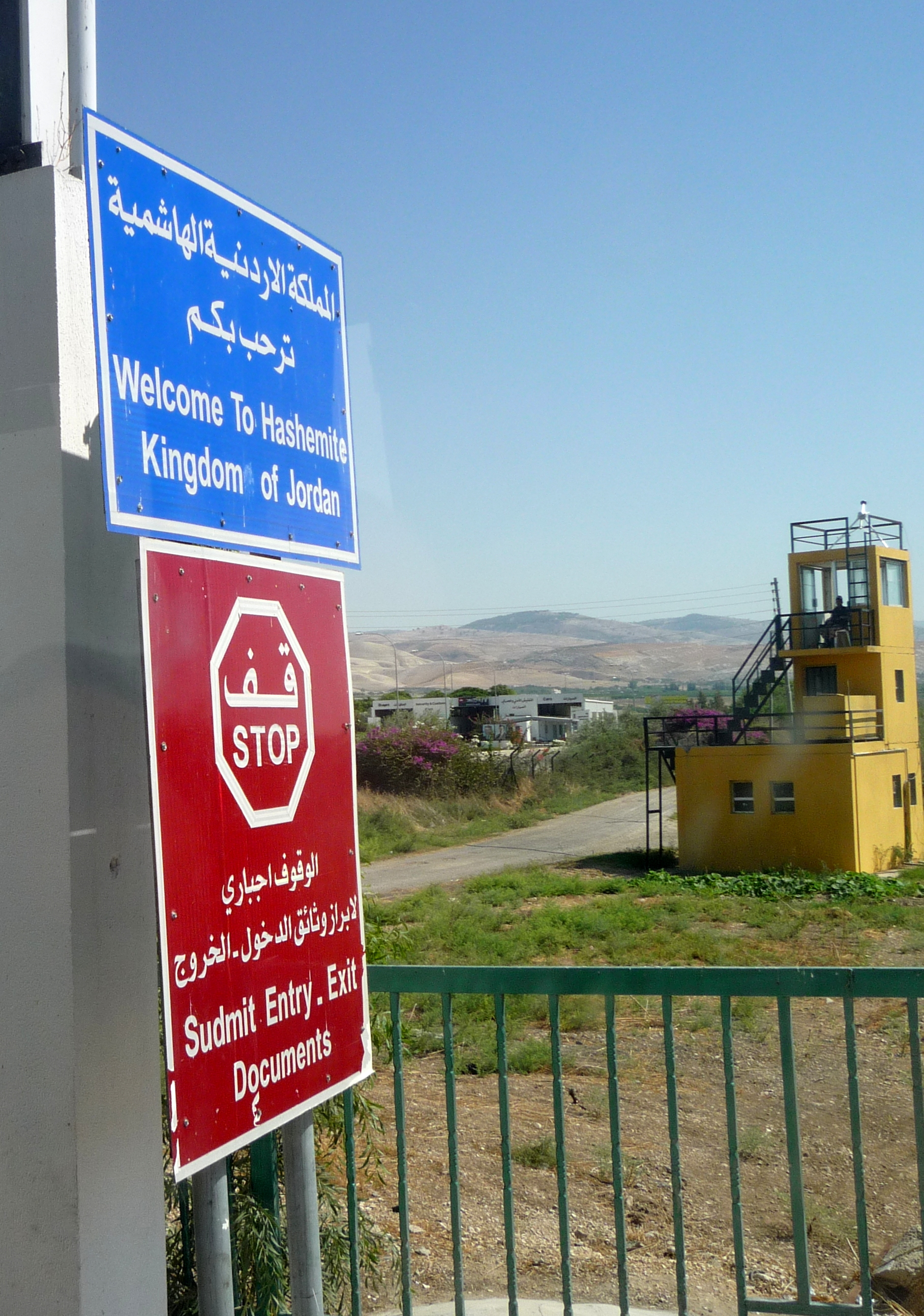
Jordanian authorities close all tourist sites to prevent the spread of COVID-19

On 15 March, the Minister of Health Saad Jaber announced that there were 11 new cases who had tested positive for COVID-19, bringing the total number of positive cases to 12. The number of cases reported included 5 Jordanians who had recently returned to the country from other parts of the world, 6 French tourists, and one Iraqi. Later that day, an additional case was confirmed, bringing the total number of positive cases to 13.

On 16 March, the Jordanian government confirmed 4 additional cases - 2 of the cases were for a Jordanian man and his daughter who returned to Jordan from Spain, and 2 cases were for 2 Jordanians who were in close contact with a positive case, later in the same day 6 more cases were confirmed that were in close contact with a patient who came from Spain. 6 additional cases were confirmed lately that day for people who went to a wedding in the city of Irbid and confirmed that the groom was one of the 6 new cases, bringing the total number of confirmed cases to 29.

On 17 March, the government confirmed 6 additional cases, one of the cases was a nurse who arrived to Jordan from Palestine 5 days prior. She was tested to check if she had the virus after showing symptoms, and it was confirmed that the test was positive, increasing the number of cases to 35. The female nurse was working at the women's orthopedic department at Al-Bashir Hospital. All her colleagues at the department, and people she came in contact with, including her family were tested and underwent the 14 day quarantine procedure. Five more cases were confirmed later that day, bringing the total of confirmed cases to 40.

On 18 March, at 01:00 am, the Spokesman for the Jordanian National Committee for Epidemics Natheer Obaidat announced that the total number of COVID-19 cases in Jordan has reached 48, including one recovery. He also mentioned that the 14 new cases reported on Tuesday, March 17, were the infected citizens who arrived from abroad and others that had direct contact with the infected. During the afternoon of 18 March, 4 cases were confirmed, bringing the total up to 52 cases. Around 8:00 pm on the same day, 4 more cases was confirmed (from those quarantined), bringing the total number of the cases to 56.

On the evening of 19 March, 13 additional cases were confirmed, from which 11 were those who mixed with the infected, and one was from the Irbid wedding, and the 13th case was a quarantined case, bringing the total number of the cases to 69. The nationality of the new cases were eight Jordanians, one Filipino, one Argentinian, two Iraqis, and one Lebanese. By now, there were 4,892 people quarantined, 1,837 in Dead Sea hotels, and 3,055 people in Amman hotels.

On 20 March, around 8:30 pm the Jordanian Government reported 15 additional cases, 3 of the cases were for 3 people from the same family whose sister was infected and came to Jordan from Norway, and 3 other cases were in close contact with people from the Irbid wedding, and 2 of the people that are quarantined in one of the hospitals, and 3 cases for people who were in close contact with an infected case, and 3 other cases were confirmed differently, and the last case have not been confirmed how he/she was infected, bringing the total of the cases to 84, including the only recovery case.

On 21 March, around 8:15 pm, the Jordanian Minister of Health announced 15 new cases in Jordan, including 5 from the Irbid wedding, 3 quarantined in the hotels, 2 Iraqis infected from their parents, 1 infected from a previously infected brother, 1 infection in a Jordanian university, 1 of unknown origin, 1 from foreign Medical Staff, bringing the total number of cases to 99, including one recovery.

==== 22–28 March ====
On 22 March, there were 13 additional cases confirmed, one of the cases was for a 19-year-old man who came from Britain, and 5 more cases from Irbid's wedding, and 6 cases for people who were in close contact with a nurse who was infected, including an 83-year-old woman who was in mild to moderate condition, and one of unknown origin, bringing the total of the cases to 112.

On 23 March, 15 additional cases of COVID-19 were reported in Jordan. Four of the cases were already in quarantine at Prince Hamzah Hospital, along with a female administrative staff member at the hospital. To date the 127 confirmed cases (126 active and 1 recovered) are the following nationalities: 103 Jordanians, 7 Iraqis, 6 French, 3 British, 3 Lebanese, 2 Filipinos, 1 Palestinian, 1 Argentinian, 1 Ugandan. Total quarantined 5050 persons, of which 3104 are in Amman, 1923 in the Dead Sea area, 23 in Aqaba, bringing the total number of cases in Jordan to 127.

On 24 March, 26 additional cases were reported, including 12 cases from the Irbid wedding, 5 more cases who were in close contact with one of their family who was infected by a nurse, 3 British individuals, one Spanish individual who was in Romania, 1 American individual, 4 people who were in close contact with an infected person, bringing the total number of the cases to 153, including one recovery.

On 25 March, 19 additional cases have been confirmed, including 1 Iraqi individual, 1 Jordanian individual who came from Switzerland, 8 cases for people who were in close contact with an infected person including 1 Sri Lankan Maid, 4 cases for people who were in close contact with an infected nurse, and 5 more cases from the Irbid wedding, bringing the total of confirmed cases to 172.

On 26 March, another case was declared recovered bringing the total recovered cases to two. The patient had tested negative 4 days ago and was confirmed clear today. Forty additional cases have been confirmed today, including 26 from the Irbid wedding, 2 Jordanian citizens who came from Switzerland, one Jordanian individual who came from the UK, 4 cases for people who were in close contact with infected people, 3 cases for people who were in close contact with a nurse, and one case for someone who was in Saudi Arabia before the Quarantine, 2 Iraqis one of them came from Britain before the Quarantine, and one individual of unknown infection origin, bringing the total number of confirmed cases to 212. As a result, the governorate of Irbid has been completely isolated from the rest of the Kingdom. Today 385 people were arrested for violating the curfew, and 430 vehicles seized.

On 27 March, 16 new recoveries were confirmed, bringing the total of recoveries to 18. Also, 23 additional cases were confirmed, including 2 cases who were in quarantine and came from the United States, 8 cases that were in close contact with people who are infected in a residential building in one of the regions in Amman, 1 individual who came from Pakistan l, 3 cases for people who were in close contact with an infected person who was in Saudi Arabia, 1 Lebanese individual, 1 case who was in close contact with an infected person, 5 more cases from irbid's wedding, 2 cases that have not been confirmed how they were infected yet, bringing the total of confirmed cases to 235, and the total of active cases to 217.

On 28 March, the first death resulting from COVID-19 was confirmed in the kingdom. An 83-year-old woman who was admitted to a private hospital with various illnesses along with blood poisoning was transported from a private hospital to Prince Hamzah Hospital upon discovery that she had contracted the disease. She died early this day. Later in the evening, the total confirmed cases rose to 246 after 11 new cases were confirmed. Of those 11, 5 cases came from Irbid, 1 individual who was in close contact with an infected person, 1 woman who was in close contact with her infected daughter that was visiting from Norway, 3 cases from those already quarantined in hotels (2 of which came from the UK and 1 came from Baghdad), and the final remaining case is of unknown origin/cause, investigations are still ongoing. The health Minister announced that there are 3 cases in serious conditions.

==== 29–31 March ====
On 29 March, 13 additional cases have been confirmed, including 1 individual that was in close contact with her infected brother that returned from Egypt, 5 cases from Irbid, 1 individual that was in close contact with people who are infected in a residential building in one of the regions in Amman, 1 individual that was in close contact with people from Irbid, 2 cases of girls that were already quarantined upon returning from the UK, 1 individual who was in France, 1 case was reported from the Jordanian Royal Medical Services, bringing the total of confirmed cases to 259. Another death has been confirmed on the same day for a 77-year-old man. Another confirmed death of a 64-year-old man was reported later this evening.

On 30 March, the 4th death was confirmed, an 81-year-old woman who died as a result of complications from the virus, which caused her severe pneumonia. Later that day 9 additional cases were confirmed, of which 5 cases of people who were in close contact with one of the recently deceased because of COVID-19, 2 cases from Irbid, 1 case was reported by the Jordanian Royal Medical Services, 1 case for a person who was already quarantined, bringing the total of the cases to 268 cases, the 5th death was reported on the same day, 8 new recoveries were reported consisting of 4 French Tourists, 1 Argentinian, 1 Iraqi woman and 2 Jordanians.

On 31 March, 6 additional cases have been confirmed, 4 cases for people who were in close contact with people from irbid, and 2 cases for people who were in close contact with someone who is infected, bringing the total of the cases to 274, 4 new recoveries was confirmed on the same day with a total of 30 recoveries in the whole kingdom.

=== April 2020 ===
==== 1–7 April ====
On 1 April, 4 new cases had been confirmed, of which 2 were already in quarantine (having arrived from Spain on 15 March), while the other 2 were in contact with infected people (1 in Jerash and 1 in Irbid).

On 2 April, 21 additional cases have been confirmed, including 7 cases for people of the same family that were in close contact with their son who visited Spain and lives in Ramtha, 5 cases for people of the same family that were in close contact with an infected person, 5 cases for people of the same family who were in close contact with their infected father, 2 cases for people who were in close contact with their infected father, 1 individual that was in a visit to UK that was in the isolated hotels and when he returned to the house after the end of the 2 week isolation he tested positive, 1 individual from irbid's wedding, bringing the total of the cases to 299, 9 recoveries was confirmed on the same day with a total of 45 recovery.

On 3 April, 11 new cases were confirmed, 6 of which were members of the same family who had interacted with their infected father, 1 case that had come in contact with an infected person in Amman (Hashmi Al-Shamali neighbourhood), 1 case for a lady who had contact with her infected nephews/nieces, 1 case that came in contact with an infected person arriving from the UK, 1 case that came in contact with an infected person in Irbid, and 1 case that interacted with an infected person at Prince Hamzah Hospital. On the brighter side 13 persons were declared recovered today (10 at Prince Hamzah Hospital, 3 in Irbid).

On 4 April, 13 additional cases have been confirmed, including 2 cases from irbid, 1 case that is in one of the hotels that was in a visit to the UK, 1 case for a person from the Royal Jordanian that works in cleaning the airplanes, 1 cases for a person who was in close contact with an infected person in ajloun, 5 cases for people of the same family that were in close contact with their infected father, 3 cases for people of the same family that were in close contact with their infected parents, bringing the total of the cases to 323, 16 new recoveries was confirmed on the same day with a total of 74 recovery.

On 5 April, 22 additional cases have been confirmed, including 1 case for a person who was in close contact with an infected person from Lebanon, 2 Iraqis that were in close contact with an infected person, 1 case for a person that was in close contact with his infected father, 1 case for a person that was in close contact with an infected person from Irbid, 1 case for a person that was in close contact with an infected person in a company, 1 case for a mother that was taking care of her son at Prince Hamzah Hospital, 1 case from one of the private hospitals in Amman, 7 cases for people who were in close contact with an infected person in one of the regions of Amman (Hashmi Al-Shamali neighbourhood), 7 cases of the same family that was infected by their father, bringing the total of the cases to 345, 36 recoveries were confirmed on the same day (29 in Irbid, 7 from Prince Hamzah Hospital including 2 French and an Iraqi) the total to 110 recoveries.

On 6 April, 4 additional cases have been confirmed, 1 case for a person who was in close contact with his infected wife who was in a visit to Italy, 1 case for a woman who had a close contact with her infected fiancé who was in close contact with an infected person from Lebanon, 1 case for a female who was in close contact with an infected person, 1 case for a person who was in close contact with an infected person, bringing the total of the cases to 349, 16 new recoveries was confirmed on the same day with a total of 126 recoveries in the whole kingdom. 1 new death was confirmed on the same day for a person who arrived dead to a private hospital in Amman and to confirm the reason of death he was tested for COVID-19 and the test was positive. Five contact tracer teams were dispatched and collected 81 samples from those who have interacted with the deceased including coworkers (at a hotel in Amman).

On 7 April, 4 additional cases have been confirmed, including 2 cases for people who were in close contact with infected people, 2 cases that are still looking for the reason of infection, bringing the total of the cases to 353, 12 new recoveries was confirmed on the same day with a total of 138 recovery in the whole kingdom.

==== 8–14 April ====
On 8 April, 5 additional cases have been confirmed, most of which were for people who were in close contact with infected people, bringing the total of the cases to 358, 12 new recoveries were confirmed on the same day with a total of 150 recoveries to date.

On 9 April, 14 additional case have been confirmed, including 2 cases for people who were in close contact with their infected father, 3 cases for people of the same family that were in close contact with their infected father, 1 case for a person who was in close contact with her daughter, 5 cases for people of the same family including an Ugandan that were infected by their infected son, 1 case for a person who came from Dubai and was quarantined in the royal Jordanian medical services, 2 cases with unknown reason, bringing the total of the cases to 372, 11 recoveries was confirmed on the same day with a total of 161 recovery, 1 new death was confirmed on the same day for a 69-year-old man.

On 10 April, no new cases have been confirmed, 9 new recoveries was confirmed on the same day (3 in Irbid and 6 in Prince Hamzah Hospital) with a total of 170 recovery.

On 11 April, 9 new cases were confirmed, 7 of which were within the same family of an infected individual, 1 additional case being a coworker of same individual, and the last case being a person in the quarantined area of Marqab. Additionally 7 recoveries were announced.

On 12 April, 8 additional cases was confirmed, including 3 cases from a residential building in a neighborhood in Amman (Hashmi Al Shamali), 1 cases for a person who was in close contact with his infected father and his own father, 3 cases of the random cases that was made for random people, bringing the total of the cases to 389, 24 new recoveries was confirmed on the same day with a total of 201.

On 13 April, 2 additional cases was confirmed, including 1 case for a person who was in close contact with her infected mother, 1 case for a person who was in close contact with an infected person of her relatives, bringing the total of the cases to 391, 14 new recoveries was confirmed on the same day with a total of 215 in the whole kingdom.

On 14 April, 6 additional cases was confirmed, including 2 cases for truck drivers, 1 case for a Sri Lankan that was in close contact with an infected person, 3 cases that was detected in the north of Amman who were in close contact with an infected person, bringing the total of the cases to 397, 20 new recoveries was confirmed on the same day, with a total of 235 recovery.

==== 15–21 April ====
On 15 April, 4 additional cases were confirmed, including 3 cases for people who were in close contact with an infected person in Irbid, 1 case for a person who was in close contact with an infected person in Prince Hamzah Hospital, bringing the total of the cases to 401, 15 new recoveries were confirmed on the same day, with a total of 250 recoveries.

On 16 April, 1 additional case was confirmed that day, bringing the total of the cases to 402, 9 new recoveries were confirmed with a total of 259 recovery.

On 17 April, 5 additional cases were confirmed, including 2 cases for people who were in close contact with their infected mother, 1 case for a truck driver, 1 case for a woman infected by her husband, and 1 cases that was not specified, bringing the total of the cases to 407, 6 new recoveries were confirmed on the same day with a total of 265 recovery in the whole kingdom.

On 18 April, 6 additional case were confirmed, including 4 cases that were detected on the borders for truck drivers (including 1 Egyptian and 1 Pakistani), 1 case that was found in the random tests that was made for random people in different places in the kingdom, 1 case for a two-and-a-half year-old girl that was in close contact with her infected parents, bringing the total of the cases to 413, 4 new recoveries were confirmed on the same day with a total of 269 recovery.

On 19 April, 4 additional case were confirmed, including 2 cases that were infected by their infected father, 2 cases for siblings that were infected by their sibling, bringing the total of the cases to 417, 7 new recoveries was confirmed on the same day with a total of 276 recovery in the whole kingdom.

On 20 April, 8 additional cases were confirmed, all of whom were truck drivers that tested positive upon entering land border crossings. Three were Jordanians and five were of foreign nationality, raising the total number of cases to 425. 6 new recoveries were confirmed on the same day with a total of 282 recovery in the whole kingdom.

On 21 April, 3 additional cases were confirmed, all of whom were truck drivers who tested positive upon entering land border crossing, bringing the total of the cases to 428. 15 new recoveries were confirmed on the same day with a total of 297 recovery in the whole kingdom.

==== 22–28 April ====
On 22 April, 7 additional cases were confirmed, including 3 cases for truck drivers, 2 cases for people that were in close contact with their infected father, 1 case for a person who was in close contact with an infected person who is in Prince Hamza Hospital, 1 case that was tested positive in a private lab and with unknown reason, bringing the total of the cases to 435, 18 new recoveries was confirmed on the same day with a total of 315 recoveries.

On 23 April, 2 new cases were confirmed, the first case was for a truck driver that was tested upon entering the country, the second case was for an individual who flew in from the UK on 15 March and was quarantined for 20 days at one of the hotels and released after testing negative; he was later tested after symptoms appeared roughly five weeks after entering the country, bringing the total of the cases to 437, 3 Additional recoveries were announced today with a total of 318 recoveries, A new daily record of 3200 COVID-19 tests was performed today.

On 24 April, 4 additional cases were confirmed, 2 of whom were truck drivers, 2 other cases for people who were in close contact with an infected person who is a truck driver, bringing the total of the cases to 441, 8 new recoveries were confirmed that day with a total of 326 recoveries.

On 25 April, 3 additional cases were confirmed, all of whom were for truck drivers that were tested positive on the land borders, bringing the total of the cases to 444, 6 new recoveries were confirmed on the same day with a total of 332 recoveries.

On 26 April, 3 additional cases were confirmed, 2 of whom were for truck drivers, 1 case for a 5-year-old girl who was in close contact with her infected parents, bringing the total of the cases to 447, 5 new recoveries were confirmed that day with a total of 337 recoveries.

On 27 April, 2 new cases were confirmed, one for a truck driver entering at Al-Omari border crossing, and one for a child visiting his infected mother at Prince Hamzah hospital, 5 new recoveries were confirmed with a total of 342 recoveries, Over 2800 people were tested today.

On 28 April, no additional cases were confirmed, 6 new recoveries were confirmed that day with a total of 348 recoveries, 1 new death was confirmed on the same day.

==== 29–30 April ====
On 29 April, 2 additional cases were confirmed, all of whom were for truck drivers that were tested positive in the land borders, bringing the total of the cases to 451, 8 new recoveries were confirmed that day with a total of 356 recoveries.

On 30 April, 2 additional cases were confirmed, all of whom were for truck drivers that were tested positive in the land borders, bringing the total of the cases to 453, 6 new recoveries were confirmed on the same day with a total number of 362 recoveries.

=== May 2020 ===
==== 1–7 May ====
On 1 May, 6 additional cases were confirmed, all of who were for truck drivers that were tested positive in the land borders, bringing the total of the cases to 459, 2 new recoveries were confirmed on the same day with a total number of 364 recoveries.

On 2 May, 1 additional case was confirmed, the confirmed case was for a truck driver that tested positive in the land borders, bringing the total number of the cases to 460, 3 new recoveries were confirmed with a total number of 367 recoveries, the 9th death was confirmed for a 73-year-old man who had chronic diseases.

On 3 May, 1 additional case was confirmed for a truck driver who tested positive in the land borders, bringing the total number of cases to 461, no new recoveries was confirmed, for the 6th day in a row no additional cases was confirmed inside the country, and the number of the cases that are receiving treatment in the Jordanian hospitals reached 64 cases.

On 7 May, 21 new cases were confirmed. These cases were the result of an infected truck driver that did not adhere to the self quarantine procedures upon entering the country. According to the investigations by trace teams, the individual had invited a number of people to Iftar at his residence, several of whom have tested positive. A nurse at the Northern Badia Hospital was among those infected by the driver and 65 of the hospitals personnel are being tested.

==== 8–14 May ====
On 8 May, 8 new cases were confirmed until noon. These are also linked to the recent discovery of an infected driver a couple of days ago in Mafraq. 4 of these cases have been reported in Ramtha

=== August ===
By late August, restrictions were slowly eased. Authorities permitted public gatherings of up to 20 people, movement between governorates, and the reopening of the tourism industry. Hotels, restaurants, bars, gyms, and nurseries were allowed to reopen at a limited capacity. Furthermore, houses of worship were also reopened. Public transportation would be operational at 50 percent capacity. However, social distancing measures were to continue to be enforced, with individuals being compelled to wear protective gloves and masks in public spaces or receive a fine.

=== September ===
Aviation authorities announce a plan to reopen Amman Airport to commercial flights from September 8.

=== October ===
There was a sharp uptake in COVID-19 outbreaks in October 2020. On October 6, 2020, the Jordanian government declared a nationwide curfew on Fridays and Saturdays.

=== November ===
In November, Jordan became the Arab country with the highest number of COVID-19-related deaths per capita. Despite this, a parliamentary election was held in person.

== Statistics ==
=== Number of cases and deaths on a logarithmic scale ===
Number of cases (blue) and deaths (red) on a logarithmic scale.

=== Charts ===
==== New cases ====
View source data.

==== New deaths ====
View source data.

== Quarantine and isolation ==
During the first weeks of the spread of the coronavirus in Jordan (March 2020), the Jordanian authorities declared that all whom are required for "isolation", will be quarantined in five-star hotels across the country, with the central government covering the costs. On March 18, the Jordanian Minister of Tourism and Antiquities, Majd Shawaika said that 1,900 people who came into the country during the last week have been placed in the Dead Sea resorts, while 3,000 were placed in Amman resorts and hotels. After visiting the location, Shawaika confirmed that the tourism company Jett has been securing the services to quarantine civilians. The minister also confirmed that there are 11,000 vacant suits ready to welcome any more quarantined individuals.

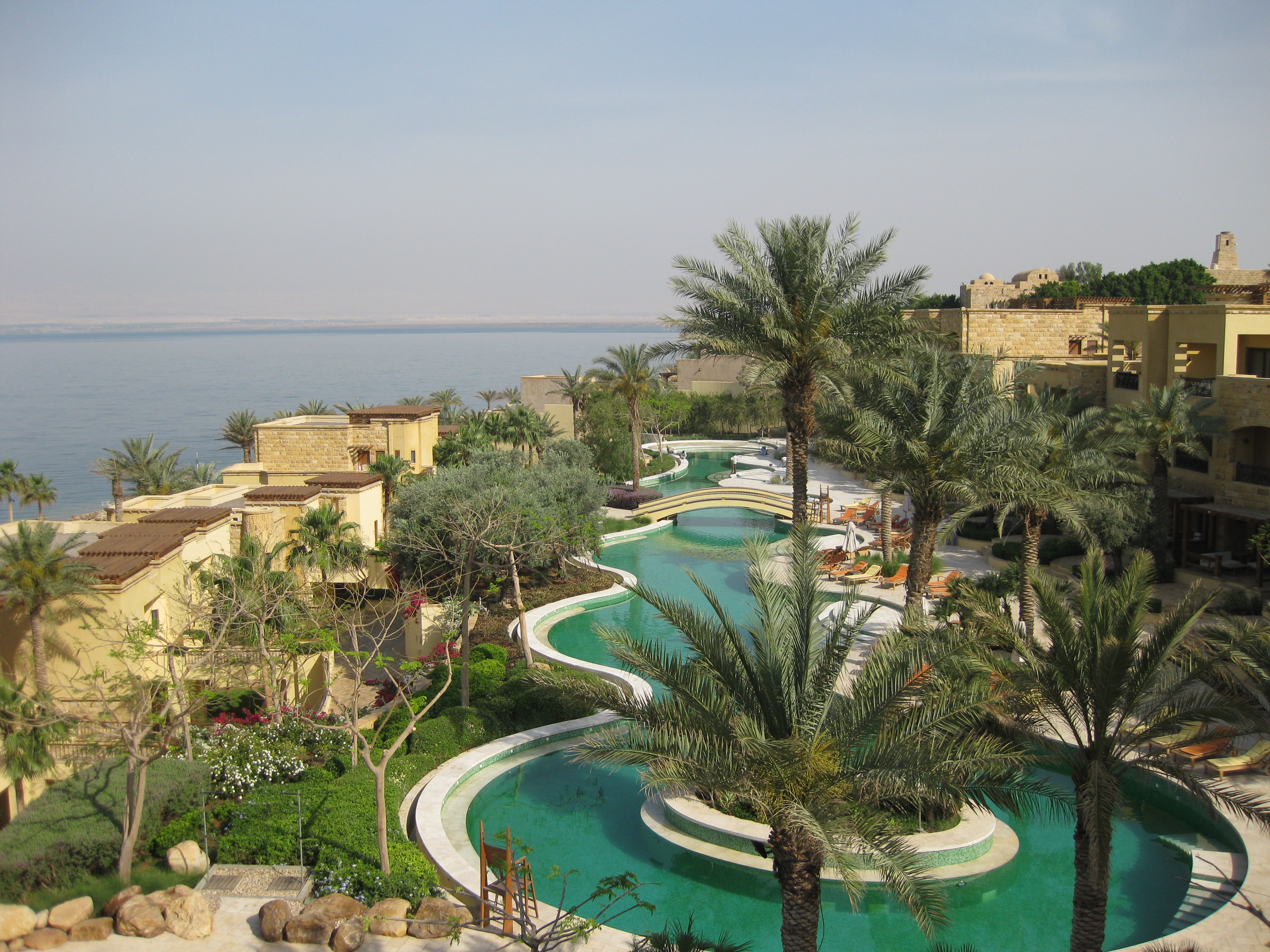
Dead Sea Resorts used by Jordanian authorities to quarantine individuals suspected of being infected with COVID-19

The minister confirmed that all necessary measures have been taken in the hotels and resorts, such as necessary sanitation operations, and banning outside visits.

As of 24 March, the number of quarantined individuals is 5050 persons, most of whom are located in hotels that have been rented out by the government and converted into quarantine facilities. The majority of these people have been placed in quarantine upon arrival to Jordan from abroad to wait out the virus's incubation period. The total number of rented hotels on March 24 has reached 34 hotels (23 in Amman, 10 at the Dead Sea area, 1 in Aqaba).

As of 19 August, quarantine in government sponsored facilities is 14 days followed by 7–24 days of home quarantine. Based on uncertain scientific data, diplomats are only required to quarantine at home for 7 days.

== Prevention ==
On 27 February, Jordan temporarily banned people entering from China, South Korea, and Iran. The kingdom has been screening everyone who enters Jordanian border crossings and airports, with mandatory chest and throat examinations as well as temperature checks. Jordanians who test positive will be quarantined for 2 weeks.

=== State of emergency ===
The Jordanian government declared a state of emergency on 19 March and imposed a curfew on 21 March. There were long lines at bakeries and groceries before curfew took effect.

== Antivirals ==
The Jordanian government has authorized the use of hydroxychloroquine as an antiviral treatment for patients with advanced illness.

== Government response ==
Ministry of Health dedicated website for the COVID-19 pandemic in Jordan.

Ministry of Health COVID-19 hotline: 111

Portal for all government platforms related to dealing with COVID-19: واحد

=== March 2020 ===
On 6 March, the Jordanian government made an agreement with Facebook to launch an awareness campaign regarding COVID-19. Facebook will present all site visitors from within the Kingdom with links to the Ministry of Health website promoting its content intended to increase awareness of the outbreak, preventative measures and tips to reduce the spread, and the dedicated facilities for testing and treatment.

On 10 March, the following measures were announced:

1. Halt on travel to/from Lebanon.
2. Halt all travel to/from Syria except for trucks.
3. Closing of Sheikh Hussein (Northern) crossing with Israel, King Hussein/Allenby Bridge with the West Bank, Wadi Araba (Southern) crossing with Israel for all passengers except official delegations, cargo personnel and Jordanian workers using the Wadi Araba crossing.
4. Prevention of arrivals from France, Spain and Germany starting 16 March 2020, and prevention of Jordanians from travelling to those countries.
5. Closing of sea crossings with Egypt, and reducing planes incoming from Egypt by 50% and allowing only urgent travel to Egypt while maintaining trade operations as normal.
6. Halting passenger movement through Al-Karameh border crossing with Iraq, except for official delegations, while maintaining commercial movement. Baghdad airport and Erbil airports are to be the only points of entry to/from Iraq for passengers.
7. Jordanians returning from all the above will be allowed entry conditional to a self imposed quarantine at home for 14 days.
8. Exempt from the above are diplomatic missions / international organizations, foreign investors residing in Jordan conditional to being subjected to the precautionary measures imposed by the Ministry of Health.
9. Cancellation of all international and local conferences except those explicitly allowed by the cabinet

On 11 March, the following measures were announced:

- Preventing non-Jordanians from entering the Kingdom from the following countries: China, South Korea, Iran, Italy. Jordanians from the aforementioned will be quarantined on arrival.
- Banning vacations for expatriates working in Jordan.
- Halting new work permits for workers from abroad.
- Banning vacations for foreign students studying in Jordan wishing to travel to countries where the disease has spread.
- Banning school trips to foreign countries.
- Suspending of public servants travel to foreign countries except for in extremely urgent cases and only when approved by the cabinet.
- Suspending all tourist travel between Jordan and Palestine/Israel.
- Advising citizens against travel except in extremely urgent cases.
- Directing citizens arriving from countries with large numbers of COVID-19 cases (such as Iraq, Egypt, France, Spain, Germany) to self-quarantine at home for two weeks and alerting health authorities in case of any signs/symptoms of infection.

On 14 March, Prime Minister Omar Razzaz announced the following measures and directives that the government has undertaken to deal with the COVID-19 virus and in light of the accelerating international developments:

1. Educational Sector
  - Halting all educational institutions operations starting the morning of March 15 for the duration of two weeks.
  - Ministry of Education to coordinate administrative staff work/shifts.
  - The Ministry of Education will commence with the Distant/Remote Learning Plan through the ministry's e-site starting next week, and through television stations this week.
2. Travel Arrangements
  - In addition to previous announcements of halting air travel from certain countries effective 16 March, all air travel from/to the Kingdom will be halted effective Tuesday 17 March 2020 until further notice, except for commercial cargo.
  - Exempt from travel restrictions are diplomatic missions, international organizations provided they adhere to the Ministry of Health's directives including a self imposed 14 day quarantine, and immediate notification in case of any signs/symptoms of health authorities.
  - All land/sea border crossings will be shut to passenger movement and only commercial cargo be allowed.
  - Advising Jordanians currently abroad to remain at their current locations.
  - Jordanians in neighboring countries and urgently need to return home will be allowed entry through land/sea crossings subject to MoH procedures.
3. Public events, Religious events, Tourism
  - Halting all public events and gatherings and advising citizens from congregating at social events (weddings, funerals)
  - Stressing on citizens the adherence to remain at home as much as possible and leave only if necessary.
  - Under the advice of the Fatwa Council and Council of Churches, halting prayer in all the Kingdom's mosques and churches as a preventative measure
  - Halting of hospital and prison visits starting Sunday 15 March and until further notice.
  - Closing of all historic tourist sites for one week in order to execute disinfection campaigns at these site
  - Halting all sports events, closing of all cinemas, swimming facilities, sports clubs and youth centers until further notice.
  - Banning argeeleh (hookah) and smoking in coffee shops and restaurants. Violations will result in the closure.
  - Restaurants and coffee shops are to adhere to MoH guidelines for distancing of seating.
4. Public and Private Sectors
  - Ministries, government departments, public/official establishments will remain open
  - The government will cooperate with the chambers of industry and commerce in setting procedures for protecting private sector employees
5. Procedures for crises management
  - The crisis cell will work around the clock to followup on the developments relating to COVID-19, the following tasks force will be established:
    - Medical care task force
    - Border control, crossings and airport task force
    - Social protection task force
    - Strategic reserve task force (Food and drugs)
    - Media followup task force

On 17 March, the Jordanian government announced several of Precautionary measures which are :

1. Disrupting all institutions and official departments, with the exception of vital sectors determined by the Prime Minister, based on the recommendation of the concerned minister, according to the Minister of State for Information Affairs Amjad Al-Adayleh.
2. Minister Al-Adayleh added, during a press briefing, that the Cabinet affirmed that the Jordanian people must not leave the house except in the most urgent cases.
3. The government decided to disable the private sector, except for the entire health sector, and vital sectors to be determined by the Prime Minister based on the recommendations of the Minister of Industry, Trade and Supply, and to follow the decisions of the Ministry of Labor regarding personnel affairs.
4. The government prevented the gathering of more than 10 people, and prevented movement between the governorates, according to Al-Adayleh. He added, The suspension of operations and medical reviews is limited to emergency situations and emergency operations.
5. It also decided to stop the printing of paper newspapers, as they contribute to the transmission of infection, to suspend the work of mass transportation, and to keep the work of pharmacies, catering centers, bakeries, and food, drug, water, fuel and electricity supply chains.
6. And also it was decided to close the malls and commercial centers and allow only the opening of supply centers and pharmacies in them.
7. The government decided to set up quarantine camps for the people who come from the land border crossing.

A Royal Decree has been issued the same day, approving the cabinet's decision to announce the implementation of the National Defence Law No. 13 of 1992 in the Kingdom, as of Wednesday, 17 March 2020.

Article 2 of the Defense Law explains its objectives. It stipulates that, "upon a decision and a Royal Decree, a National Defence Law shall be passed in case of emergency that would threaten the national security or public safety in all parts of the Kingdom or in a region due to war, disturbances, armed internal strife, public disasters or the spread of a pest or epidemic."

However, the third Article of the Law states:

- The application of this law shall be entrusted to the Prime Minister to take the necessary measures and procedures so as to ensure public safety and defend the Kingdom without being bound by the provisions of the regular laws in force.
- The Prime Minister exercises his powers according to written orders.
- The Prime Minister may delegate all or some of his powers to whomever he deems fit to do so throughout the Kingdom or in a specific region thereof, subject to the conditions and restrictions that he appoints.

The fourth Article of the Law states the powers of the Prime Minister under this law. The PM may exercise the following powers:

- Placing restrictions on the freedom of people to gather, move, reside, and arrest or detain suspects or those who pose a threat to the national security and public order.
- Assigning any person to perform any work or service within their ability.
- Checking persons, places, and vehicles without being bound by the provisions of any other law, and ordering the use of appropriate force in the event of opposition.
- Setting possession of movable and immovable property and postponing debt payment and the accrued liability.
- Preventing or restricting the importation, exportation or transfer of goods from one place to another and prohibiting their concealment, destruction, purchase or bartering them, and setting their prices.
- Seizing any land, building, road, or source of water and energy, removing any trees or installations on them, establishing facilities for defense purposes instead and ordering the concerned parties to manage, exploit and organize their use.
- Evacuating or isolating some areas and imposing curfew on them.
- Ordering some or all public stores to open and close at specific times.
- Regulating and specifying transportation between different regions, blocking any road or water stream or changing its direction and preventing traffic or regulating it.
- Monitoring messages, newspapers, publications, pamphlets, drawings, and all means of expression, publicity and advertisement before they are published and seizing, confiscating, suspending, and closing the places where they were prepared.
- Preventing taking pictures or making designs or maps for any specific place or thing that might benefit the enemy, preventing having any photographic equipment or materials for making photos, designs and maps in such places and preventing staying for so long in those places without a legitimate excuse.
- Cancelling licenses of firearms, ammunition, explosives, or explosive materials that are used in the manufacture of explosives, preventing their manufacture, sale, purchase, transfer, disposing them, ordering their delivery and seizure, and closing the shops where they are sold or stored.
- Preventing the manufacture, sale, purchase or possession of telecommunications equipment and ordering their delivery and seizure.

On 18 March The Ministry of Tourism and Antiquities dedicates a round-the-clock toll free hotline number 91040 for enquirers and complaints of those under quarantine.

On 20 March, The government has decided to impose a curfew in Jordan, as part of its measures to fight coronavirus.

Citizens will be officially banned from moving in all regions of the Kingdom, from 7:00 am tomorrow, until further notice.

As he announced Defense Order No.2 during a press briefing today, Minister of State for Media Affairs Amjad Adaileh pointed out that all the stores in all regions of the Kingdom will be closed.

On 22 March, the government allowed Gas and Water deliveries.

- Minister of Digital Commerce and Entrepreneurship Mothanna Gharaibeh announces distant learning platform. 70,000 students have started using this platform since this morning. The platform was developed in less than a week, to allow students to study from home. Telecommunication companies agreed to provide free access to the platform daily from 6:00 am to 4:00 pm, the government, in turn, allowed access to an expanded range of frequencies to allow for the expansion of the services and provide additional needed bandwidth.
- Minister of Education Dr. Tayseer Al No'aimi announces the launch of the e-learning platform starting 7:00 this morning until 16:00 for grades-12. The launch of the platform in response to His Majesty's directives and the prime minister's continued follow-up to ensure the right to education for all students. The e-learning platform supplements the newly launched TV stations "Jo Darsak 1" and "Jo Darsak 2" designated for students of all grades.

On 23 March, the government allowed doorstep deliveries of water, bread, and baby formula.

However, the government will announce on Tuesday, 24 March, specific times for people to get their needs within a mechanism that will be announced at that time.

"Anyone who violates the provisions of this Order and the measures issued by the Prime Minister and the Minister of Defence shall be liable to immediate imprisonment for a period not exceeding one year," Adaileh confirmed.

As for emergency medical cases, citizens must inform the Public Security Directorate (PSD) or the Civil Defense Directorate (CDD) to take the necessary measures to protect their health and safety according to the rules.

People authorized by the Prime Minister and the Minister of Defense, based on their work nature, are excluded from the decision.

On 24 March, Prime Minister Omar Razzaz announced that small neighborhood grocery and convenience stores along with pharmacies, drinking-water stores and bakeries, will be allowed to open from 10:00 to 18:00 starting Wednesday 25 of March. Citizens between the ages of 16-60 will be allowed to visit their neighborhood stores on foot only to get basic supplies; vehicles are still not permitted. Persons are to travel individually and maintain a distance of no less than 1.5 meters between one another at all times. Larger supermarkets are planned to be allowed to sell and deliver items to citizens homes starting Thursday 26 March. This comes after the partially successful attempt to distribute bread to citizens directly to prevent them leaving their homes.

On 25 March, The Ministry of Health receives 21,000 additional test kits and expands testing efforts. The MoH reaffirms that it is ready to test any suspected cases and urges citizens to contact the hotline 111 for all queries regarding "Corona".

On 26 March, The Prime Minister announces Defense Order #3 for the year 2020:

1. Disobeying Order #2 of Defense Law for 2020 will result in the following punishments:
  1. A fine between 100 and 500 JDs for the first offence.
  2. Imprisonment for no more than one year and/or a fine of 100-500 JDs for the second offence
  3. Any vehicle used without a permit will be impounded for 30 days.
2. Any permitted store that opens outside of designated times will be fined no less than 1000 JDs or the closure of the store for 14 days.
3. Any store that opens without permission to open will be closed for 3 months and/or fined 3000 JDs.

On 30 March, The government started releasing Jordanians held in 14-day mandatory quarantine (inbound travelers). All individuals will sign/commit to self quarantine for the next 14 days. The government will undertake the transport of all individuals without cost to minimize interaction, mixing and exposure en route to their residences. 3337 persons of a total of 3679 were released. 2026 were held in hotels in Amman, 1311 in the Dead Sea region, and 16 in Aqaba.

On 31 March, The government started releasing non-Jordanians held in 14-day mandatory quarantine back to their residences. 1148 persons of 67 nationalities will be returned home after signing a commitment to another 14 days of self isolation at home. The government will also undertake the transport of these individuals as with Jordanians without cost to minimize interaction, mixing and exposure en route to their residences. The government also announced Defence Order #4 for the year 2020.

=== April 2020 ===
On 6 April, the government launched a website for citizens to request permits to leave their homes for urgent matters at تصريح الخروج من المنزل Currently the reasons permitted are:

1. Going to the bank for company payroll purposes
2. Going to the hospital
3. Death cases

On 19 April, all restaurants were re-opened in Aqaba.

=== May 2020 ===
On 3 May, the prime minister issued Defense Order #11 pertaining to the use of protective equipment by people. In summary individuals in public places will be expected to wear a protective mask and gloves, failure to do so will result in a fine of between 20 and 50 Jordanian Dinars. Those who work at facilities that serve the public (whether government or private), will also have to adhere to wearing safety equipment and are subjected to heftier fines ranging from 100 to 200 Jordanian Dinars per infraction along with the closing of the facility for 14 days.

On 5 May, Phase 1 Jordanian students being evacuated back home will start and commence until 8 May. 3239 students are expected to be returned home and placed in quarantine.

=== March 2021 ===
On 9 March, Jordan registered 7072 new COVID-19 cases and 59 deaths. The Jordanian authorities announced the closure of schools until further notice, noting that it had been only one month since they opened.

On 13 March, seven COVID-19 patients died at a hospital in Al-Salt, due to shortage of oxygen supplies. The Minister of Health, Nazir Obeidat, was fired following the incident.

On 25 March, Jordan said that it was planning to create a "coronavirus-free zone" for tourists where only vaccinated people can have access. The zone includes Wadi Rum, Petra and the Dead Sea.

== Protests against Covid-19 measures ==
On March 15, 2021, protests erupted across many of Jordan's cities and provincial towns against the Jordanian government's COVID-19 restrictions, a day after oxygen ran out at a state hospital leading to the deaths of at least six COVID-19 patients. Hundreds of people gathered in the streets in defiance of a night curfew in the city of Irbid and several other provincial cities including a neighbourhood in the capital Amman and the city of Salt. Protesters also gathered further south in Karak city and the port city of Aqaba.

On March 25, 2021, Jordanian riot police dispersed protests in Amman and other cities called to mark the 10th anniversary of Arab Spring pro-democracy demonstrations, and detained tens of activists. Protesters demanded democracy and an end to emergency laws introduced with the COVID-19 pandemic in 2020, which civic groups say violate civil and political rights.

== COVID-19 vaccination programme in Jordan ==
At a press briefing on 14 December 2020, Jordan's Health Minister Nathir Obeidat announced the signing a final agreement to receive the Pfizer coronavirus vaccine to cover 5% of the population. Obeidat said the vaccine was expected to be delivered by February 2021.

On 14 January 2021, the UNHCR reported that Jordan was one of the first countries to offer COVID-19 vaccinations to refugees.

As of February 2021, the Jordan Food and Drug Administration (JFDA) approved three COVID-19 vaccines: the AstraZeneca vaccine for emergency use, the Pfizer-BioNTech, and the Sinopharm vaccines.

There is a portal for vaccination sign-up, set up by the Ministry of Health. The Ministry of Health and National Centre for Security and Crises Management is leading the vaccination efforts. To date, 29 main vaccination centres and 45 secondary centres are operating across the Kingdom to provide the vaccine.

Until 28 March 2021, Jordan vaccinated 274,360 people against COVID-19, noting that more than 822,140 people registered on the website.

In December 2021, 40% of the population of Jordan was fully vaccinated against the coronavirus.
