= Rantiya =

Rantiya رنتيّة Rantieh, Rantia, Rentie
- Former village
- Etymology: Rantieh, from a personal name
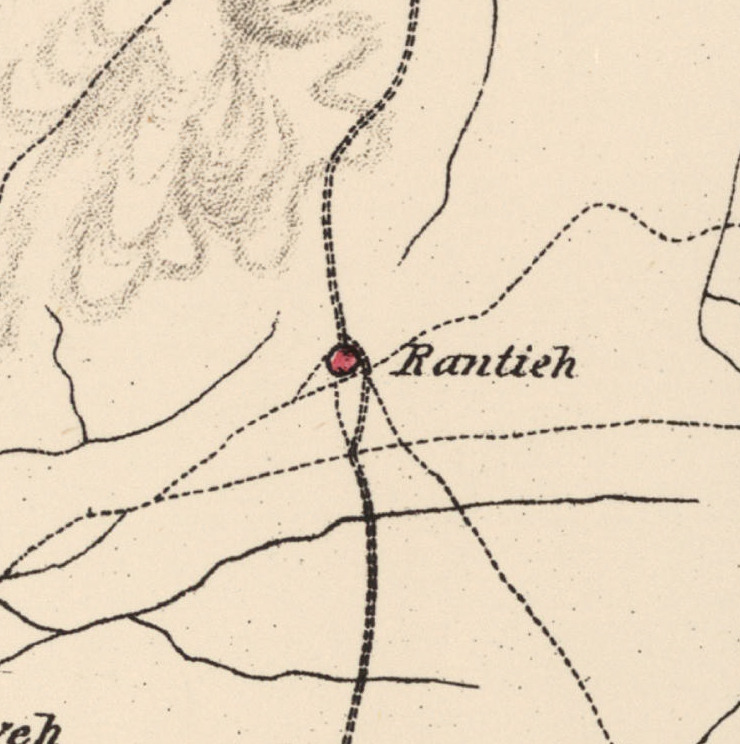
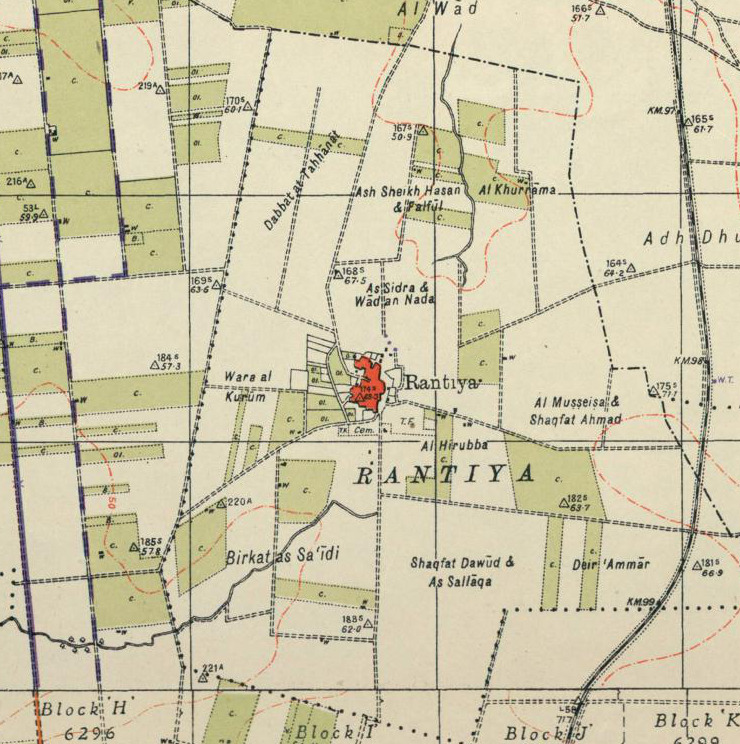
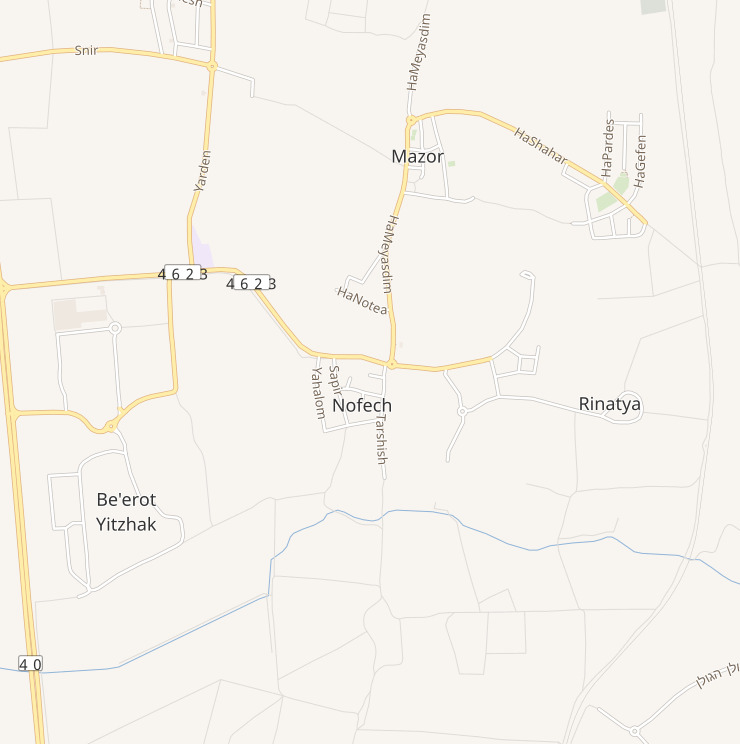
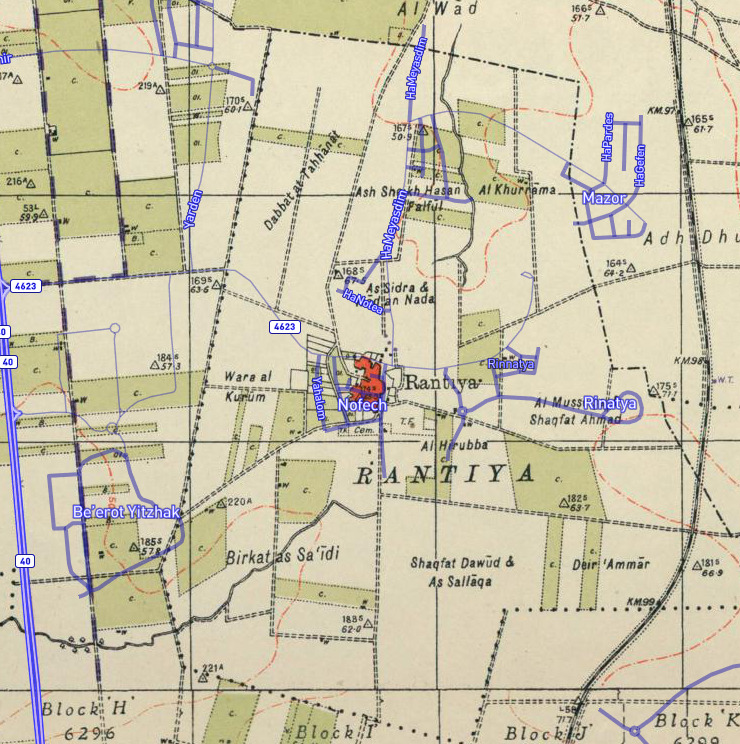
- 1870s map 1940s map modern map 1940s with modern overlay map A series of historical maps of the area around Rantiya (click the buttons)

- Location within Mandatory Palestine
- Coordinates: 32°2′40″N 34°55′17″E
- Palestine grid: 142/161
- Geopolitical entity: Mandatory Palestine
- Subdistrict: Jaffa
- Date of depopulation: 10 July 1948

Area
  - Total: 4,389 dunams (4.389 km^{2}; 1.695 sq mi)

Population (1945)
  - Total: 590
- Cause(s) of depopulation: Military assault by Yishuv forces
- Current Localities: Mazor, Nofekh, Rinatia

Rantiya (Arabic: رنتيّة, known to the Romans as Rantia and to the Crusaders as Rentie) was a Palestinian village, located 16 km (9.9 mi) east of Jaffa. During the British Mandate in Palestine, in 1945 it had a population of 590 inhabitants.

Those inhabitants became refugees after a 10 July 1948 assault by Israeli forces from the Palmach's Eighth Armored Brigade and the Third Infantry Battalion of the Alexandroni Brigade during the 1948 Arab-Israeli war.

Of the over 100 houses that made up the village, only three remain standing today. The Jewish localities of Mazor, Nofekh, and Rinatia are located on Rantiya's former lands.

== Etymology ==
Ranṭyā /Ranṭya/ is an ancient name which perfectly matches the Greek Ῥαντία. The name is apparently related to that of Ranṭīs which is a Grecized form of a Hebrew name (Rmtym, LXX Aρμαθαιμ); with t > ṭ under the influence of r.

During the Crusader era the village was known as Rentie, Rantia, or Rentia.

== History ==
The village was situated on a low mound on an ancient site.

In 1122 the tithes of the village were granted to the hospital of the church of St John at Nablus. In 1166, the tithes were granted to the Knights Hospitaller. A vaulted building in the village, named al-Baubariya, has been dated to the Crusader period.

=== Ottoman era ===
Rantiya, like the rest of Palestine, was incorporated into the Ottoman Empire in 1517, and in 1557 the revenues of the village were designated for the new waqf of Hasseki Sultan Imaret in Jerusalem, established by Hasseki Hurrem Sultan (Roxelana), wife of Suleiman the Magnificent. Administratively, the village belonged to the Sub-district of Ramla in the District of Gaza. In the late 1550s, local disturbances decreased the income from the village by nearly 40%.

In 1596, Rantiya was a village in the nahiya ("subdistrict") of Ramla ( liwa' ("district") of Gaza), with a population of 132. Villagers paid taxes to the authorities for the crops that they cultivated, which included wheat, barley, fruit, and sesame as well as on other types of property, such as goats and beehives. All the villagers were Muslim. All of the revenues; a total of 5,300 Akçe, went to a Waqf.

In 1838 it was noted as a Muslim village called Rentieh in the Lydda administrative region, while in 1856 the village was named Renthieh on Kiepert's map of Palestine published that year.

In 1870 the French explorer Victor Guérin visited and described the village as partially destroyed, while an Ottoman village list from about the same year showed that Rantiya had 33 houses and a population of 116, though the population count included men only.

In 1882, the PEF's Survey of Western Palestine found Rantiya to be a small village built of adobe bricks. At that time a main road passed right next to it.

=== British Mandate era ===
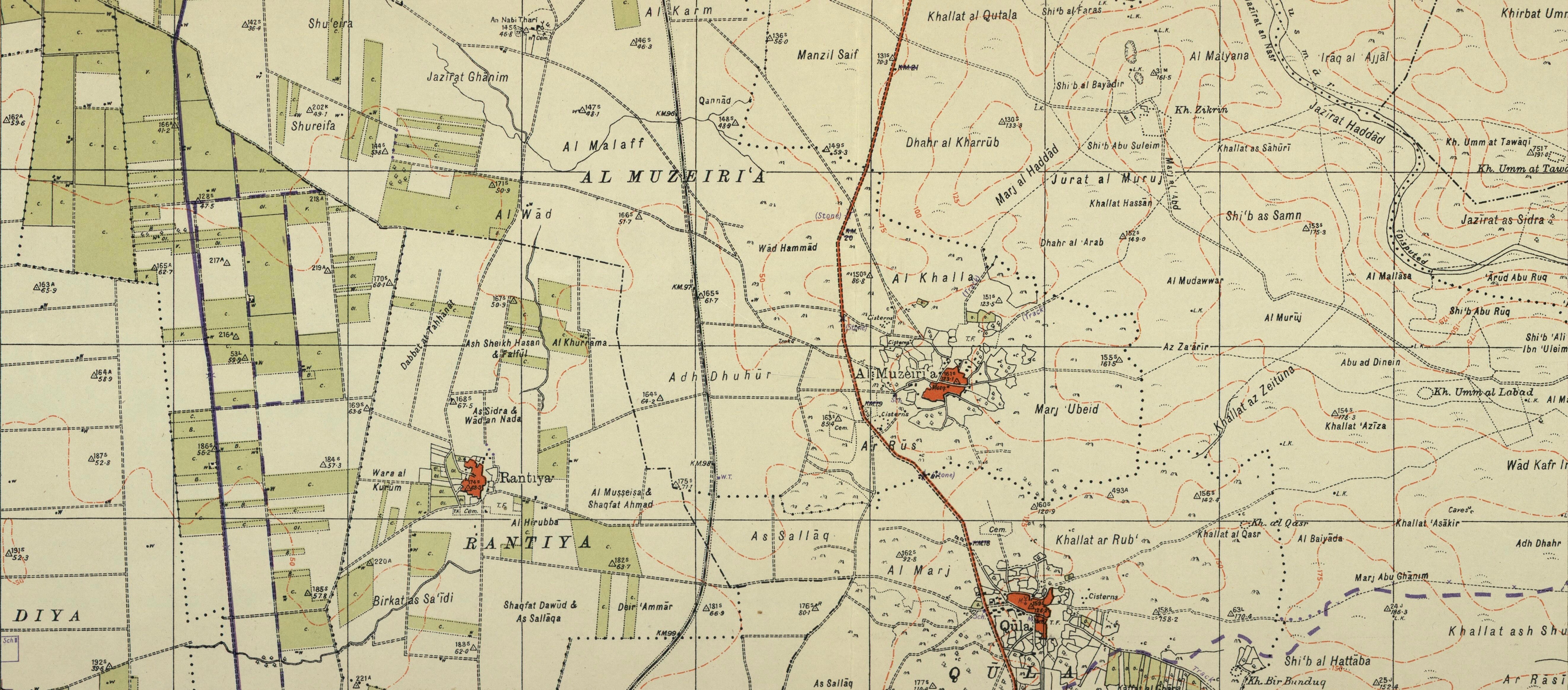
Rantiya 1941 1:20,000

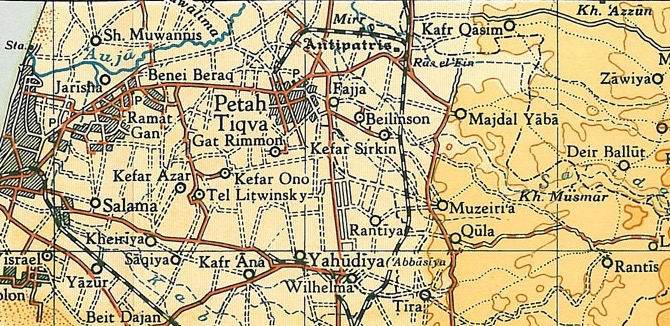
Rantiya 1945 1:250,000

In the 1922 census of Palestine conducted by the British Mandate authorities, Rantieh had a population of 351, all Muslims. increasing the 1931 census to 411, still all Muslims, in a total of 105 houses.

By 1945 the population had increased to 590 Muslims, while the total land area was 4,389 dunams, according to an official land and population survey. Of this, 505 were allocated for citrus and bananas, 99 were for plantations and irrigable land, 3,518 for cereals, while 13 dunams were classified as built-up areas.

=== 1948, and after ===
In 1992 the village remains were described as "Three deserted houses, standing amid weeds, tall wild grasses, and the debris of several other houses, are all that remains of the village. Two of the deserted houses are made of stone, the third of concrete. All have rectangular doors and windows. Two of them have flat roofs; the third may have had a gabled roof."

==== References in contemporary culture ====
In the film Soraida: A Woman of Palestine, by Tahani Rached, the main character explains that she named her daughter and son, Rantia and Aram, after Palestinian villages to preserve the memory of the homeland.

== See also ==
- List of villages depopulated during the Arab-Israeli conflict

== Bibliography ==
- Barron, J.B., ed. (1923). Palestine: Report and General Abstracts of the Census of 1922. Government of Palestine.
- Conder, C.R.; Kitchener, H.H. (1882). The Survey of Western Palestine: Memoirs of the Topography, Orography, Hydrography, and Archaeology. Vol. 2. London: Committee of the Palestine Exploration Fund.
- Dauphin, C. (1998). La Palestine byzantine, Peuplement et Populations. BAR International Series 726 (in French). Vol. III : Catalogue. Oxford: Archeopress. ISBN 978-0-860549-05-5.
- Department of Statistics (1945). Village Statistics, April, 1945. Government of Palestine.
- Guérin, V. (1875). Description Géographique Historique et Archéologique de la Palestine (in French). Vol. 2: Samarie, pt. 2. Paris: L'Imprimerie Nationale.
- Hadawi, S. (1970). Village Statistics of 1945: A Classification of Land and Area ownership in Palestine. Palestine Liberation Organization Research Center.
- Hartmann, M. (1883). "Die Ortschaftenliste des Liwa Jerusalem in dem türkischen Staatskalender für Syrien auf das Jahr 1288 der Flucht (1871)". Zeitschrift des Deutschen Palästina-Vereins. 6: 102–149.
- Hütteroth, W.-D.; Abdulfattah, K. (1977). Historical Geography of Palestine, Transjordan and Southern Syria in the Late 16th Century. Erlanger Geographische Arbeiten, Sonderband 5. Erlangen, Germany: Vorstand der Fränkischen Geographischen Gesellschaft. ISBN 978-3-920405-41-4.
- Khalidi, W. (1992). All That Remains: The Palestinian Villages Occupied and Depopulated by Israel in 1948. Washington D.C.: Institute for Palestine Studies. ISBN 978-0-88728-224-9.
- Mills, E., ed. (1932). Census of Palestine 1931. Population of Villages, Towns and Administrative Areas. Jerusalem: Government of Palestine.
- Morris, B. (2004). The Birth of the Palestinian Refugee Problem Revisited. Cambridge University Press. ISBN 978-0-521-00967-6.
- Palmer, E.H. (1881). The Survey of Western Palestine: Arabic and English Name Lists Collected During the Survey by Lieutenants Conder and Kitchener, R. E. Transliterated and Explained by E.H. Palmer. Committee of the Palestine Exploration Fund.
- Pringle, D. (1997). Secular buildings in the Crusader Kingdom of Jerusalem: an archaeological Gazetter. Cambridge University Press. ISBN 9780521460101.
- Pringle, D. (1998). The Churches of the Crusader Kingdom of Jerusalem: L-Z (excluding Tyre). Vol. II. Cambridge University Press. ISBN 0-521-39037-0.
- Prutz, H. (1881). "Die Besitzungen des Johanniterordens in Palestna und Syrien". Zeitschrift des Deutschen Palästina-Vereins. 4: 157–193.
- Rey, E.G. (1883). Les colonies franques de Syrie aux XIIme et XIIIme siècles (in French). Paris: A. Picard.
- Robinson, E.; Smith, E. (1841). Biblical Researches in Palestine, Mount Sinai and Arabia Petraea: A Journal of Travels in the year 1838. Vol. 3. Boston: Crocker & Brewster.
- Röhricht, R. (1893). (RRH) Regesta regni Hierosolymitani (MXCVII-MCCXCI) (in Latin). Berlin: Libraria Academica Wageriana.
- Singer, A. (2002). Constructing Ottoman Beneficence: An Imperial Soup Kitchen in Jerusalem. Albany: State University of New York Press. ISBN 978-0-7914-5352-0.
- Socin, A. (1879). "Alphabetisches Verzeichniss von Ortschaften des Paschalik Jerusalem". Zeitschrift des Deutschen Palästina-Vereins. 2: 135–163.
