= Nujais Shrine =

Mausoleum in Amman, Jordan

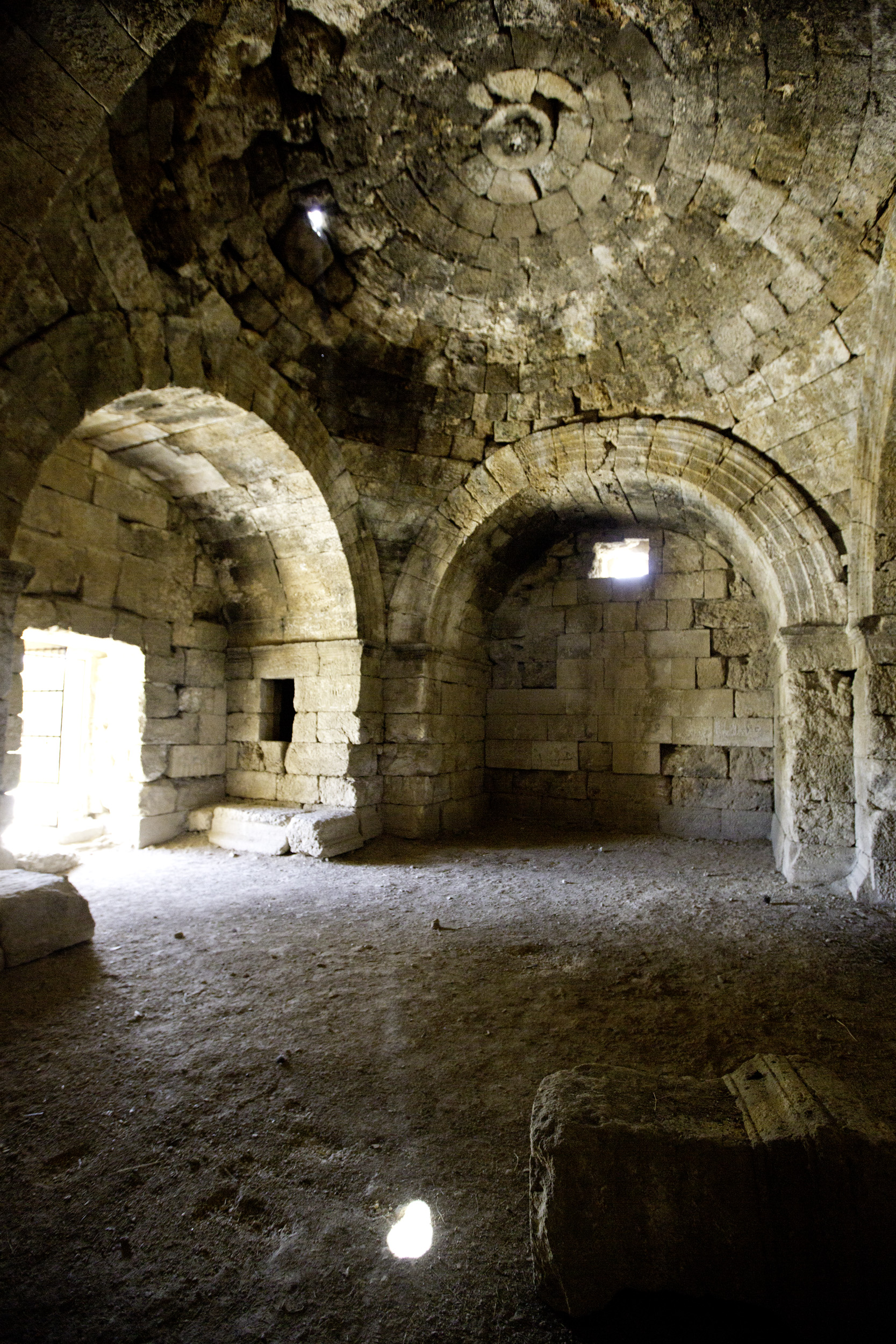
Interior view of the Nujais Shrine.

The Nujais Shrine, Nuwayjis mausoleum or Qaşr al-Nuwayjis is the mausoleum of a Roman family, and is one of the ruins that remains in the city of Amman, Jordan, and is located near Tabarbour, north of Amman, close to the old Roman road in the city of Jerash. It can be reached from the road via Sport City leading to the 'Ain Ghazal region.

== Research history ==
Johann Ludwig Burckhardt was one of the most prominent explorers that visited and described the site in 1812.

It was also visited by Claude Reignier Conder and Dorothy, who pinpointed that the word "Nujais" comes from the word "najas" which was often used in the Ethiopian and Himyaritic Semitic language families to mean "governor's palace." Conder mentions that this particular type of Roman mausoleum and shrine was designated for deceased Roman rulers and military commanders.

== Description ==
The structure was planned to be built of square-shaped white limestone above a mound whose front facade rises about 1.2 meters.

The building consists of a central, square room measuring 9.7 meters surrounded on all corners by a small room measuring 2.2 X 1.7 square meters. It is believed that this room was designated for burial and that it contained stone coffins that have not actually been found except for five remains. Part of their covers were scattered around the structure outside the building perhaps in order to benefit from those rooms. The building is covered with a dome, installed on spherical triangles in order to change the square into a circle.

Oriental features were found atop the dome such as the "smooth jar," which started to appear more frequently in the facades of Nabatean buildings in the city of Petra. Based on the building's decorative and technical features such as the pressed ion crowns, the shrine's history is believed to date back to the end of the second century CE and the beginning of the third.

== See also ==
- Mazor Mausoleum

== Sources ==
- Religious Tourism in Amman by Muhammad Wahib, (2004).
