= El'ad =

El'ad אלעד
- City

Hebrew transcription(s)
  - ISO 259: ʔelˁad
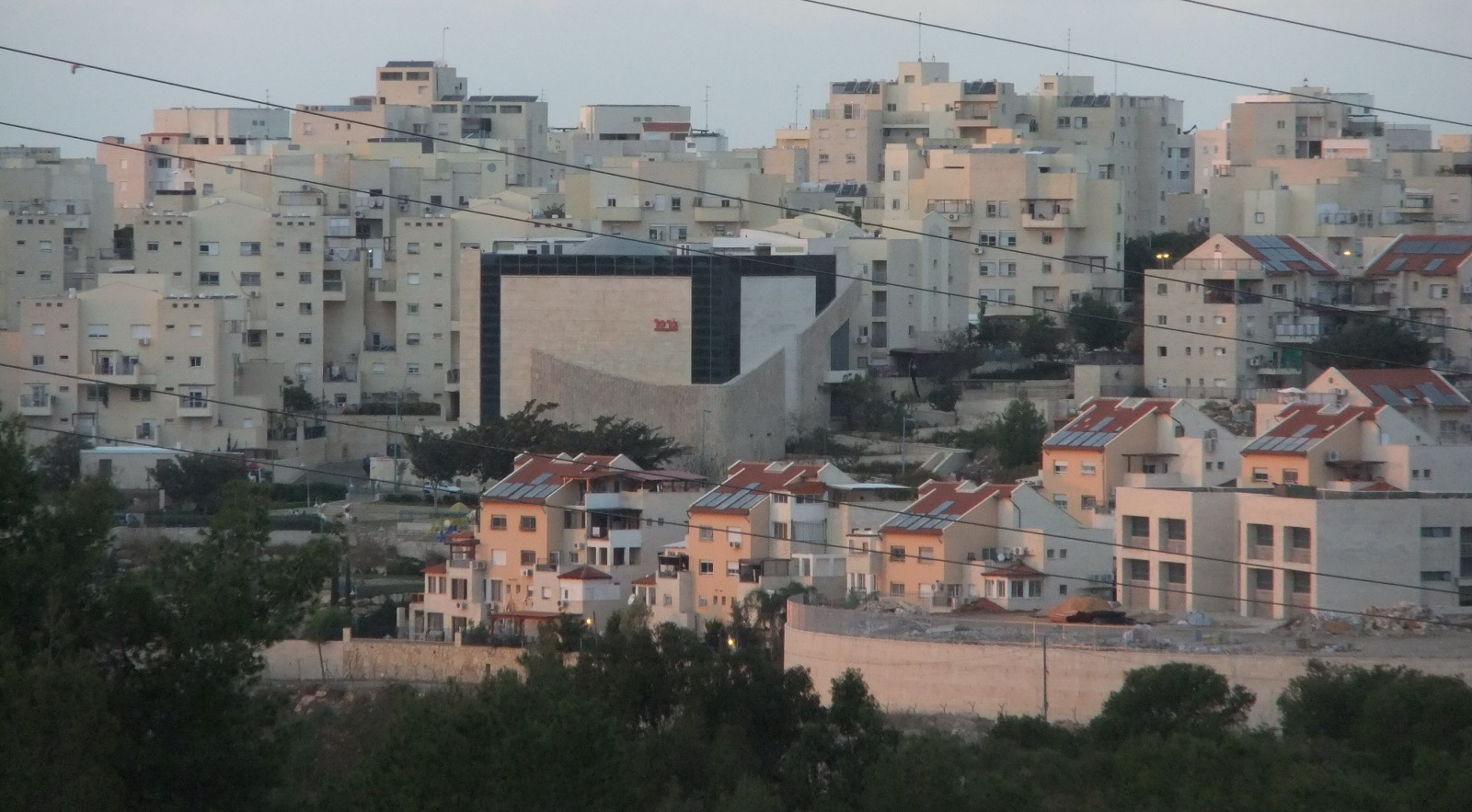
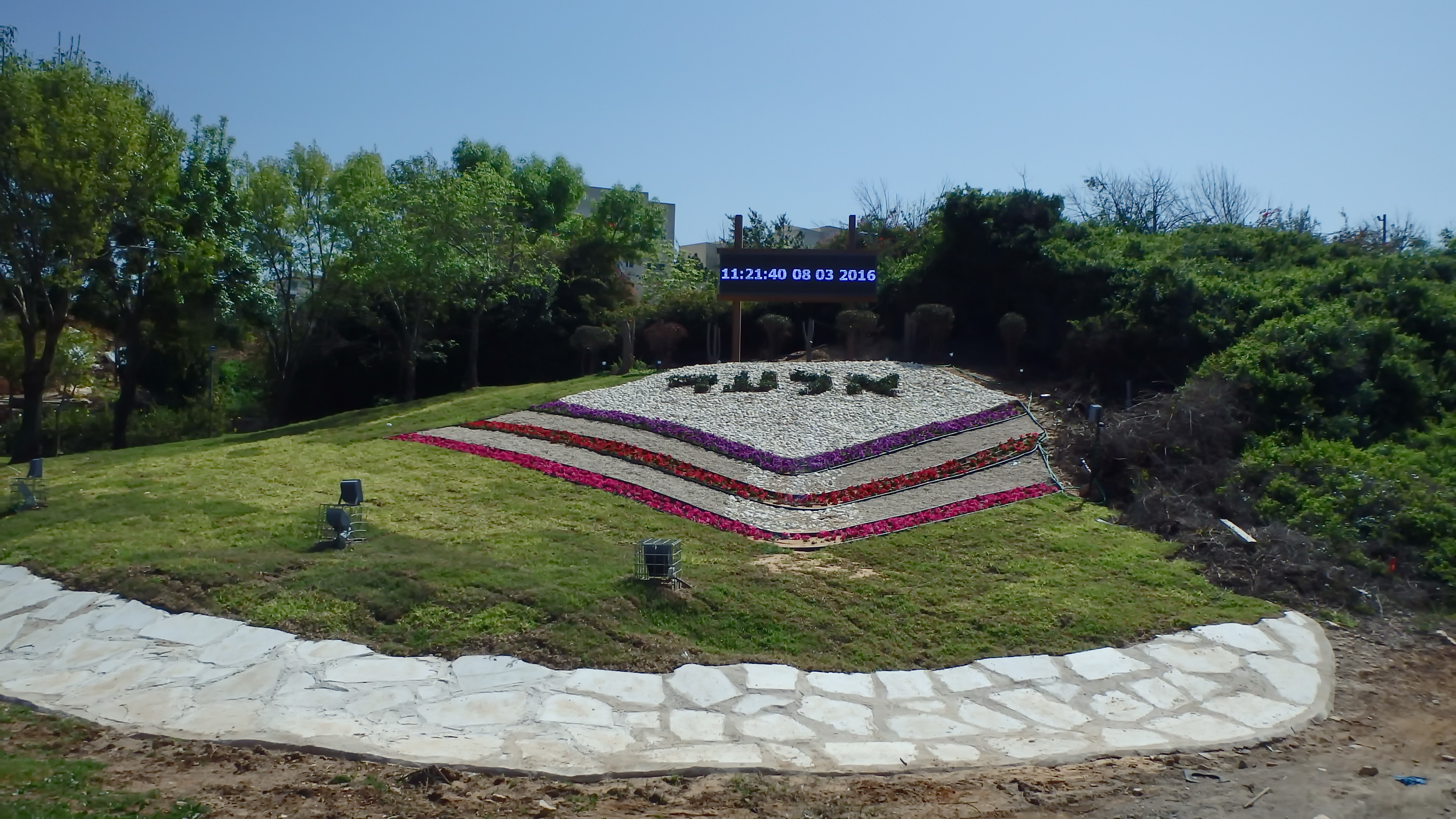
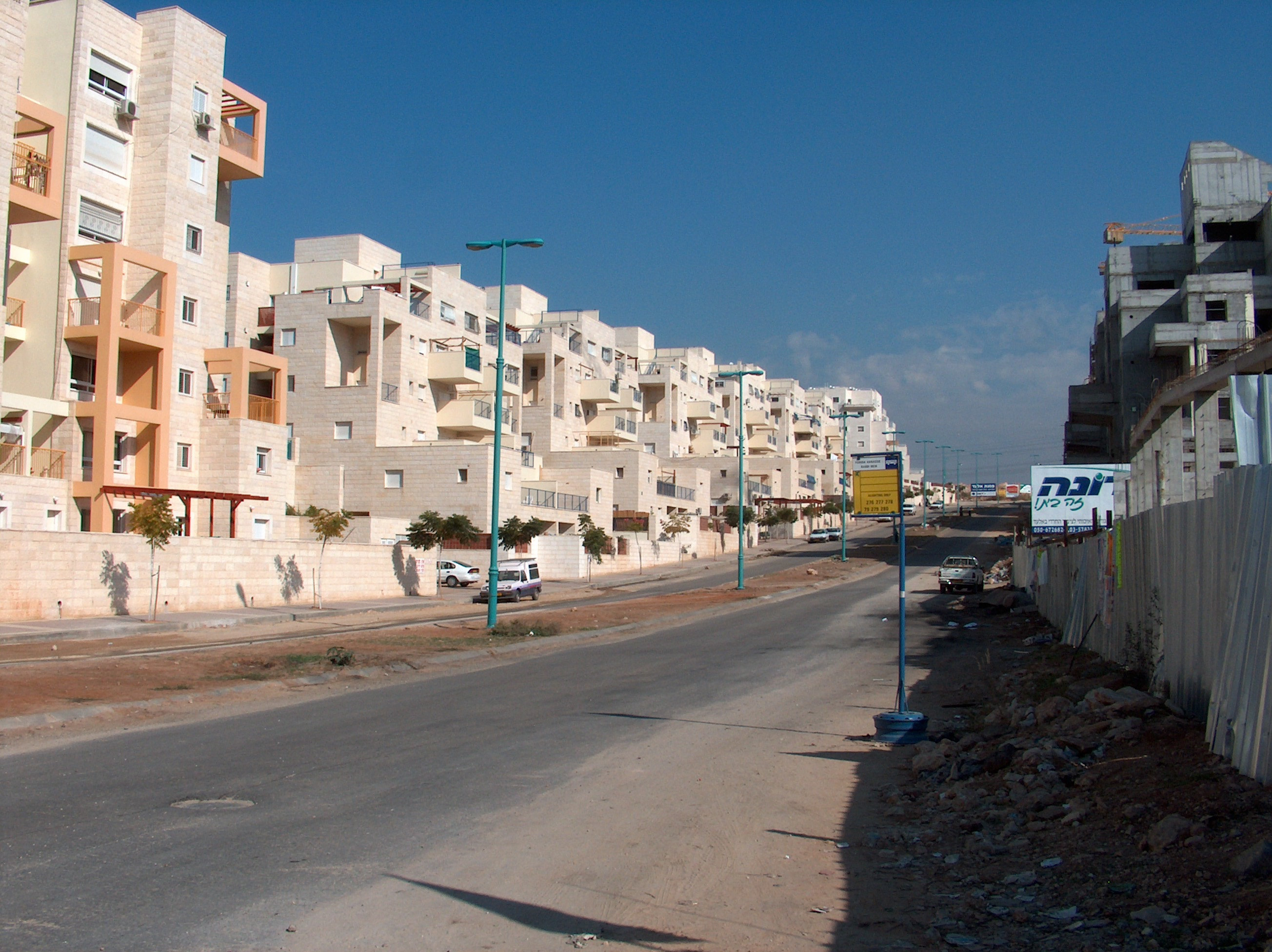
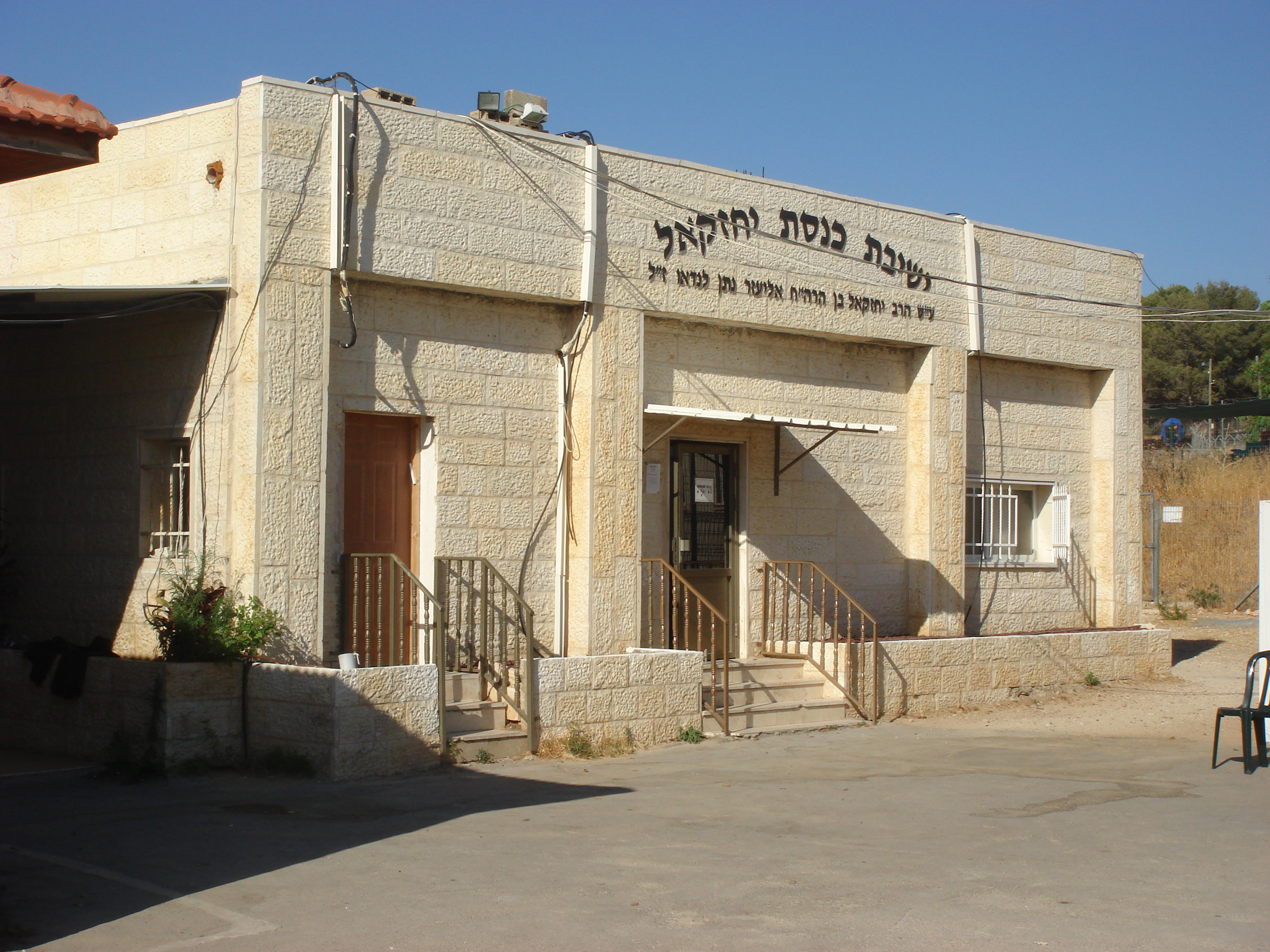
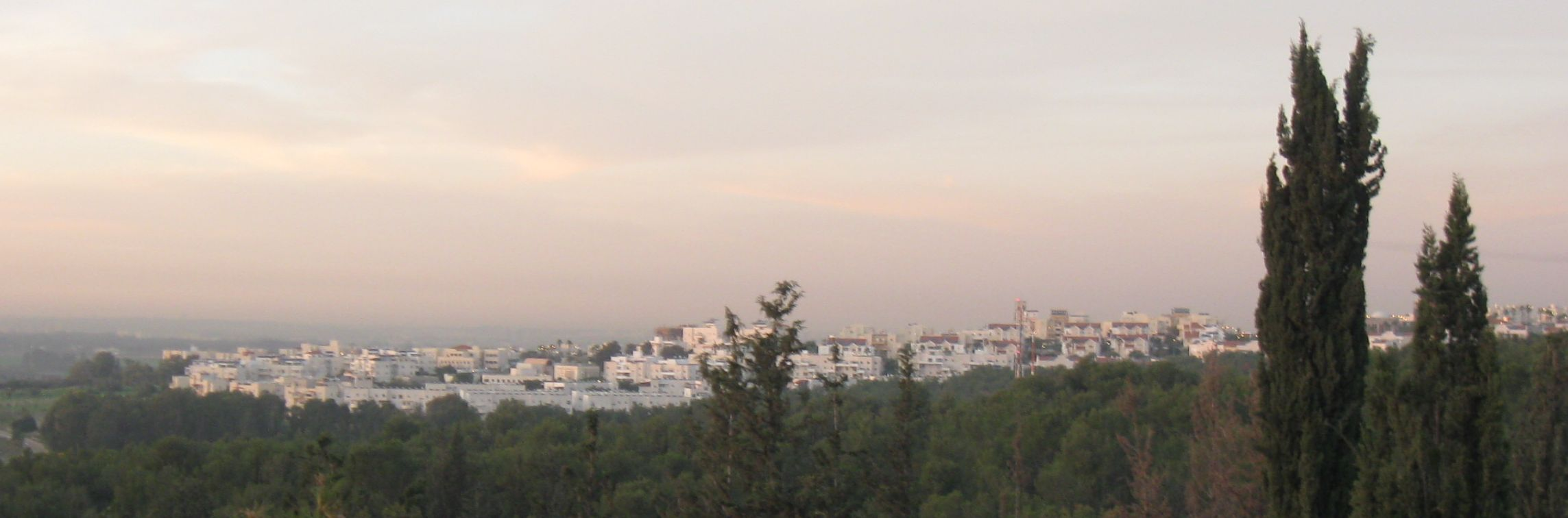

- Coat of arms

- Location within Central Israel Location within Israel
- Coordinates: 32°3′8″N 34°57′4″E
- Country: Israel
- District: Central
- Subdistrict: Petah Tikva
- Natural Region: Petah Tikva
- Founded: 1998

Government
  - Mayor: Ye'uda Butbul (Shas)

Area
  - Total: 2,756 dunams (2.756 km^{2}; 1.064 sq mi)

Population (2024)
  - Total: 50,846
  - Density: 18,450/km^{2} (47,780/sq mi)

Ethnicity
  - Jews and others: 100%
- Website: www.elad.muni.il

El'ad (Hebrew: אלעד) is a city in the Central District of Israel. In the 1990s, it was built for a Haredi population and to a lesser extent, it was also built for a Religious Zionist Jewish population. Located about 25 kilometres (16 mi) east of Tel Aviv on Route 444 between Rosh HaAyin and Shoham, it had a population of 50,846 in 2024.

El'ad is the only locality in Israel officially designated a religious municipality. The name El'ad means "Forever God", but it is also named after a member of the tribe of Ephraim, who lived in this area (1 Chronicles 7:21).

== History ==
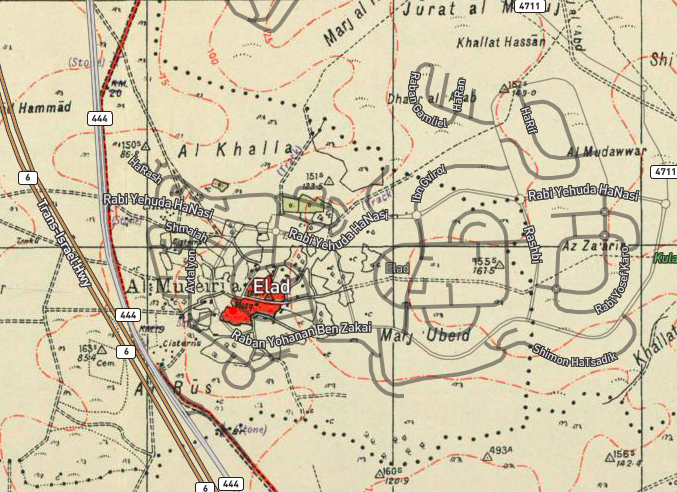
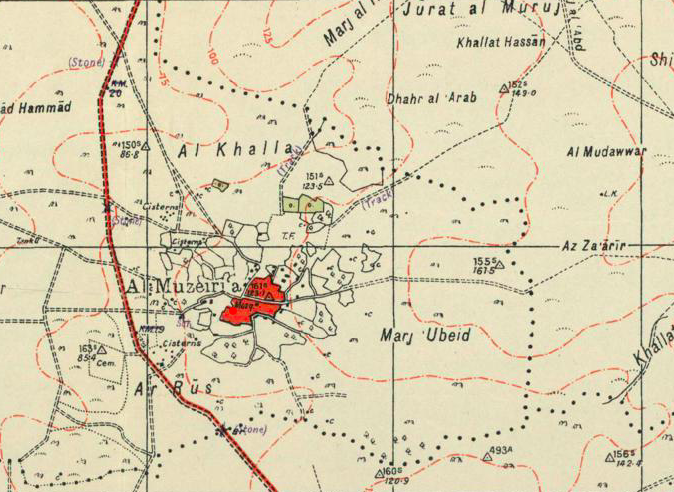
El'ad street map (2018, white text and light grey streets) overlaid on a Survey of Palestine map from 1941 (black text, red urban areas and black streets), showing the relative location of Al-Muzayri'a.

During the 18th and 19th centuries, El'ad was the site of the Arab village of Al-Muzayri'a. It belonged to the Nahiyeh (sub-district) of Lod that encompassed the area of the present-day city of Modi'in-Maccabim-Re'ut in the south to the present-day city of El’ad in the north, and from the foothills in the east, through the Lod Valley to the outskirts of Jaffa in the west. This area was home to thousands of inhabitants in about 20 villages, who had at their disposal tens of thousands of hectares of prime agricultural land. The population of al-Muzayri'a fled in 1948, and El'ad was built partially on its site.

The building of El'ad started in the late 1990s, following a government decision in 1990 to build a series of settlements along the seam line with the West Bank under then-housing minister Ariel Sharon, and provide immediate housing for 50,000 residents. The town was built from scratch as a planned community according to urban planning paradigms not unlike Modi'in and nearby Shoham. While those towns were designed to suit a mixed population of secular and religious Jews, El'ad was originally planned to suit a mixed population of Modern Orthodox/Religious Zionist Jews and ultra-Orthodox Haredi Jews, offering a solution to the acute shortage of affordable housing for Haredi families.

The majority of the population are Haredi Jews. Accordingly, El'ad is built in a way that suits their religious lifestyle, with a larger selection of housing options offering larger than average apartments to accommodate religious families, who tend to have more children than the average national population. Another characteristic is easy access and short walking distances to local education institutions to avoid the need for school transportation costs.

By 1998, El'ad had already achieved local council status; in February 2008, El'ad's official status was changed to a city. The city's current mayor is Yehuda Botbol, a member of the Shas party.

On 5 May 2022 on Israel's Independence Day, in a park in El'ad four people were killed and four wounded in a 2022 El'ad stabbing by two Palestinians.

== Demographics ==
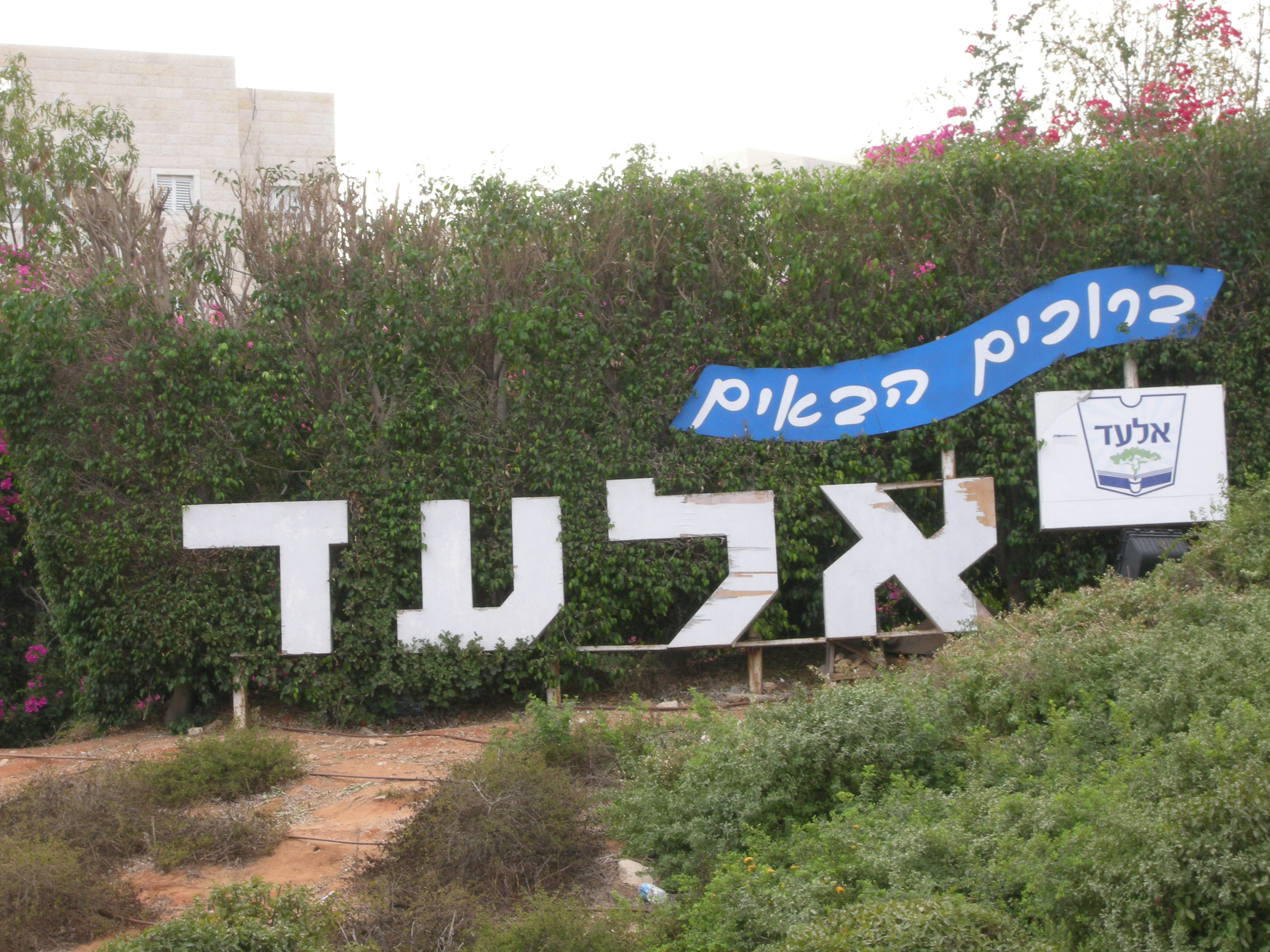
Entrance to El'ad

El'ad is one of the fastest-growing towns in Israel, with an annual population growth of 0.8 percent. The population density per square kilometer is 13.1, median age is 11. The percentage of those eligible for a matriculation certificate among 12th grade students in the year 2019-2020 was 28.3%. The average monthly salary of an employee during the year 2019 was 6,219 NIS (national average: 9,745 NIS).

== Economy ==
The support center of Ramat Gan-based Israeli company Daronet is located in El'ad. Its workers are ultra-Orthodox women. In 2012, Daronet signed a sales agreement worth NIS700,000 (US$180,000) with Saudi energy giant Yanar.

== Voting Patterns ==
In the 2022 election, 99 percent of voters in El'ad voted for the parties of the right-wing coalition led by Benjamin Netanyahu, while 0.4 percent voted for the parties of the center-left coalition led by Yair Lapid and 0.01 percent voted for the Arab parties. 85 percent of voters voted for the Haredi parties Shas or UTJ.

In the 2026 election, 97 percent of voters in El'ad voted for the parties of the right-wing coalition led by Benjamin Netanyahu, while 1 percent voted for the parties of the center-left coalition led by Gadi Eisenkot and 0.01 percent voted for the Arab parties. An additional 0.2 percent voted for the Reservists, and another 0.2 percent voted for Amcha Yisrael. 77 percent of voters voted for the Haredi parties Shas or UTJ. Voter turnout increased 17 percent from the 2022 election.

== Notable people ==
- Asher Dahan, stabbed and killed Rabbi Elazar Abuhatzeira (1948–2011) for allegedly giving him poor marital advice.
- Avishay Shindler, killed by Palestinians terrorists in 2010 at age 24 while driving near Bnei Naim Junction.
- Eyal Yifrah, 19-year old killed in the 2014 kidnapping and murder of Israeli teenagers.

== See also ==
- Mazor Mausoleum – Roman building located in El'ad
