= Al-Muzayri'a =

al-Muzayri'a المُزيرعة al-Muzeiri'a
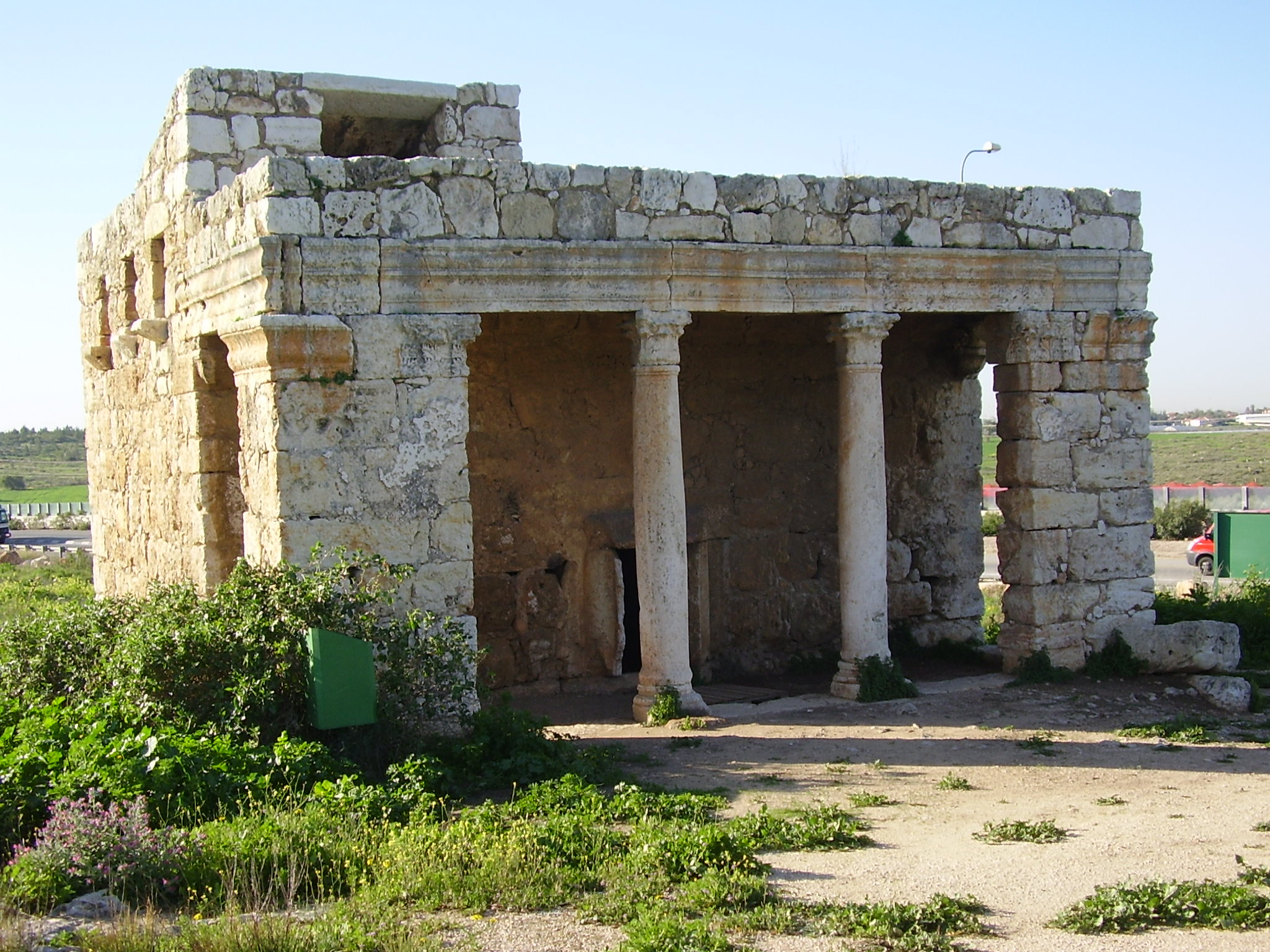
- Roman mausoleum, converted into a shrine and mosque dedicated to an-Nabi Yahya ("Prophet John").
- Etymology: El Mezeirảh, The sown lands
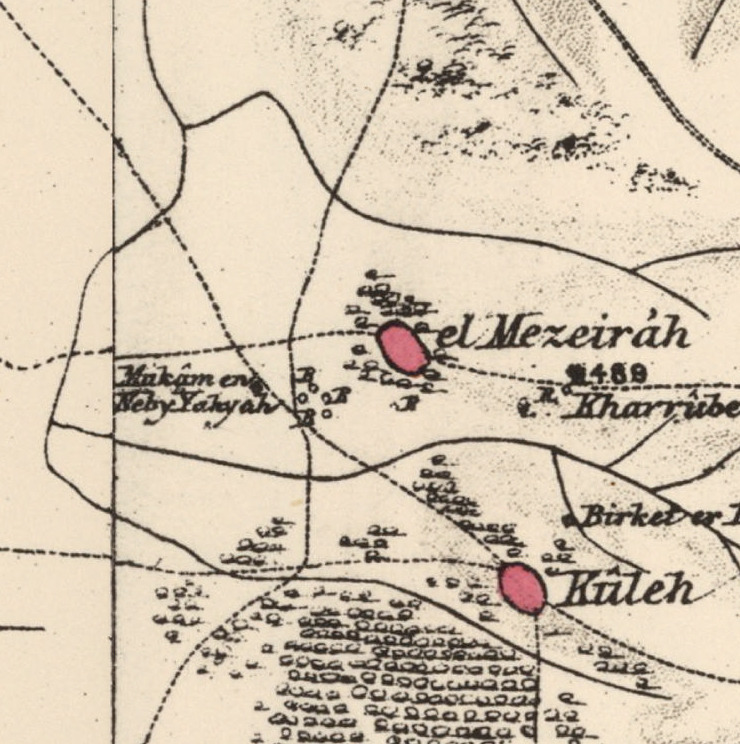
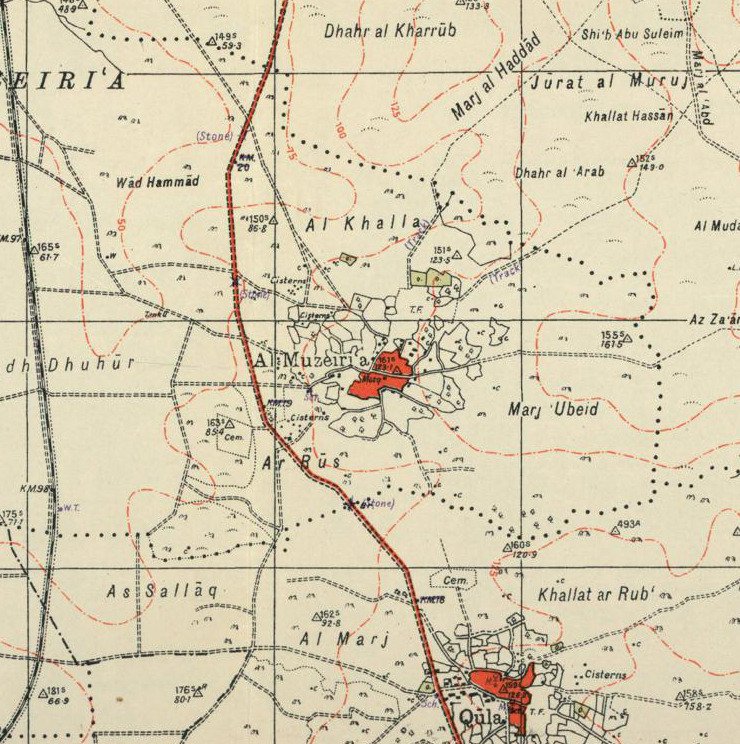
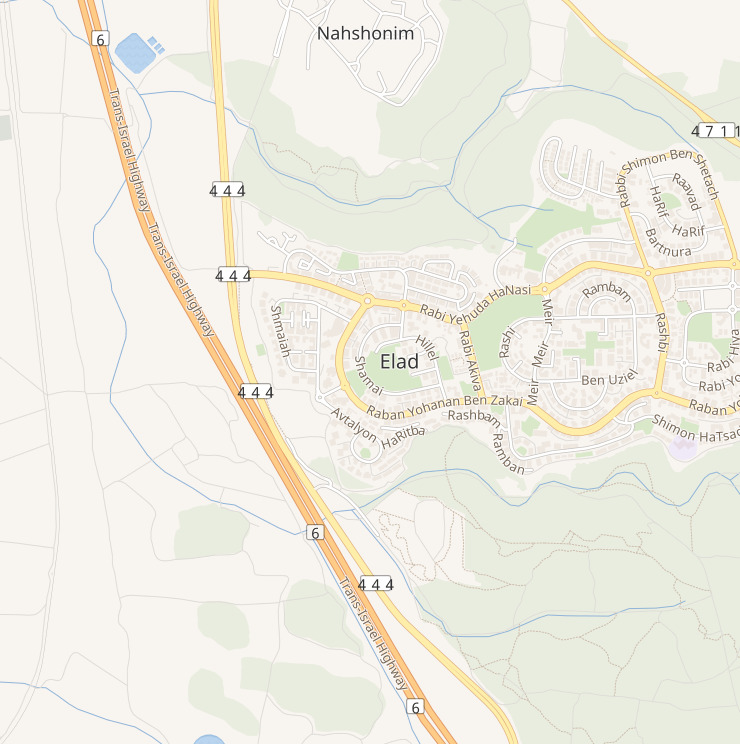
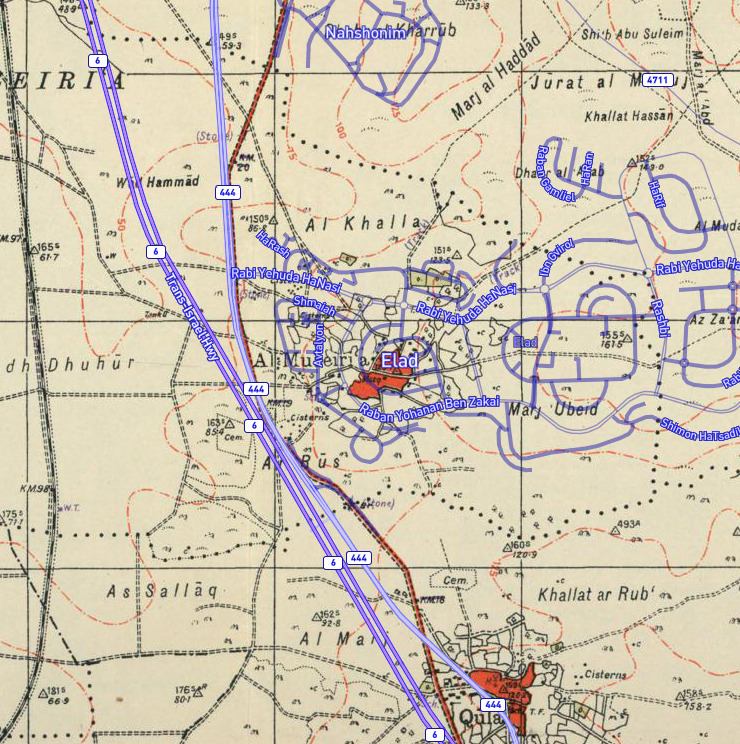
- 1870s map 1940s map modern map 1940s with modern overlay map A series of historical maps of the area around Al-Muzayri'a (click the buttons)

- Location within Mandatory Palestine
- Coordinates: 32°02′57″N 34°56′58″E
- Palestine grid: 145/161
- Geopolitical entity: Mandatory Palestine
- Subdistrict: Ramle
- Date of depopulation: 12 July 1948

Area
  - Total: 10,822 dunams (10.822 km^{2}; 4.178 sq mi)

Population (1945)
  - Total: 1,160
- Cause(s) of depopulation: Military assault by Israeli forces
- Current Localities: Mazor Nechalim El'ad

Al-Muzayri'a (Arabic: المُزيرعة) was a Palestinian village in the Ramle Subdistrict. It was depopulated in 1948. In 1998 the new Israeli city of El'ad was built over the ruins.

== Location ==
Al-Muzayri'a was located 15 kilometers (9.3 mi) north-northeast of al-Ramla, on limestone hill, overlooking the coastal plain. A wadi ran along its southern part, and separated it from the village of Qula. The village was about 1 km east of the al-Ramla-Haifa railway line. It was also located to the east of the al-Ramla-Jaffa highway.

== History ==
The location has a long history of habitation. A Roman mausoleum, still standing (about 1 km south of the village site), was converted into a mosque dedicated to a prophet, al-Nabi Yahya ("the Prophet John"). About 1 km northeast of the village was Khirbat Zikhrin, a Roman-Byzantine site that was again inhabited during the Mamluk and Ottoman periods. The place has been excavated since 1982.

=== Ottoman period ===
In 1596, Al-Muzayri'a was part of the Ottoman Empire, nahiya (subdistrict) of Jabel Qubal under the liwa' (district) of Nablus with a population of 7 Muslim households; an estimated population of thirty-nine. The villagers paid a fixed tax rate of 33,3% on a number of crops, including wheat, barley, and olives, as well as goats, and beehives; a total of 1,300 akçe.

The mention of (atar)Misqāh ibn Rumayḥ /Misqā Ibn Rmēḥ/ “(the remains) of Ibn Rumayḥ’s trough”, in a 1552 endowment document, suggests that the Rumayḥs, who inhabited al-Muzayri‘a during the 18th–20th centuries, probably resided there during the 16th century.

The village was possibly abandoned during the 17th century.

The village was reoccupied in the 18th century by the al-Rumayh family, returning from Dayr Ghassana.

In 1838 el Muzeiri'ah was among the villages Edward Robinson noted from the top of the White Mosque in Ramla, while A. Mansell mentioned passing the village in the early 1860s.

In 1870, Victor Guérin described the village as sitting on a stony hill, noting that its houses appeared small. An Ottoman village list of about the same year showed that "Mezari" had 68 houses and a population of 234, though the population count included men only. It also noted "a very old temple".

In 1882, the PEF's Survey of Western Palestine (SWP) described it as "an adobe village on the edge of the hills, near Qula".

=== British Mandate ===
In the 1922 census of Palestine, conducted by the British Mandate authorities, Muzaira'a had a population of 578, all Muslims, increasing in the 1931 census to 780, still all Muslims, in a total of 186 houses.

In 1919, a school for boys was founded in the village. By 1945, it had become a full-fledged elementary school, with 207 students, including children of the neighboring villages. 35 dunums of land were attached to the school. A school for girls was founded in 1945, and had an initial enrollment of 78 students.

In the 1945 statistics, the village had a population of 1,160, all Muslim, and the total land area was 10,822 dunams. A total of 953 dunums of village land was used for citrus and bananas, 5,895 dunums were used for cereals, 35 dunums were irrigated or used for orchards, while 25 dunams were classified as built-up urban areas.

=== 1948 and aftermath ===
Al-Muzayri'a was located in the territory allotted to the Arab state under the 1947 UN Partition Plan. Al-Muzayri was depopulated on 12 July 1948, after a military assault by Israeli forces.

The Israeli moshav of Nehalim was founded in 1949 on the northwestern part of former village land. The moshav of Mazor was founded the same year on the western part of former village land.

The Palestinian historian Walid Khalidi, described the place in 1992: "The site is largely forested. While a few houses remain, most have been reduced to rubble. Cacti and stone terraces are visible on the site."

== Gallery ==
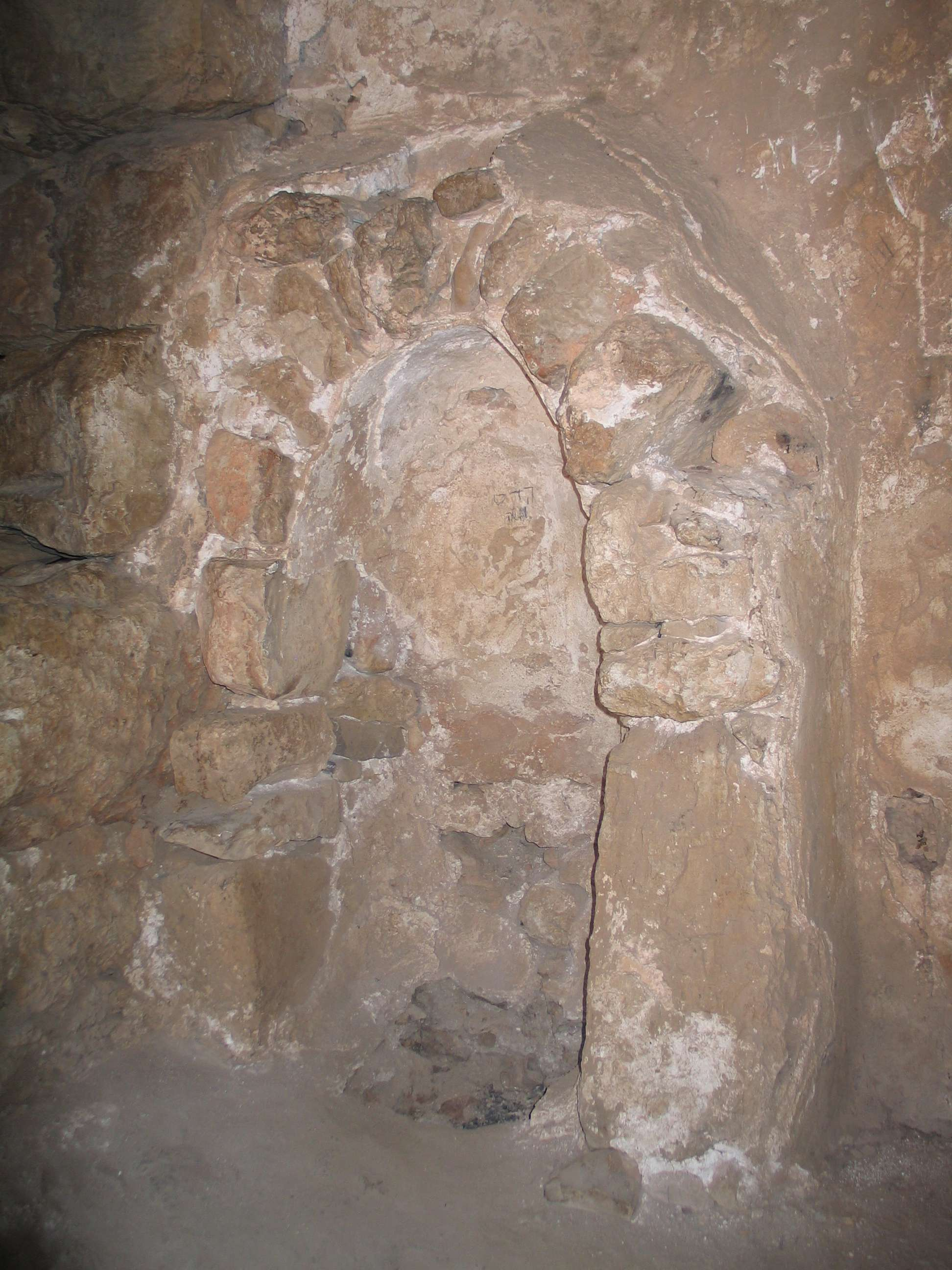
Mihrab, pointing towards Mecca, in the Roman Mausoleum

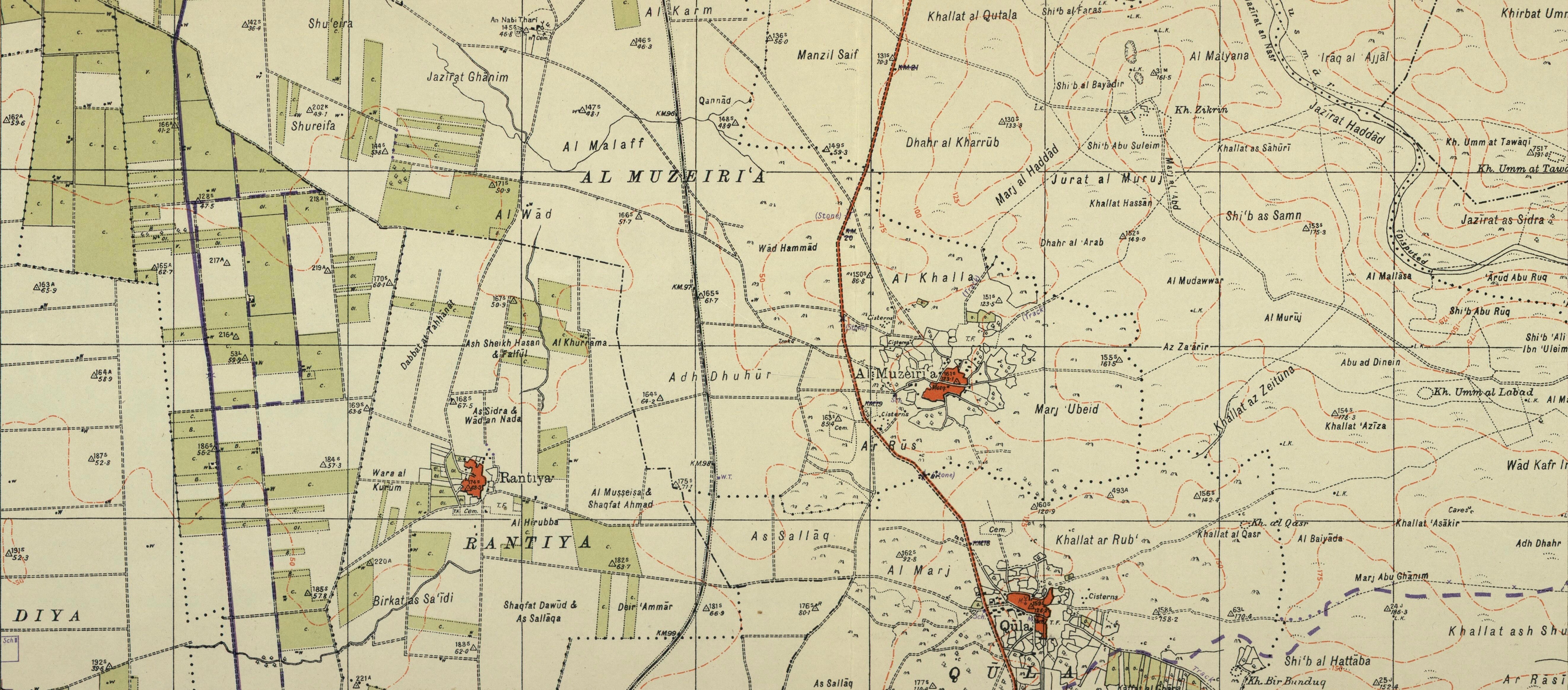
Al-Muzayri'a 1941 1:20,000

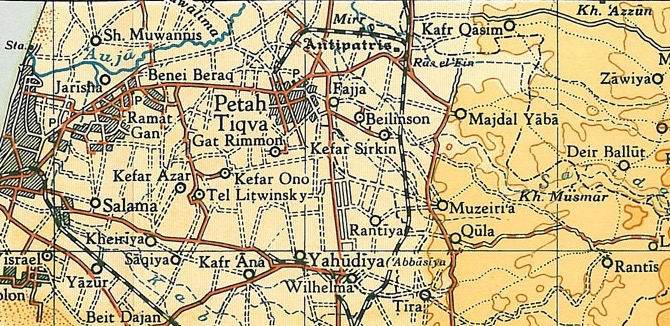
Al-Muzayri'a 1945 1:250,000

== See also ==
- Depopulated Palestinian locations in Israel
- Mazor Mausoleum

== Bibliography ==
- 'Ad, Uzi (5 October 2008). "El'ad (Mazor) Final Report" (120). Hadashot Arkheologiyot – Excavations and Surveys in Israel. Archived from the original on 19 July 2011.
- Barron, J.B., ed. (1923). Palestine: Report and General Abstracts of the Census of 1922. Government of Palestine.
- Conder, C.R.; Kitchener, H.H. (1882). The Survey of Western Palestine: Memoirs of the Topography, Orography, Hydrography, and Archaeology. Vol. 2. London: Committee of the Palestine Exploration Fund.
- Dagan, Yehuda (2 August 2006). "Mazor (East) Final Report" (118). Hadashot Arkheologiyot – Excavations and Surveys in Israel. Archived from the original on 15 December 2007.
- Department of Statistics (1945). Village Statistics, April, 1945. Government of Palestine.
- Guérin, V. (1875). Description Géographique Historique et Archéologique de la Palestine (in French). Vol. 2: Samarie, pt. 2. Paris: L'Imprimerie Nationale.
- Hadawi, S. (1970). Village Statistics of 1945: A Classification of Land and Area ownership in Palestine. Palestine Liberation Organization Research Center. Archived from the original on 8 December 2018.
- Hillel, Gili (4 December 2008). "Mazor (El'ad) Final Report" (120). Hadashot Arkheologiyot – Excavations and Surveys in Israel. Archived from the original on 19 July 2011.
- Hartmann, M. (1883). "Die Ortschaftenliste des Liwa Jerusalem in dem türkischen Staatskalender für Syrien auf das Jahr 1288 der Flucht (1871)". Zeitschrift des Deutschen Palästina-Vereins. 6: 102–149.
- Hütteroth, W.-D.; Abdulfattah, K. (1977). Historical Geography of Palestine, Transjordan and Southern Syria in the Late 16th Century. Erlanger Geographische Arbeiten, Sonderband 5. Erlangen, Germany: Vorstand der Fränkischen Geographischen Gesellschaft. ISBN 3-920405-41-2.
- Jakoel, Eriola (9 May 2017). "Elʽad" (129). Hadashot Arkheologiyot – Excavations and Surveys in Israel.
- Kanias, Tzach (2 April 2008). "Mazor, East Final Report" (120). Hadashot Arkheologiyot – Excavations and Surveys in Israel. Archived from the original on 19 July 2011.
- Khalidi, W. (1992). All That Remains: The Palestinian Villages Occupied and Depopulated by Israel in 1948. Washington D.C.: Institute for Palestine Studies. ISBN 0-88728-224-5.
- Mansell, A. L. (1863): "A Surveying Trip through the Holy Land." The Nautical Magazine and Naval Chronicle. January Issue:36–40. Cited in Khalidi, 1992.
- Milevski, Ianir (16 August 2007). "Mazor Final Report" (119). Hadashot Arkheologiyot – Excavations and Surveys in Israel. Archived from the original on 15 December 2007. ("c. 180 m west of the mausoleum and east of the hill where a Muslim cemetery is located")
- Mills, E., ed. (1932). Census of Palestine 1931. Population of Villages, Towns and Administrative Areas. Jerusalem: Government of Palestine.
- Morris, B. (2004). The Birth of the Palestinian Refugee Problem Revisited. Cambridge University Press. ISBN 978-0-521-00967-6.
- Nagorsky, Alla (2 August 2006). "Mazor Final Report" (118). Hadashot Arkheologiyot – Excavations and Surveys in Israel. Archived from the original on 16 December 2007.
- Palmer, E.H. (1881). The Survey of Western Palestine: Arabic and English Name Lists Collected During the Survey by Lieutenants Conder and Kitchener, R. E. Transliterated and Explained by E.H. Palmer. Committee of the Palestine Exploration Fund.
- Robinson, E.; Smith, E. (1841). Biblical Researches in Palestine, Mount Sinai and Arabia Petraea: A Journal of Travels in the year 1838. Vol. 3. Boston: Crocker & Brewster.
- Socin, A. (1879). "Alphabetisches Verzeichniss von Ortschaften des Paschalik Jerusalem". Zeitschrift des Deutschen Palästina-Vereins. 2: 135–163.
- Taxel, Itamar (15 November 2006). "Mazor Final Report" (118). Hadashot Arkheologiyot – Excavations and Surveys in Israel. Archived from the original on 15 December 2007.
