= Prince Hamza Hospital =

Coordinates: 31°59′4″N 35°56′10″E

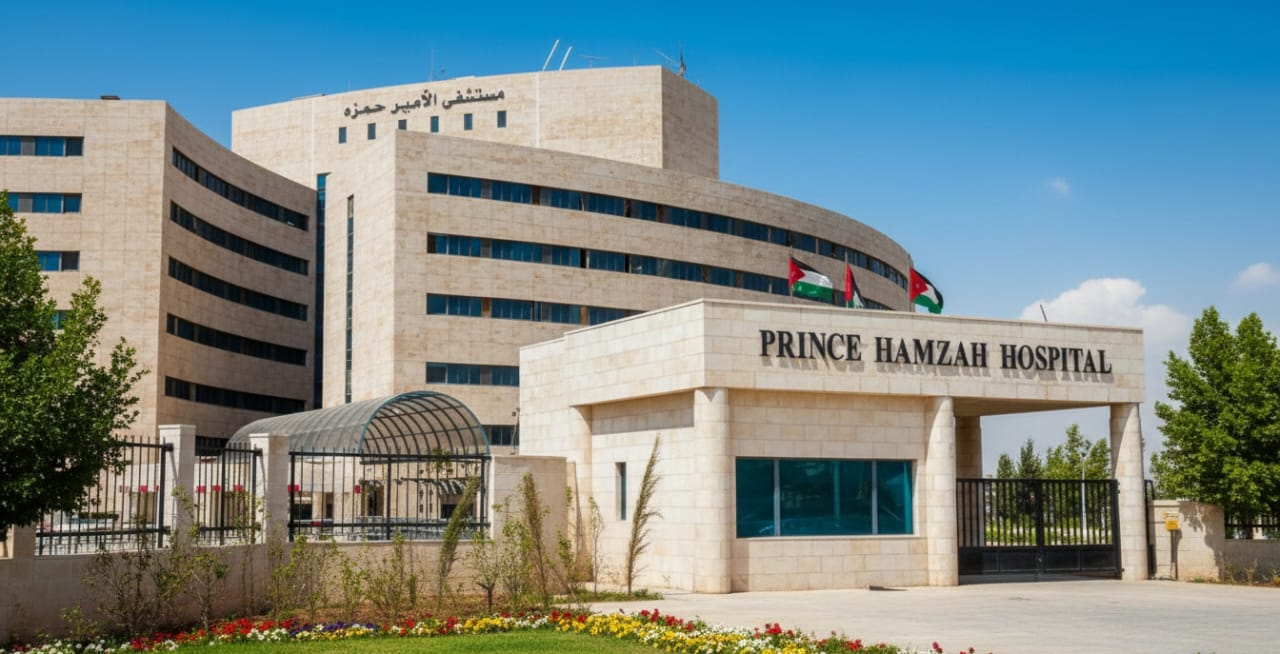

Geography
- Location: Tabarbour, Amman, Jordan

Organisation
- Type: District General
- Affiliated university: Governmental system of decentralization

Services
- Beds: 434

Helipads
- Helipad: Yes

History
- Founded: 25-6-2006

Links
- Website: https://moh.gov.jo/en/Subsite/Hamza

Prince Hamzah Hospital is a 436-bed district general hospital located in the Jordanian capital, Amman. Established in 2006, its construction and equipment cost around 56 million Jordanian dinars (approximately 2024's US$79 million).

The facility was recognized by the Jordanian Medical Council as an educational hospital in 2010. It is a government hospital with a decentralized system that places direct bids for medicines and medical devices without waiting for the arrangements of the Ministry of Health.

== Medical services ==
The hospital performs cardiac surgeries, cardiac catheters, diagnostic and therapeutic vascular procedures, and kidney transplants.

== Links ==
Prince Hamza Hospital official page, part of Ministry of Health website
