= Mazor =

Moshav in central Israel

Mazor: מָזוֹר (Hebrew)
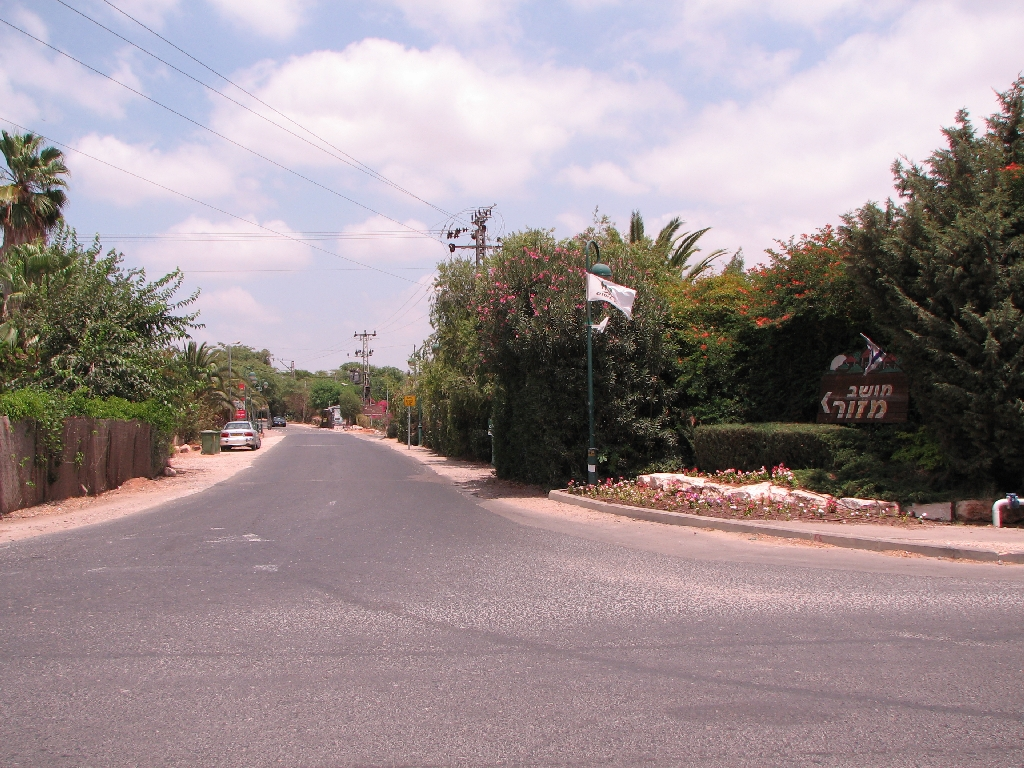

- Location within Central Israel Location within Israel
- Coordinates: 32°3′9″N 34°55′33.95″E
- Country: Israel
- District: Central
- Subdistrict: Petah Tikva
- Council: Hevel Modi'in
- Affiliation: Moshavim Movement
- Founded: 1949
- Founder: Jewish immigrants from Czechoslovakia and Hungary and sabras
- Population (2024): 1,115

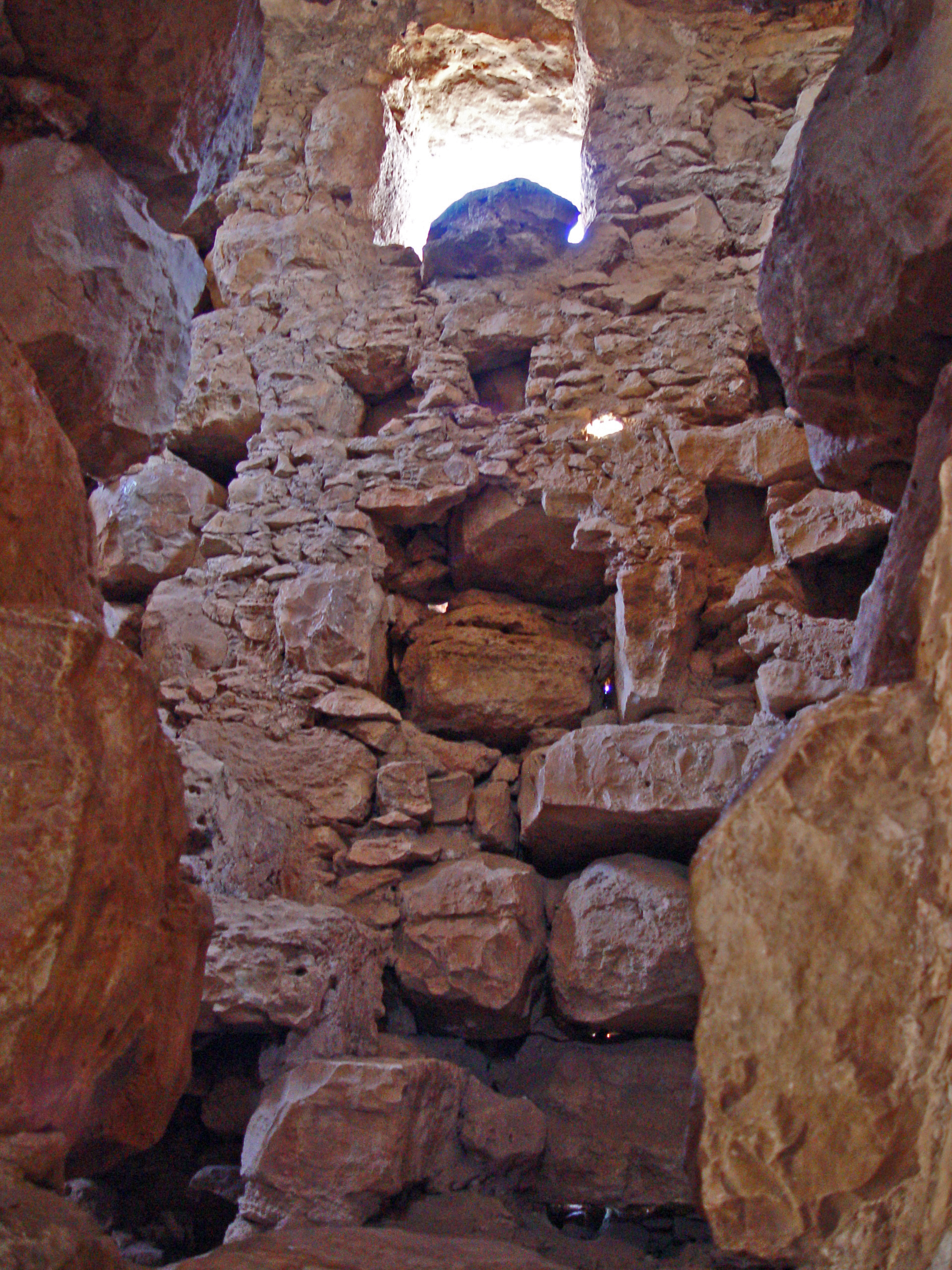
Columbarium in Mazor mausoleum

Mazor (Hebrew: מָזוֹר, lit. 'Cure') is a moshav in the Central District of Israel. Located in the southeastern corner of the Sharon Plain, around three kilometres south-east of Petah Tikva and covering 2,300 dunams, it falls under the jurisdiction of Hevel Modi'in Regional Council. In 2024 it had a population of 1,115.

== History ==
The moshav was established in 1949 by Jewish immigrants from Czechoslovakia and Hungary and Syria and by native-born Israelis. It was initially named Mizra Har (Hebrew: מזרע הר, lit. Sown Field on a Mountain), a name derived from the name of the nearby depopulated Arab village of Umm-Zara, more commonly known as al-Muzayri'a. The moshav was later renamed Mazor, Hebrew for Remedy, in honor of the medicinal herb factory established there by the herbalist Mordechai Klein. Mazor's early days are depicted in a work of historical fiction, Kfar BaSfar ("A Village on the Border") by Gershon Erich Steiner, one of Mazor's founders.

Mazor was founded on land near the depopulated Palestinian villages of Rantiya, and al-Muzayri'a.

To the east of the moshav is an archaeological site, which includes a 3rd Century Roman mausoleum. The mausoleum is the only Roman era building in Israel to still stand from its foundations to its roof. A Byzantine-era mosaic floor was found not far from the mausoleum.

== Notable residents ==
- Gili Sharir (born 1999), Israeli Olympic bronze medalist judoka
