= Mazor Mausoleum =

Roman building in El'ad, Israel

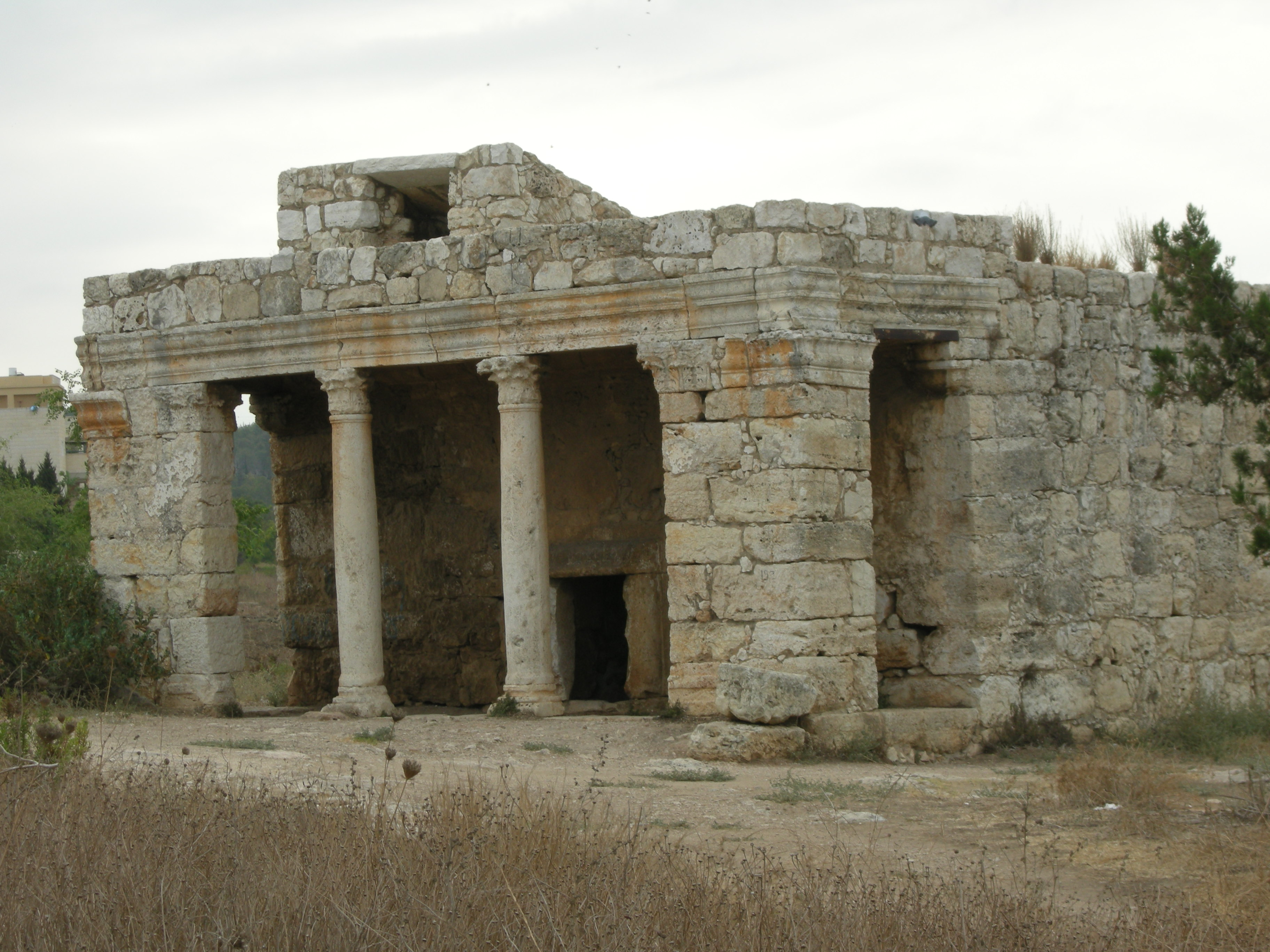
- Interactive map of Mazor Mausoleum
- Location: Mazor, Israel
- Coordinates: 32.0465°N 34.9461°E
- Type: Mausoleum
- Completion date: 3rd century AD

The Mazor Mausoleum (Hebrew: מאוזוליאום מזור) is one of the best preserved Roman buildings in Israel, located in El'ad. The Mausoleum, which is the only Roman era building in Israel to still stand from its foundations to its roof, was built for an important Roman man and his wife in the 3rd century AD. Their identities remain a mystery but one can still see the remnants of two sarcophagi in the mausoleum.

== History ==
The mausoleum is dated to the late third to late fourth centuries AD, based on excavations conducted at the site by J. Kaplan in the 1980s.

In the Early Muslim period, Muslims added a mihrab (prayer niche) in the southern wall, indicating the direction of Mecca, and the building became an Islamic holy place called Maqam en-Neby Yahyah (Arabic: مقام النبي يحيى, 'Shrine of the Prophet John'). Due to its sacredness, the building was preserved through the ages. It functioned as a mosque until the depopulation of the Palestinian village Al-Muzayri'a in 1948.

In July 1949, Israel decided to raze the mausoleum, after the Israeli Ground Forces had used the building for target practice. However, an antiquities inspector managed to stop the destruction.

== Nowadays ==
The Mazor mausoleum has been declared a "national park" and is currently under the management of Israel's National Parks Authority.

== See also ==
- Nujais shrine

== Bibliography ==
- Conder, C.R.; Kitchener, H.H. (1882). The Survey of Western Palestine: Memoirs of the Topography, Orography, Hydrography, and Archaeology. Vol. 2. London: Committee of the Palestine Exploration Fund.
