= Tabarbour =

- Location in Amman and Jordan
- Coordinates: 32°00′11″N 35°56′25″E
- Country: Jordan
- City: Amman

Tabarbour is one of the largest areas of Tariq municipality in Amman, Jordan. Near the entrance to the area lie Roman ruins with a dedication to a great leader at the time.

The area is inhabited by approximately 950,000 people. It is one of the most populated areas of Amman due to its strategic location, linking all regions of Amman and the north and central governorates.

Tabarbour is located in the north of the capital, Amman. It is located at 920 meters above sea level.

== History ==
The meaning of the word Tabarbour is "wasteland which the ax cannot penetrate." ("Tabar" is a small ax, and "por" is rocky land which cannot be cultivated.) Tabarbour became famous for the abundance of treasures buried within, to the extent that some Jordanians refer to it as the "treasury" due to discovered buried gold from the Ottoman era.

== Sights ==
Tarbarbour is where the Mausoleum of the Nuegis is located, which is a Roman mausoleum dating back to the third century AD. There is also a large castle often visited by international tourists.

== Environment ==
Due to the prevalence of quarries, residents of the Al-Ghaba Tabarbour neighborhood suffer impacts of pollution.

== Economy ==
Tabarbour is home to many shops and is often filled with sellers, consumers, and investors. It serves as a vital shopping center in Jordan.

Within Tabarbour also is the headquarters of the General Command of the Jordanian Armed Forces. This includes the office of the Supreme Commander of the Armed Forces, King Abdullah II, in addition to the Military Sports Federation and the Armed Forces Hotel. It also includes a camp for the Jordanian Special Forces in the far south of the area, a camp for the Arab Army, and a camp for the gendarmerie.
