= Beit Qufa =

Archaeological site in Israel

- بيت قوفا (Arabic)
- Interactive map of Beit Qufa
- 31°58′24.6″N 34°57′31.7″E
- Periods: Middle Bronze Age, Byzantine, Umayyad, Abbasid, and Ottoman
- Cultures: Early Islamic, Palestinian

Beit Qufa (Arabic: بيت قوفا) is an archaeological site in the Lod Valley, near the modern Israeli settlement of Beit Nehemia in Israel's Central District.

== History ==
The site of Beit Qufa was inhabited since antiquity. Salvage excavations revealed settlement remains from the Middle Bronze Age I, in addition to a settlement, a bathhouse, terraces and a lime-kiln from the Byzantine and Early Islamic periods (Umayyad and Abbasid periods).

The village of Beit Qufa was incorporated into the Ottoman Empire in 1517 with all of Palestine. In 1596 it appeared in the tax registers as being in the nahiya of Ramla, under the administration of the liwa of Gaza. It had a population of 16 households who were all Muslims. They paid a fixed tax-rate of 25% on agricultural products, including wheat, barley, summer crops, goats and beehives, in addition to occasional revenues; a total of 4,100 akçe. All of the revenue went to a waqf dedicated to the Cave of the Patriarchs.

In the 17th century, the village of Bayt Qūfā was abandoned due to unsettled conditions, and its residents scattered between Bayt Nabala and the villages of ‘Ajjūl and ‘Arūra near Ramallah.

During the 18th and 19th centuries, the area around Beit Qufa belonged to the nahiya of Lod that encompassed the area of the present-day city of Modi'in-Maccabim-Re'ut in the south to the present-day city of El'ad in the north, and from the foothills in the east, through the Lod Valley to the outskirts of Jaffa in the west. This area was home to thousands of nhabitants who resided in about 20 villages.

According to Marom, local tradition holds that sometime during the 18th century, a Yamani immigrant from the Khuzā‘a tribe, named Sallam b. Ḥarfush, camped in the caves near Bayt Qūfā. When a conflict broke out between Bayt Nabala and al-Ḥadītha, Sallam took advantage of the plight of the residents of Bayt Nabala to gain control over them, and his three “sons” – Zayd, Nakhla and Ṣāfī – settled in Bayt Nabala. The lands of Beit Qufa were thus subsumed by the village of Beit Nabala.
