= 'Arura =

Palestinian Village

- Municipality type C

Arabic transcription(s)
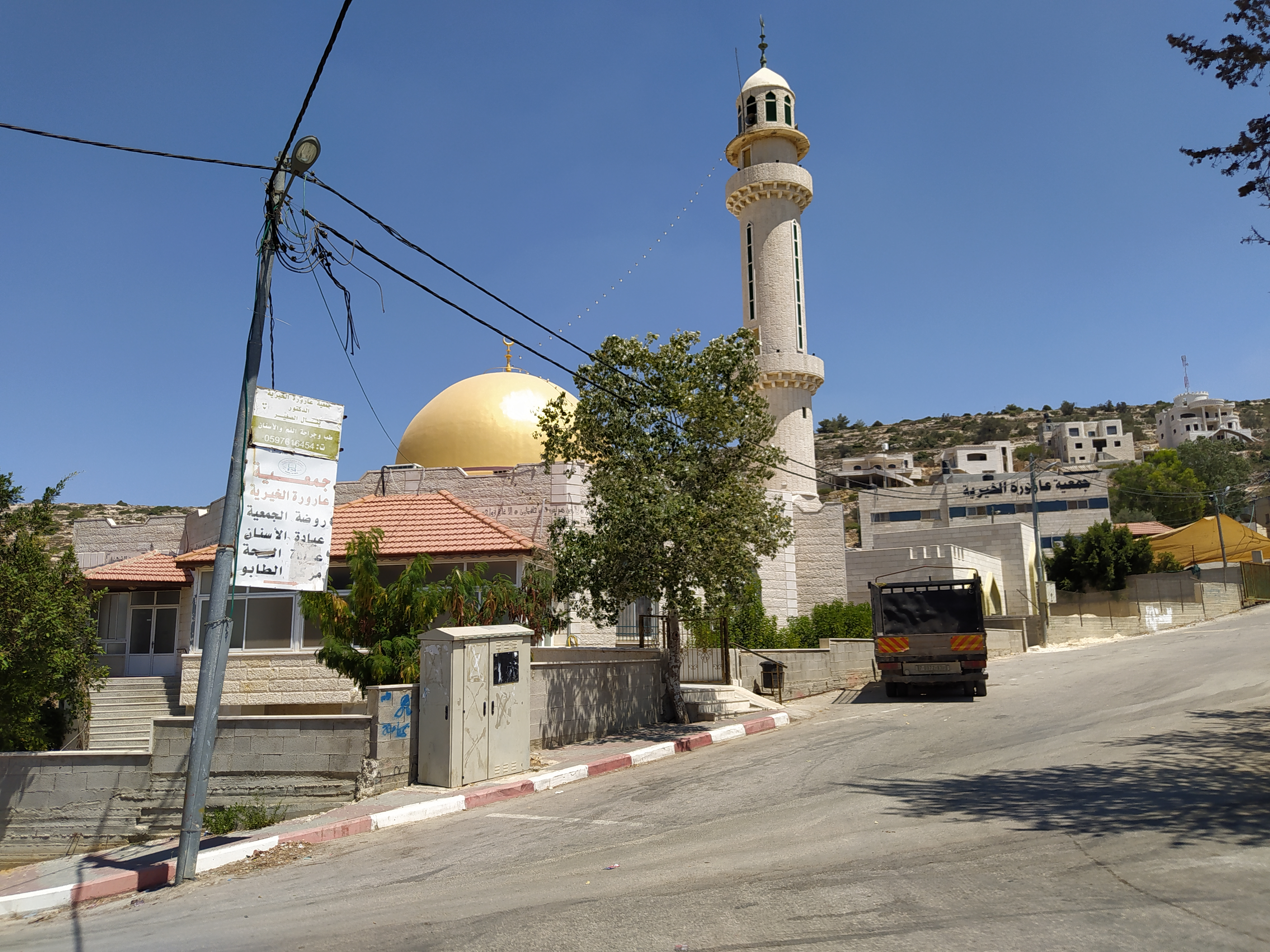
- 'Arura

- Location of 'Arura within Palestine
- Coordinates: 32°02′30″N 35°10′18″E
- Palestine grid: 166/160
- State: Palestine
- Governorate: Ramallah and al-Bireh

Government
  - Type: Municipality

Population (2017)
  - Total: 3,107
- Name meaning: p.n.

‘Arura (Arabic: عارورة, romanized: ‘Arūrā) is a Palestinian town located in the Ramallah and al-Bireh Governorate in the northern West Bank, north of Ramallah. Most of the village is situated 500 meters above sea level.

== History ==
Pottery sherds from the IA I, IA II, Persian, Hellenistic, Roman, Byzantine and Crusader/Ayyubid eras have been found here.

Near, and within the village are three shrines dedicated to Sheikh Radwan, Sheikh Ahmad, and al-Khidr. Al-Khidr's shrine, in the center of the village, has no relation to al-Khidr, and his simply dedicated to a holy man with the same name. Al-Khidr or Saint George is revered throughout Palestine in several towns and villages. Sheikh Ahmad's shrine is to the west of 'Arura.

The Shrine of Sheikh Radwan bin 'Ulayl al-Arsufi, built during the Ayyubid rule of interior Palestine, is located to the southwest of the village situated on a hill roughly 600 meters (2,000 ft) above sea level. Not much is known about Radwan, except that his family was from Arsuf and he was an important man in the area that died in Egypt and was transferred to 'Arura for his burial. Muslim scholars suggested that Sheikh Radwan was from the 'Ulayl family. An Arabic inscription written in typical rural Ayyubid style, on the shrine's surface reads that he was transferred to "blessed Syria" (in early Islamic times, Palestine was a province of Syria). A mosque was constructed adjacent to the shrine.

Pottery sherds from the Mamluk era have also been found here.

=== Ottoman era ===
In 1596 'Arura appeared in the Ottoman tax registers as being in the Nahiya of Quds of the Liwa of Quds. It had a population of 62 households, all Muslim, who paid a fixed tax rate of 33,3% on agricultural products, including on wheat, barley, olive trees, vineyards and fruit trees, goats and/or beehives; a total of 12,000 akçe. 1/6 of the revenue went to a Waqf.

In the 17th century, the village received an influx of refugees from Beit Qufa near Lydda, who had to abandon their home due to unsettled conditions.

In 1838 'Arurah was noted as a Muslim village, part of the Beni Zeid area, located north of Jerusalem.

Victor Guérin visited the village in the late 19th century, and found it to have about 350-400 inhabitants. He also observed fragments of columns and other indications of an ancient town. There were also threshing-floors which appeared ancient.

Socin found from an official Ottoman village list from about 1870 that Arura had a total of 91 houses and a population of 300, though the population count included men, only.

In 1882, the PEF's Survey of Western Palestine described the village, called Arara, as being a small, on high ground, and remarkable for having five sacred places on the west side of the village.

In 1896 the different parts of Arura was estimated to have about 237, 99 and 204 inhabitants; in all a population of 540 persons.

=== British Mandate era ===
In the 1922 census of Palestine conducted by the British Mandate authorities, 'Arura had a population of 426 Muslim, increasing in the 1931 census to 566 Muslim, in 131 houses.

The 1945 statistics found 660 Muslim inhabitants, with a total land area of 10,978 dunams. Of this, 7,095 were used for plantations and irrigable land, 787 for cereals, while 26 dunams were classified as built-up areas.

=== Jordanian era ===
In the wake of the 1948 Arab–Israeli War, and after the 1949 Armistice Agreements, 'Arura came under Jordanian rule.

In 1961, the population of 'Arura was 1,337.

=== Post 1967 ===
Since the Six-Day War in 1967, 'Arura has been under Israeli occupation.

There was a sharp decrease in the population from 1961 to 1982, caused by nearly half of 'Arura's inhabitants fleeing the village in the 1967 Six-Day War. In 1997, 'Arura had a population of 2,087, of which 30 residents (1.4%) were Palestinian refugees. The gender make-up was 1,069 males and 1,018 females.

== Shrines ==
Near and within 'Arura are three shrines dedicate to Sheikh Radwan, Sheikh Ahmad, and al-Khidr. Al-Khidr's shrine, in the center of the village, has no relation to al-Khidr and his simply dedicated to him. Al-Khidr or Saint George is revered throughout Palestine in several towns and villages. Sheikh Ahmad shrine is to the west of 'Arura.

The Shrine of Sheikh Radwan bin 'Ulayl al-Arsufi, built during the Ayyubid rule of interior Palestine, is located to the southwest of the village situated on a hill roughly 600 meters above sea level. Not much is known about Radwan, except that he was an important man – whose ancestors were from Arsuf – in the area that died in Egypt and was transferred to 'Arura for his burial. Muslim scholars suggested that Sheikh Radwan was from the 'Ulayl family. An Arabic inscription written in typical rural Ayyubid style, on the shrine's surface reads that he was transferred to "blessed Syria" (in early Islamic times, Palestine was referred to as a province in Syria). A mosque was constructed adjacent to the shrine.

== Geography ==
'Arura is located in the Bani Zeid area of central Samaria, situated 500 meters above sea level. It is 15 km (9.3 mi) northwest of Ramallah and 3 km (1.9 mi) north of Ajjul. Other nearby localities include Mazari an-Nubani to the northeast, Deir as-Sudan to southeast, Kafr Ein to the east, and Abwein to the southwest. In 1945, 'Arura's total land area was 10,978 dunams, of which was 26 were built-up areas and 2,550 used for olive groves.

== Notable people ==
Saleh al-Arouri (1966 – 2024), a senior leader of Hamas and a founding commander of its military wing, the Izz ad-Din al-Qassam Brigades.

== Demographics ==
In the 1922 British survey of Palestine, 'Arura had 426 inhabitants rising to 566 in the 1931 census. There were 660 residents in 1945, according to Sami Hadawi's land and population survey. There was a sharp decrease in the population from 1961 to 1982, caused by nearly half of 'Arura's inhabitants fleeing the village in the 1967 Six-Day War. In 1997, 'Arura had a population of 2,087, of which 30 residents (1.4%) were Palestinian refugees. The gender make-up was 1,069 males and 1,018 females. According to the Palestinian Central Bureau of Statistics, it had a population of approximately 2,967 in mid-year 2006 and 3,107 by 2017.

== Bibliography ==
- Barron, J. B., ed. (1923). Palestine: Report and General Abstracts of the Census of 1922. Government of Palestine.
- Conder, C.R.; Kitchener, H.H. (1882). The Survey of Western Palestine: Memoirs of the Topography, Orography, Hydrography, and Archaeology. Vol. 2. London: Committee of the Palestine Exploration Fund.
- Dauphin, C. (1998). La Palestine byzantine, Peuplement et Populations. BAR International Series 726 (in French). Vol. III : Catalogue. Oxford: Archeopress. ISBN 0-86054-905-4.
- Finkelstein, I.; Lederman, Zvi, eds. (1997). Highlands of many cultures. Tel Aviv: Institute of Archaeology of Tel Aviv University Publications Section. ISBN 965-440-007-3.
- Government of Jordan, Department of Statistics (1964). First Census of Population and Housing. Volume I: Final Tables; General Characteristics of the Population (PDF).
- Government of Palestine, Department of Statistics (1945). Village Statistics, April, 1945.
- Guérin, V. (1875). Description Géographique Historique et Archéologique de la Palestine (in French). Vol. 2: Samarie, pt. 2. Paris: L'Imprimerie Nationale.
- Hadawi, S. (1970). Village Statistics of 1945: A Classification of Land and Area ownership in Palestine. Palestine Liberation Organization Research Centre.
- Hartmann, M. (1883). "Die Ortschaftenliste des Liwa Jerusalem in dem türkischen Staatskalender für Syrien auf das Jahr 1288 der Flucht (1871)". Zeitschrift des Deutschen Palästina-Vereins. 6: 102–149.
- Hütteroth, W.-D.; Abdulfattah, K. (1977). Historical Geography of Palestine, Transjordan and Southern Syria in the Late 16th Century. Erlanger Geographische Arbeiten, Sonderband 5. Erlangen, Germany: Vorstand der Fränkischen Geographischen Gesellschaft. ISBN 3-920405-41-2.
- Mills, E., ed. (1932). Census of Palestine 1931. Population of Villages, Towns and Administrative Areas. Jerusalem: Government of Palestine.
- Moudjir ed-dyn (1876). Sauvaire (ed.). Histoire de Jérusalem et d'Hébron depuis Abraham jusqu'à la fin du XVe siècle de J.-C. : fragments de la Chronique de Moudjir-ed-dyn.
- Palmer, E.H. (1881). The Survey of Western Palestine: Arabic and English Name Lists Collected During the Survey by Lieutenants Conder and Kitchener, R. E. Transliterated and Explained by E.H. Palmer. Committee of the Palestine Exploration Fund.
- Prawer, J.; Benvenisti, D. (1970). Palestine under the Crusaders. In: Amiran, D.H.K. et al., eds. Atlas of Israel. Vol. IX: 10. Jerusalem.
- Robinson, E.; Smith, E. (1841). Biblical Researches in Palestine, Mount Sinai and Arabia Petraea: A Journal of Travels in the year 1838. Vol. 3. Boston: Crocker & Brewster.
- Röhricht, R. (1887). "Studien zur mittelalterlichen Geographie und Topographie Syriens". Zeitschrift des Deutschen Palästina-Vereins. 10: 195–344.
- Schick, C. (1896). "Zur Einwohnerzahl des Bezirks Jerusalem". Zeitschrift des Deutschen Palästina-Vereins. 19: 120–127.
- Sharon, M. (1997). Corpus Inscriptionum Arabicarum Palaestinae, A. Vol. 1. Brill. ISBN 90-04-10833-5.
- Singer, A. (1994). Palestinian Peasants and Ottoman Officials: Rural Administration Around Sixteenth-Century Jerusalem. Cambridge University Press. ISBN 0-521-47679-8.
- Socin, A. (1879). "Alphabetisches Verzeichniss von Ortschaften des Paschalik Jerusalem". Zeitschrift des Deutschen Palästina-Vereins. 2: 135–163.
- Tamārī, S. (2008). Mountain Against the Sea: Essays on Palestinian Society and Culture. University of California Press. ISBN 978-0-520-25129-8.
- Toledano, E. (1984). "The Sanjaq of Jerusalem in the Sixteenth Century: Aspects of Topography and Population". Archivum Ottomanicum. 9: 279–319. Archived from the original on 5 March 2016.
