= Tel Hadid =

Archaeological site in Israel

- Al-Haditha
- Shown in Israel
- 31°57′49″N 34°57′06″E
- Periods: Intermediate Bronze Age Late Bronze Age; Iron Age II; Persian period Hellenistic period Roman period Byzantine period Early Islamic period Ottoman period Mandatory period
- Location: Ben Shemen Forest, Central District, Israel
- Region: Southwestern Samaria

Tel Hadid is an archaeological site in Israel.

== Name and identification ==
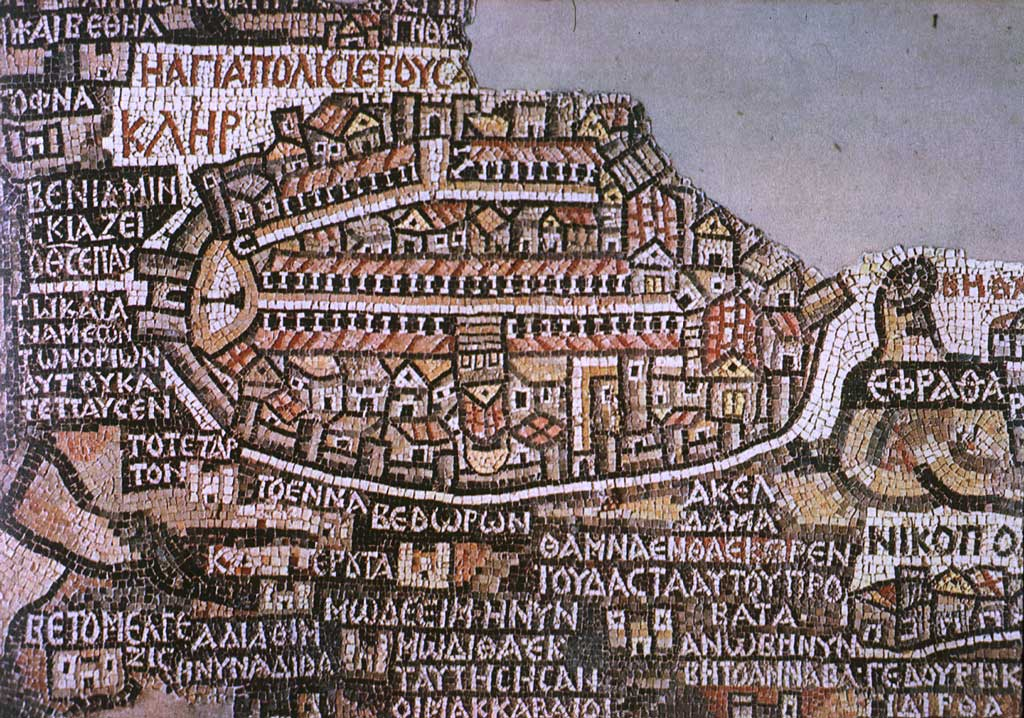
Madaba Map (detail), showing Jerusalem and, in the bottom left, the village of Adiatha

The name Hadid (Hebrew: חָדִיד) is first attested in the Hebrew Bible, in the books of Ezra and Nehemiah. It is also mentioned as Adida (Ancient Greek: ᾿Αδιδὰ or Άδδιδά) and Aditha (Ancient Greek: Aδιθα) in various Greek sources, including 1 Maccabees, Josephus' The Jewish War. During early scholarship, led by Church Fathers such as in Eusebius' Onomasticon, identified the place with Adithaim, mentioned in the Book of Joshua. Similarly, the Madaba Map, features a village northwest of Jerusalem with the caption Adiathim that is now Aditha. But Adithaim is to be sought in the Judean Shephelah, and it seems that the similarity in the sounds of the toponym was behind this confusion. A different identification of Haditha was suggested centuries later and subsequently gained acceptance in scholarship. The 13th century Jewish scholar Ishtori Haparchi wrote that the village of Haditha (Hebrew: חדתא), located on top of a round hill two hours walk east of Lydda, is the place of Biblical Hadid. The Arabic version of the name is al-Haditha (Arabic: الحديثة, "the new").

== Location and landscape ==
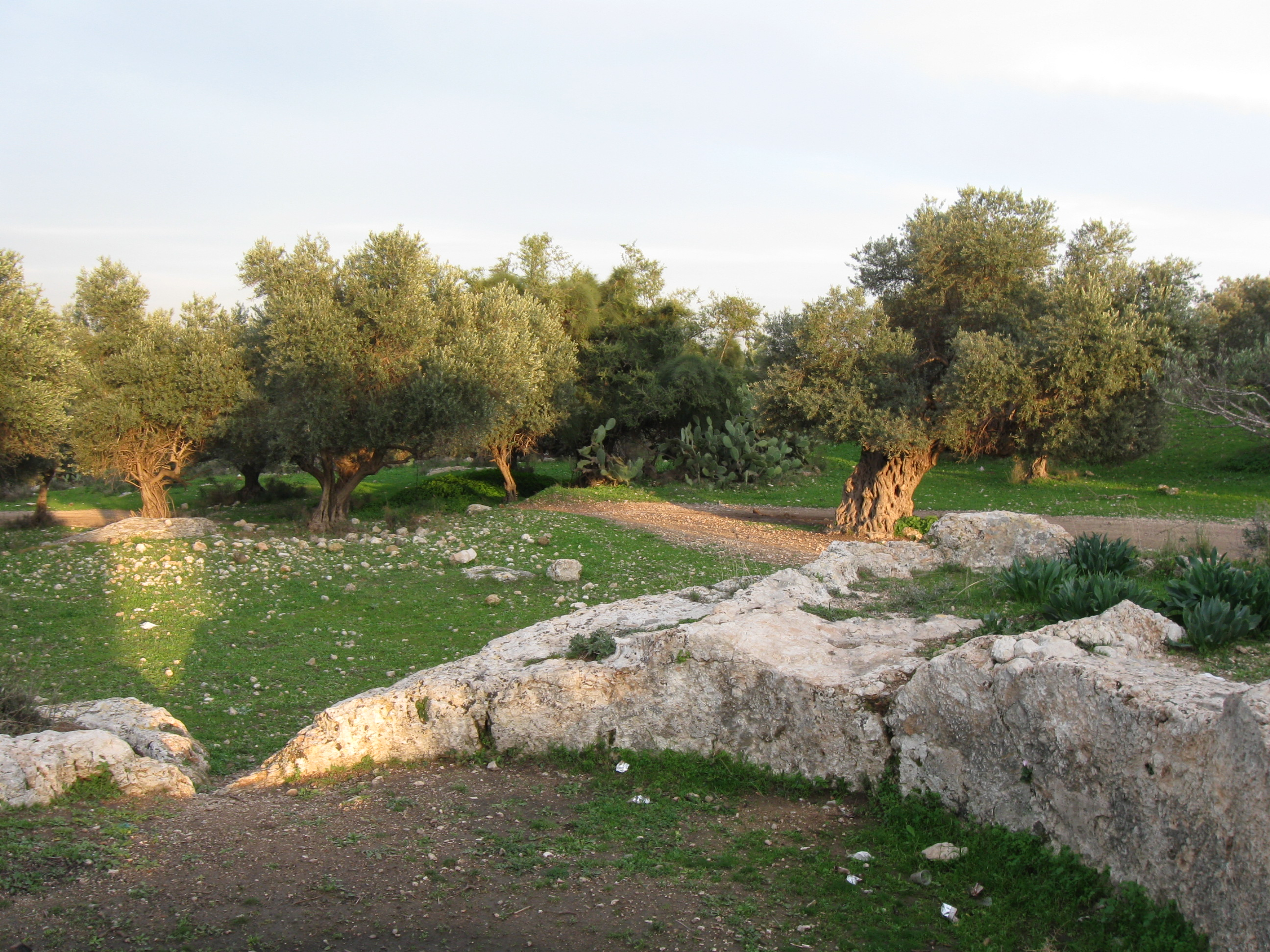
Byzantine-period wine press and olive orchard on the lower terrace of Tel Hadid

Tel Hadid is located on an isolated hill, 147 metres (482 ft) above sea level south of a tributary of Naḥal Ayalon. It overlooks the central coastal plain of Israel, the Lydda Valley and the Tel Aviv metropolitan area.

The local rock in this area is chalk covered by Nari (hard limestone) crust. Accelerated processes of chalk decay created many natural caves and fallen debris, commonly found in various locations at the site. Most of Tel Hadid is currently covered by olive plantations, which had been cultivated by the inhabitants of village al-Haditha, and by pine trees, which were planted by the Jewish National Fund. Remains of houses and the cemetery of al-Haditha are still noticeable on the ground.

== History and archaeology ==
=== Intermediate Bronze Age ===
The earliest trace of human occupation at Tel Hadid is dated to the Intermediate Bronze Age (2500 – 1950 BCE) and includes several broken potsherds and an elliptical silo for storing grains, found north of the mound. This is a sign of early settlement at the site by dwellers who practiced agriculture. The appearance of human activity in Tel Hadid at the intermediate period is followed by the abandoment of prominent sites in its vicinity, including Tel Dalit, Tel Burnat and Tel Bareket, inhabited during the Early Bronze Age II-III periods (2800–1950 BCE).

=== Late Bronze Age ===
There is a gap in evidence for human settlement throughout most of the 2nd millennium BCE. A water cistern with pottery vessels dating to the 12th century BCE (Late Bronze Age) was excavated at the site, and contained skeletal remains of at least 20 individuals. These represent a general population: both sexes, aged between infancy and over 50. The vessels included bowls, kraters, cooking pots, jugs and lamps. These remains were found thrown in a cistern, probably by later inhabitants who had cleared the contents of a cemetery that existed here. The vessels represent local Canaanite ceramic traditions often used as grave goods, with the exception of one vessel exhibiting a Cypriot style. It was further suggested that Late Bronze Tel Hadid was part of a chain of minor settlements located along the Via Maris route, including Tel Malot, Tel Shalaf, Tell Ras Abu Hamid and Tel Afek.

=== Iron Age ===
The first clear sings of settlement are dated to the Iron Age II, under the Kingdom of Israel and, after its downfall, under the Assyrian Empire.

==== Iron IIA ====
The main finding from the Iron IIA is a cultic refuse pit containing several pottery vessels, including chalices, clay figurines and Judean pillar figure. The assemblage feature types with parallels across the coastal plain, from Tell Qasile and Tel Aphek in the north to Tel Batash and Tel Beit Shemesh in the south. These are dated c. 9th century BCE.

==== Iron IIB ====
Few remains found on the top and around of the mound indicate a settlement dated to the Iron IIB.

==== Iron IIC ====
Salvage excavations on the lower hill, north of the mound, have revealed a cluster of domestic units, with two well-preserved structures, dated to the late 8th to 7th century BCE, the time of Assyrian rule, as well as 28 olive presses and some winepresses.

Within those structures two clay tablets written in Cuneiform, attesting to economic transactions which took place in 698 and 664 BCE. The names appearing on these tablets are Mesopotamian, Aramean and local. This is explained by the Assyrian policy of forced displacement, as attested in Assyrian sources and the Biblical text (2 Kings 17:1, 24). Similar finds were uncovered in nearby Gezer, which was an important Israelite town, which was destroyed and rebuilt by the Assyrians.

=== Persian period ===
Hadid is first mentioned in the books of Ezra and Nehemiah among the towns settled by those returning from the Babylonian exile.

=== Hellenistic period ===
After the conquests of Alexander the Great in 332 BCE, the region, then known as Coele-Syria, came under Hellenistic period rule. It was ruled by the Seleucid dynasty until the 2nd century BCE and the rise of the Jewish Hasmonean dynasty, which assumed independence in 140s BCE. According to the 1 Maccabees, Hadid (Greek: Αδιδα) was fortified by Simon Thassi during the war with Seleucid usurper Diodotus Tryphon. The battle between those armies took place in the valley it overlooks.

Archaeological finds from this period include an earthen platform built on the upper mound an fortification walls. The ceramic vessels found in these contexts are from the first half of the 1st century BCE, the final years of Hasmonean rule. While this stands in contrast to the description in 1 Maccabees, it is possible due to the limited extent of the excavations that the findings represent later renovations of the fortifications.

=== Roman period ===
The strategic importance of Hadid was maintained for generations. According to Josephus, Vespasian, who led the legions against the Jewish Revolt, decided to block the ways leading to Jerusalem and chose to fortify Hadid (Άδδιδά). Lastly, a rabbinical tradition claims that Hadid was among the towns fortified during the days of Joshua.

=== Byzantine and Early Islamic periods ===
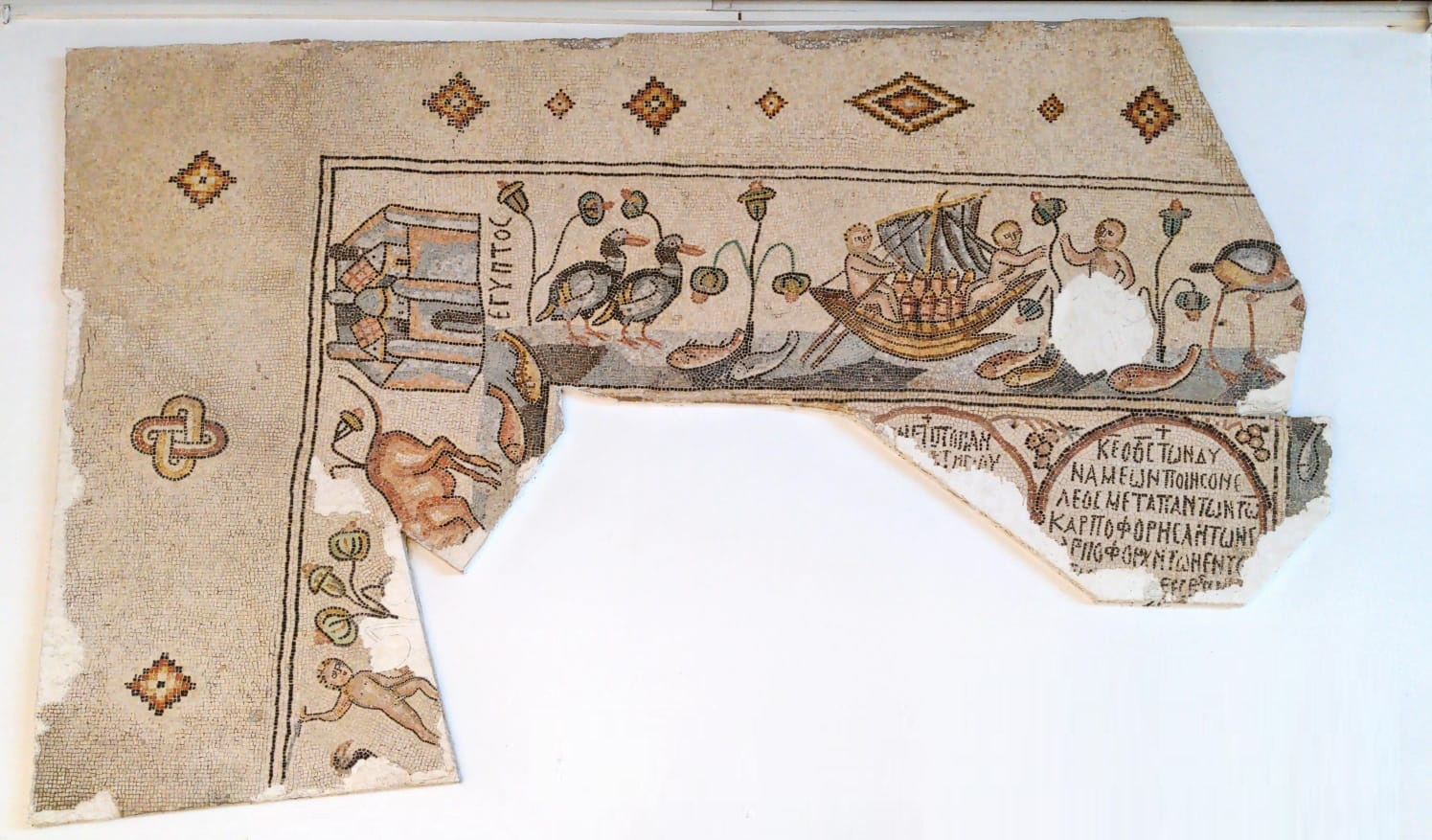
The Haditha Mosaic Pavement, excavated by Jacob Ory in 1940

During the Byzantine period (4th century – 640 CE), the region experienced demographic growth and economic prosperity, alongside significant cultural transformations, particularly the Christianization of the population. At that time, Aditha was part of the rural hinterland of Diospolis (Lod), within the Byzantine province of Palaestina Prima. Numerous rock-cut wine and olive presses indicate that it was an agricultural settlement. West of the upper mound lies the largest wine production complex at the site, which includes a 7-meter-wide treading floor hewn into the bedrock and paved with white mosaic.

Evidence of a Christian presence in Aditha comes from a mosaic floor belonging to a small church or chapel, discovered in August 1940 by A. Khamis and the village mukhtar, Sa'id Yusuf of Al-Haditha, near the village threshing floors. The structure was excavated in December 1940 by Jacob Ory of the British Mandatory Department of Antiquities. The floor was part of a room measuring 5.25 × 4.25 meters, built directly on bedrock, with only one wall preserved to a height of 10 cm. The mosaic was removed and stored in the department's warehouses; it is now housed at the Israeli National Maritime Museum in Haifa.

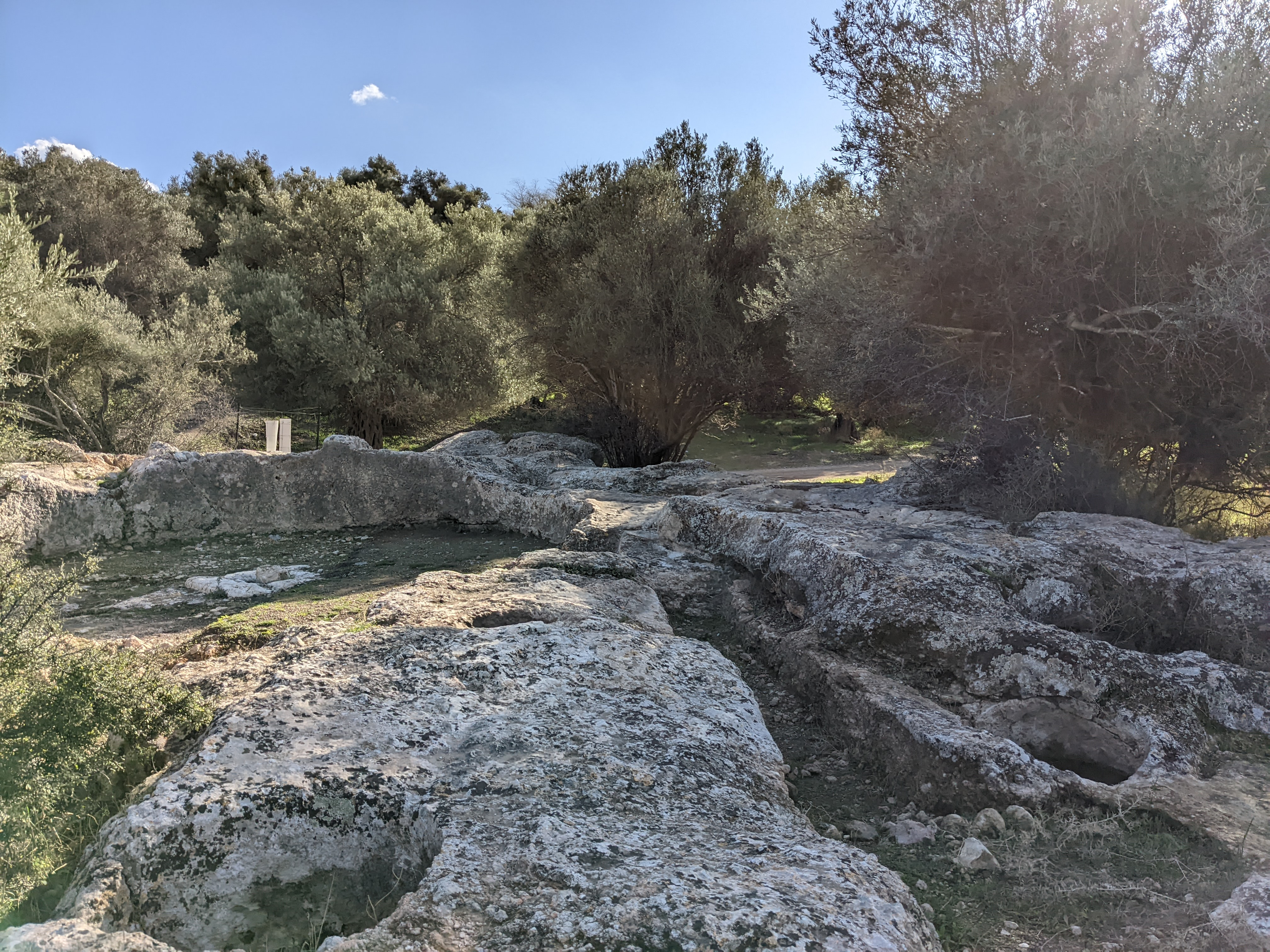
A rock hewn winepress at Tel Hadid's environs.

The mosaic depicts a Nilotic scene, including the Nile River, nude figures, a sailing boat laden with wine jars, birds, fish, lotus flowers, and a depiction of a city labeled "Egypt" in Greek. Two fragmentary Greek inscriptions with small crosses above them were also preserved. The left inscription reads: "The whole [work] of this praying place was made [in the time of...]", while the right inscription says: "Lord God of Hosts, save those who have contributed and who contribute in this place... priest." Although the section that would have contained the date did not survive, Michael Avi-Yonah, who published Ory's findings, dated the mosaic to the second half of the 6th century CE.

Additional evidence of Christian activity at Aditha includes dozens of arcosolia tombs excavated and surveyed around the upper mound and its surroundings. These tombs contained pottery vessels dated to the 4th–7th centuries CE, along with glass vessels and jewelry, including a small silver Christian cross. Some of the glass vessels have been dated to the 8th century CE, during the Umayyad rule in Jund Filastin. Aditha appears to have persisted in the years after the Muslim conquest of the Levant, and was likely abandoned in the broader context of Lod’s decline and the rise of Ramla in 705 CE.

=== Arab village in the Ottoman and British Mandatory periods ===
In 1944 the village of al-Haditha had 760 inhabitants. It was captured by Israeli forces on July 12, 1948, during Operation Danny, following the conquest of Lydda and Ramle, and subsequently depopulated of its residents.

== Archaeological explorations at the site ==
A major salvage excavation project took place in 1995–1997, during which extensive remains were unearthed across a lower terrace to the north of the high mound.

A new research project was launched in 2018, under the auspice of Tel Aviv University and the New Orleans Baptist Theological Seminary.

== See also ==
- Artabba
- Beth-zur
- Gezer
