= Nabali olive =

Type of olive from the Middle East

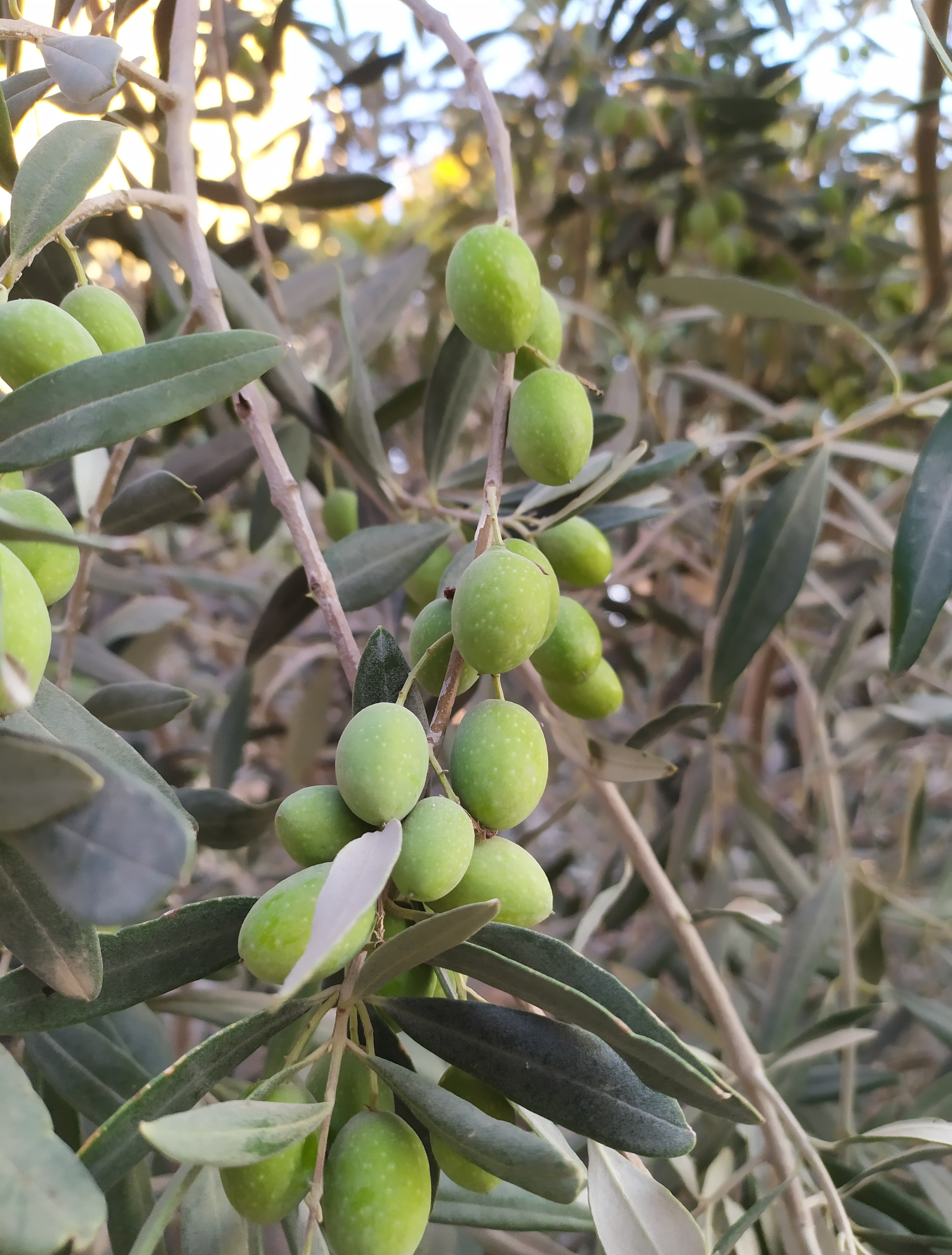

Olive (Olea europaea)
- Color of the ripe fruit: Green
- Origin: Palestine
- Use: Oil and table
- Oil content: High

The Nabali olive is one of the distinguished varieties of olives cultivated in Palestine and the Levant. It is considered one of the oldest and most renowned types, widely spread across Palestinian and Jordanian lands.

== Etymology ==
The name Nabali is derived from Bayt Nabala (Arabic: بيت نبالا); a depopulated Arab-Palestinian town near Lydda.

The name is attested in English as early as 1910 in a bulletin by the United States Bureau of Plant Industry, which noted that several varieties of olives are cultivated near Haifa and Lydda all called Nabali.

== Distribution ==
It has long been widely cultivated in the West Bank, Jordan, Israel, Syria, and Lebanon. The name "Nabali" reflects its geographic and cultural heritage.

== Types of Nabali Olive ==
- Improved Nabali (Nabali Mohassan):

Developed to enhance yield and withstand climatic conditions, this variety produces abundant crops and contains a high oil content.

- Local Nabali (Nabali Baladi):

This is the traditional type of Nabali olive, also known in some areas as "Roman Olive." The tree is large and long-lived, typically growing in mountainous regions.

== Characteristics and Uses ==
- The Nabali olive is known for its dual-purpose use—it can be harvested either for olive oil production or as a table olive.
- It is picked in September for use as green table olives, and in November, once fully ripe, for olive oil extraction.
- The oil content in the Nabali olive is around 23%.
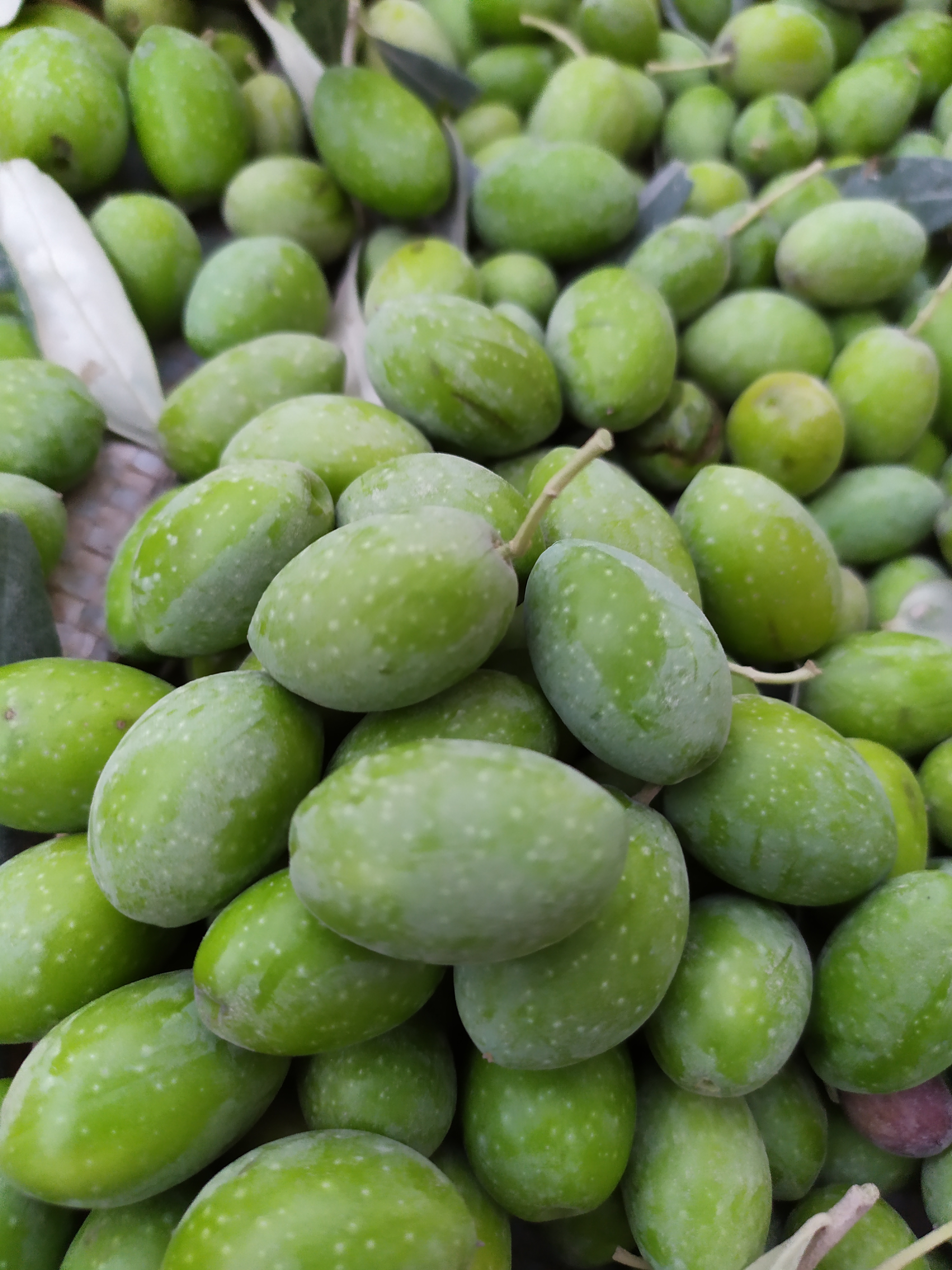
- Green Local Nabali Olives Prepared for Table Use and Pickling
  The tree is drought-resistant and capable of growing in harsh environments.

== See also ==
- List of olive cultivars
- Olive cultivation in Palestine
- Olive
