= Al-Haditha, Ramle =

Al-Haditha الحديثة
- Etymology: "new"
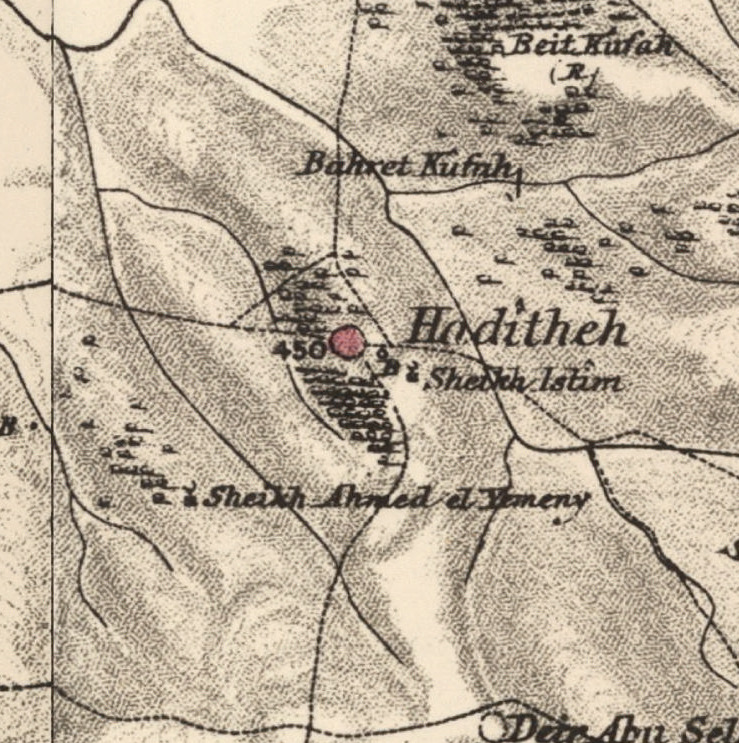
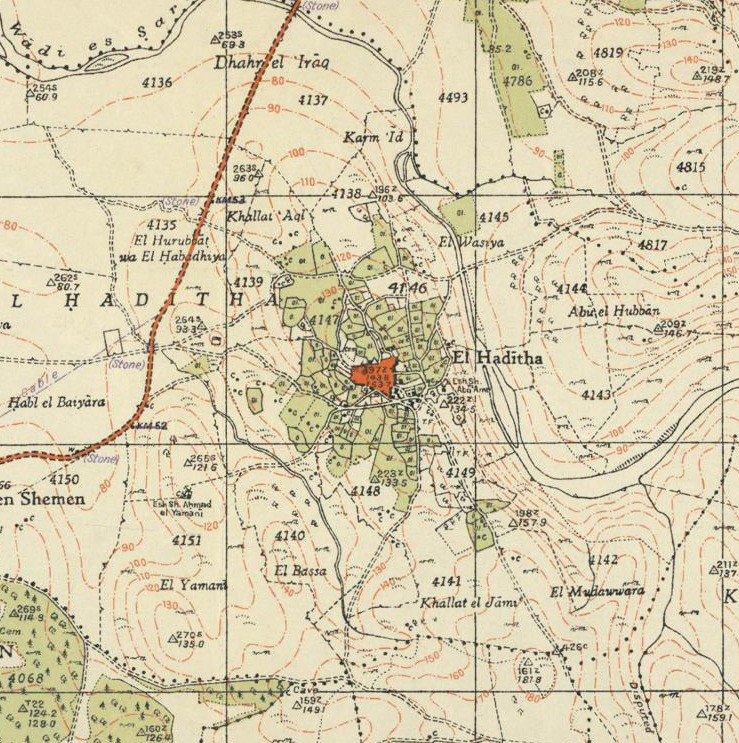
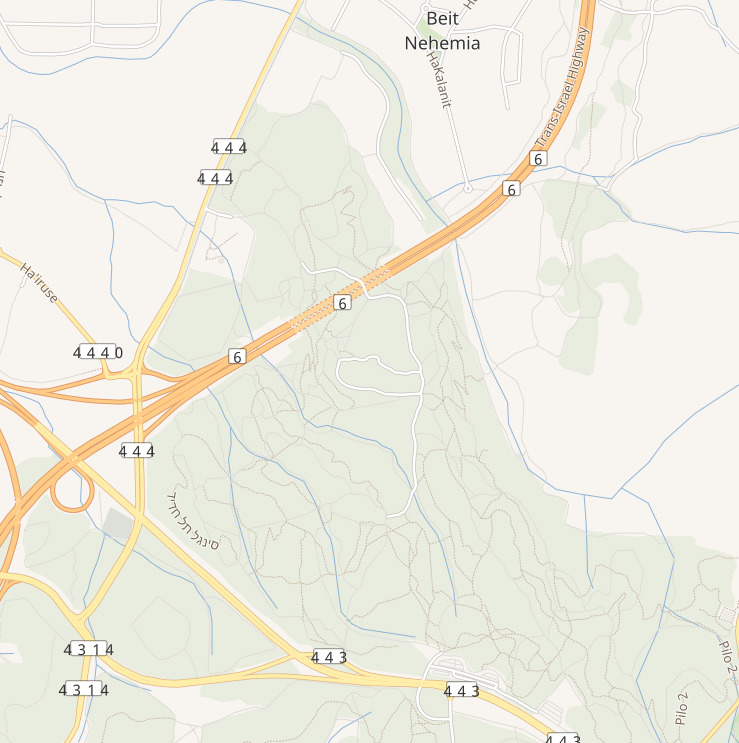
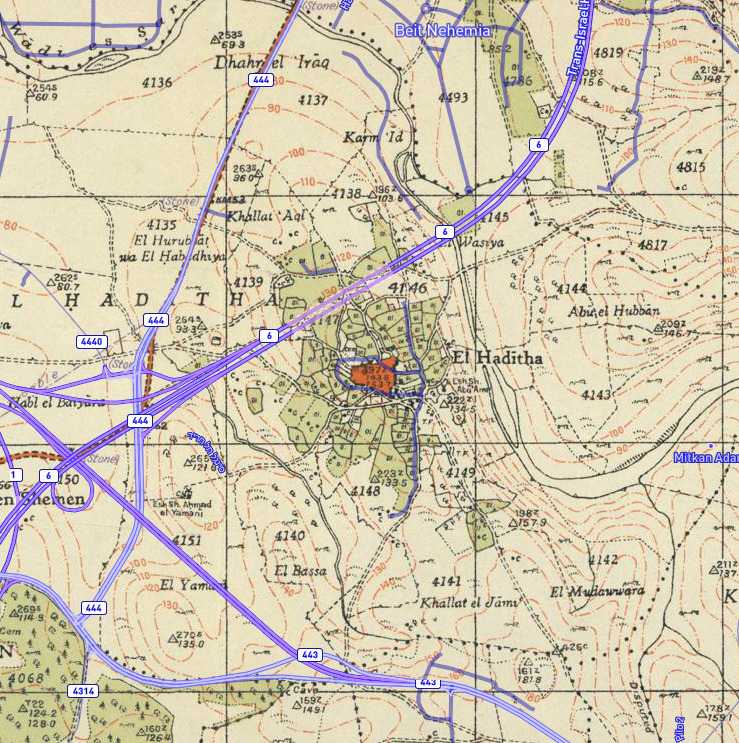
- 1870s map 1940s map modern map 1940s with modern overlay map A series of historical maps of the area around Al-Haditha, Ramle (click the buttons)

- Location within Mandatory Palestine
- Coordinates: 31°57′48″N 34°57′07″E
- Palestine grid: 145/152
- Geopolitical entity: Mandatory Palestine
- Subdistrict: Ramle
- Date of depopulation: July 12, 1948

Population (1945)
  - Total: 760
- Cause(s) of depopulation: Military assault by Yishuv forces
- Current Localities: Hadid

Al-Haditha was a Palestinian village in the Ramle Subdistrict. It was located 8 km northeast of Ramla, on the bank of Wadi al-Natuf. The site, now known as Tel Hadid, has yielded significant archaeological remains from many periods. Al-Haditha was depopulated during the 1948 Arab-Israeli War on July 12, 1948, under the first stage of Operation Dani.

== Etymology ==
Al-Haditha (Arabic: 'New') is the Arabic renditions of Hebrew Hadid, mentioned in the Book of Ezra (II, 33) and later in the Mishna as a city of Judea fortified by Joshua. Hadid was called 'Adida (Άδασά ) in the Book of Maccabees, while Eusebius referred to it as Adatha or Aditha. The Greek transcription masks three different Semitic phonemes. ʽAddāsi may be a survival of either Ḥdšh or ʽdšh (nomen unitatis of ʽdšym “lentils”) if the gemination of the -d- and the legthening of -a- are secondary. The disappearance of the laryngeals might have been caused by the Roman prohibition of Jewish presence in that area after the Bar-Kochva revolt.

== History ==
Al-Haditha is identified with the site of the biblical village of Hadid.

=== Ottoman era ===
In the 18th or early 19th centuries, a feud broke between Bayt Nabala and al-Haditha as part of the Qays and Yaman conflicts in the area.

In 1870, Victor Guérin visited and "at a quarter of an hour's distance south-east of Haditheh, [he] found several ancient tombs cut in the rock. The village of Haditheh he found to be on the site of an ancient town. Cisterns, a birket, tombs, and rock-cut caves, with cut stones scattered about, are all that remain."

An official Ottoman village list of about 1870 showed that "El Hadite" had 28 houses and a population of 145, though the population count included only men.

In 1882 the PEF's Survey of Western Palestine (SWP) described the village as "a moderate-sized village on a terraced Tell at the mouth of a valley at the foot of the hills, with a well on the east. There are remains of a considerable town round it, tombs and quarries exist; and the mound on which the village stands is covered with pottery."

=== British Mandate era ===
In a census conducted in 1922 by the British Mandate authorities, Hadata had a population of 415 Muslims, increasing in the 1931 census to 520, still all Muslims, in a total of 119 houses. In the 1945 statistics, the village had a population of 760 Muslims, with a total of 7,110 dunums of land. A total of 10 dunams of village land were used for citrus and bananas, 4,419 dunums were used for cereals, 246 dunums were irrigated or used for plantations, while 16 dunams were built–up, or urban, land.

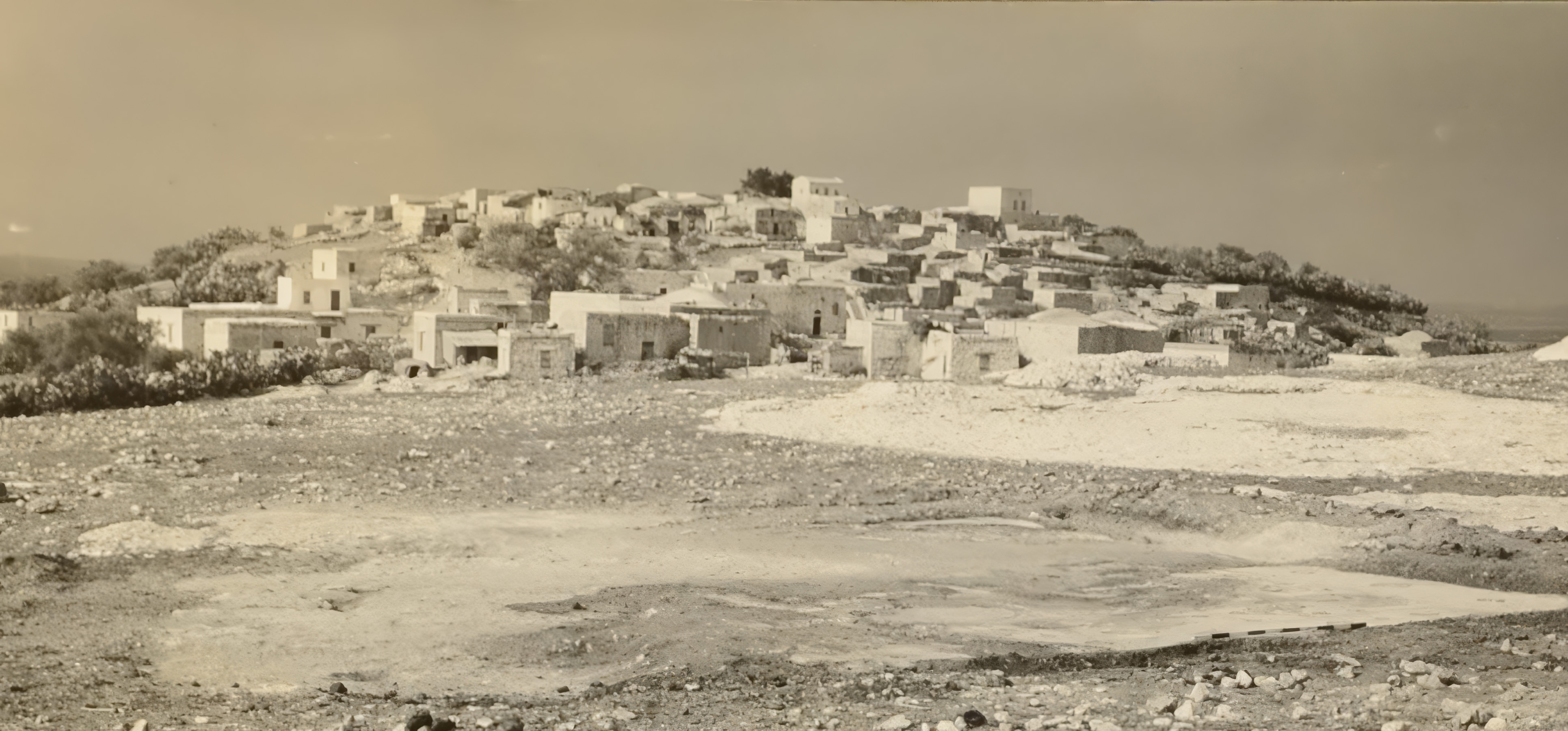
Al-Haditha 1940, looking northwest

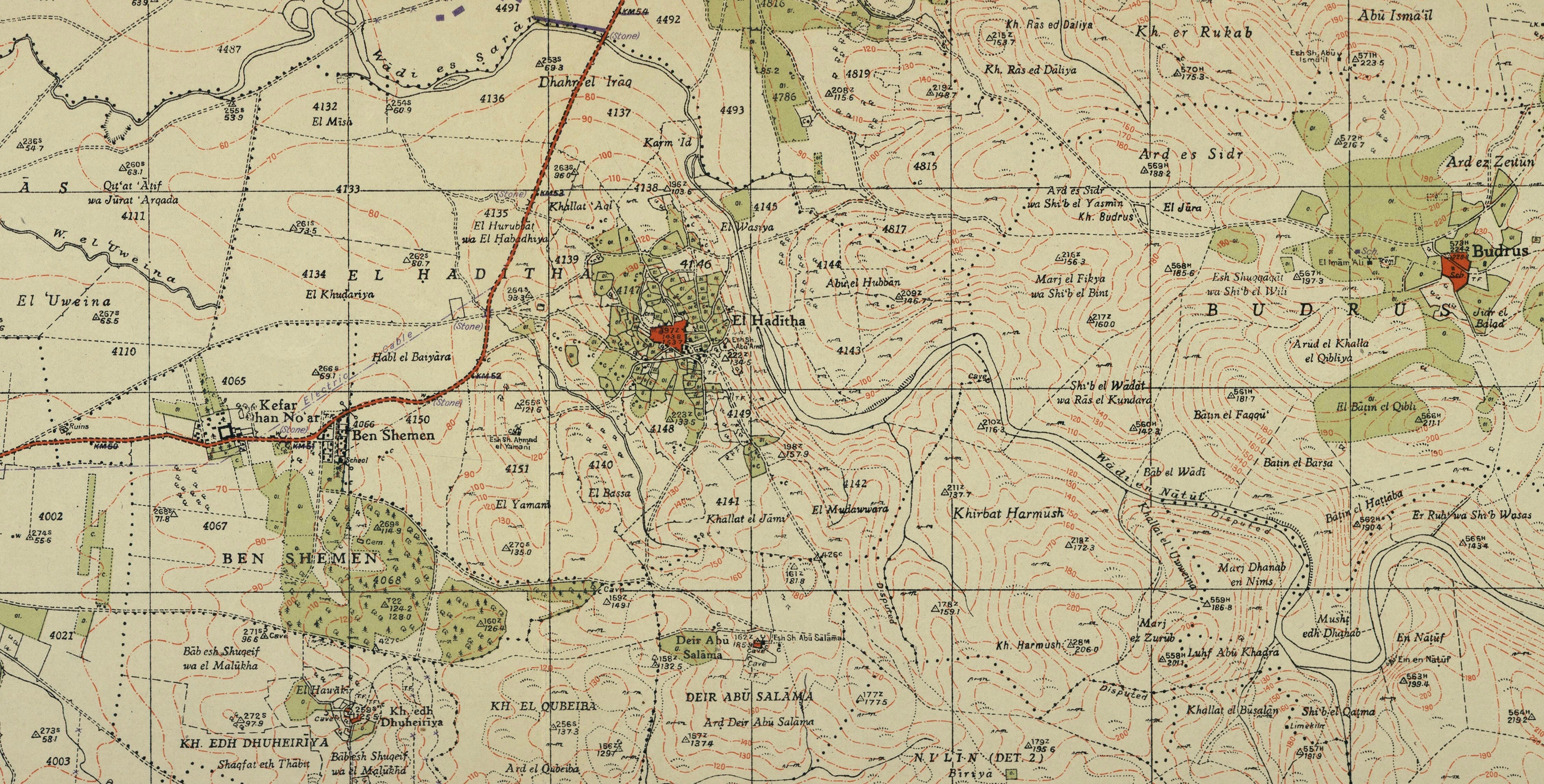
Al-Haditha 1942 1:20,000

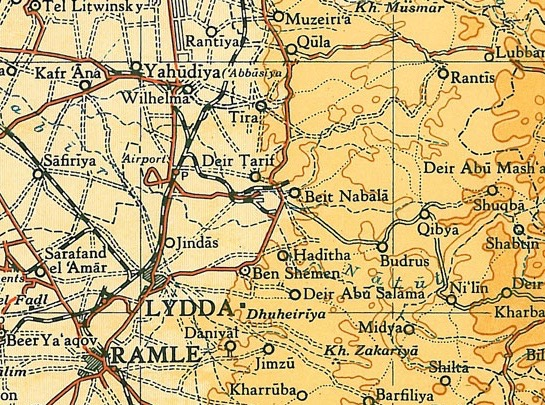
Al-Haditha 1945 1:250,000

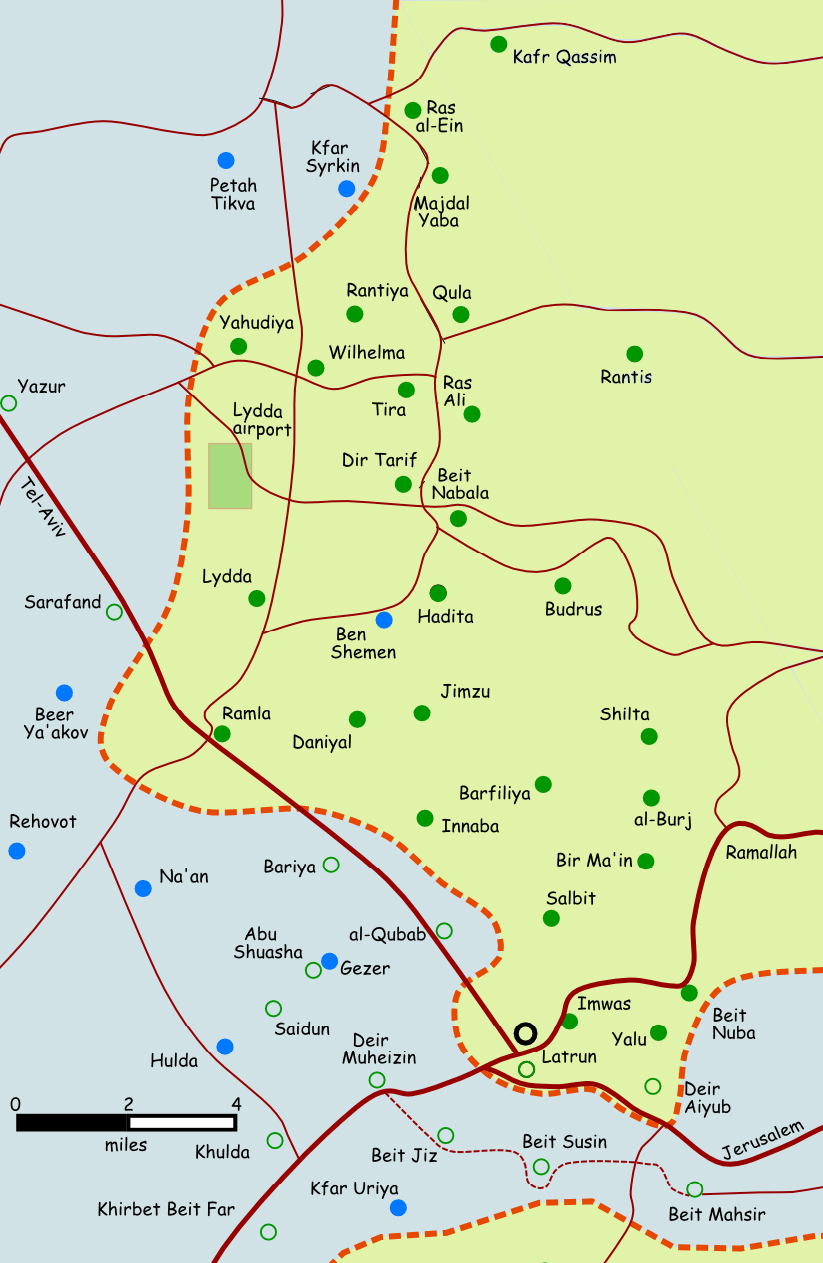
Depopulated villages in the Ramle Subdistrict

=== 1948, aftermath ===
Early in 1948, the Mukhtar of Al-Haditha met to negotiate a non–belligerent agreement with the neighbouring Ben Shemen. However, Al-Haditha was depopulated during the 1948 Arab-Israeli War on July 12, 1948, under the first stage of Operation Dani.

In September, 1948, Ben-Gurion asked the ministerial committee for permission to destroy 14 villages, one of which was Al-Haditha. Part of the village was destroyed in 1948, and the remainder in 1967.

In 1992 the village site was described: "The stone and concrete rubble of destroyed houses is visible on the site. Only one house remains; it is sealed and deserted. It has a gabled, tiled roof, and a sign ('BROADWAY 80') is glued to one of its walls. There are also clusters of trees on the site, including Christ's–thorn, olive and eucalyptus trees. The old village road remains and has been enlarged. The surrounding land is cultivated."

Since 2022, a project of Palestinians and Israelis led by Yoav Alon of Tel-Aviv University has investigated the Palestinian village from its founding during the Ottoman period to its depopulation in 1948, using a combination of archaeology, oral testimony and historical records. The project is only the second Israeli archaeological investigation of a Palestinian village from the modern era.

== Bibliography ==
- Barron, J.B., ed. (1923). Palestine: Report and General Abstracts of the Census of 1922. Government of Palestine.
- Conder, C.R.; Kitchener, H.H. (1882). The Survey of Western Palestine: Memoirs of the Topography, Orography, Hydrography, and Archaeology. Vol. 2. London: Committee of the Palestine Exploration Fund.
- Department of Statistics (1945). Village Statistics, April, 1945. Government of Palestine.
- Guérin, V. (1875). Description Géographique Historique et Archéologique de la Palestine (in French). Vol. 2: Samarie, pt. 2. Paris: L'Imprimerie Nationale.
- Hadawi, S. (1970). Village Statistics of 1945: A Classification of Land and Area ownership in Palestine. Palestine Liberation Organization Research Center. Archived from the original on 2018-12-08.
- Hartmann, M. (1883). "Die Ortschaftenliste des Liwa Jerusalem in dem türkischen Staatskalender für Syrien auf das Jahr 1288 der Flucht (1871)". Zeitschrift des Deutschen Palästina-Vereins. 6: 102–149.
- Khalidi, W. (1992). All That Remains: The Palestinian Villages Occupied and Depopulated by Israel in 1948. Washington D.C.: Institute for Palestine Studies. ISBN 0-88728-224-5.
- Mills, E., ed. (1932). Census of Palestine 1931. Population of Villages, Towns and Administrative Areas. Jerusalem: Government of Palestine.
- Morris, B. (2004). The Birth of the Palestinian Refugee Problem Revisited. Cambridge University Press. ISBN 0-521-00967-7.
- Neubauer, A. (1868). La géographie du Talmud : mémoire couronné par l'Académie des inscriptions et belles-lettres (in French). Paris: Lévy.
- Palmer, E.H. (1881). The Survey of Western Palestine: Arabic and English Name Lists Collected During the Survey by Lieutenants Conder and Kitchener, R. E. Transliterated and Explained by E.H. Palmer. Committee of the Palestine Exploration Fund.
- Socin, A. (1879). "Alphabetisches Verzeichniss von Ortschaften des Paschalik Jerusalem". Zeitschrift des Deutschen Palästina-Vereins. 2: 135–163.
