= Beit Nehemia =

Moshav in central Israel

Beit Nehemia: בֵּית נְחֶמְיָה (Hebrew)
- Etymology: House of Nehemiah
- Location within Central Israel Location within Israel
- Coordinates: 31°58′38″N 34°57′17″E
- Country: Israel
- District: Central
- Subdistrict: Ramla
- Council: Hevel Modi'in
- Affiliation: HaOved HaTzioni
- Founded: 1950
- Founder: Persian Jewish Refugees
- Population (2024): 1,073

Beit Nehemia (Hebrew: בֵּית נְחֶמְיָה, lit. 'House of Nehemiah') is a moshav in central Israel. Located near Shoham, it falls under the jurisdiction of Hevel Modi'in Regional Council. In 2024 it had a population of 1,073.

== History ==
During the 18th and 19th centuries, Beit Nehemia was the site of the Arab village of Beit Nabala. It belonged to the Nahiyeh (sub-district) of Lod that encompassed the area of the present-day city of Modi'in-Maccabim-Re'ut in the south to the present-day city of El'ad in the north, and from the foothills in the east, through the Lod Valley to the outskirts of Jaffa in the west. This area was home to thousands of inhabitants in about 20 villages, who had at their disposal tens of thousands of hectares of prime agricultural land.

The moshav was established in 1950 on the site of Beit Nabala by Jewish immigrants from Persia. It was named after the biblical prophet Nehemiah, who left Persia for Israel like the modern founders.
