= Mazari an-Nubani =

Palestinian town near Ramallah, West Bank

- Municipality type C

Arabic transcription(s)
  - Arabic: مزارع النوباني
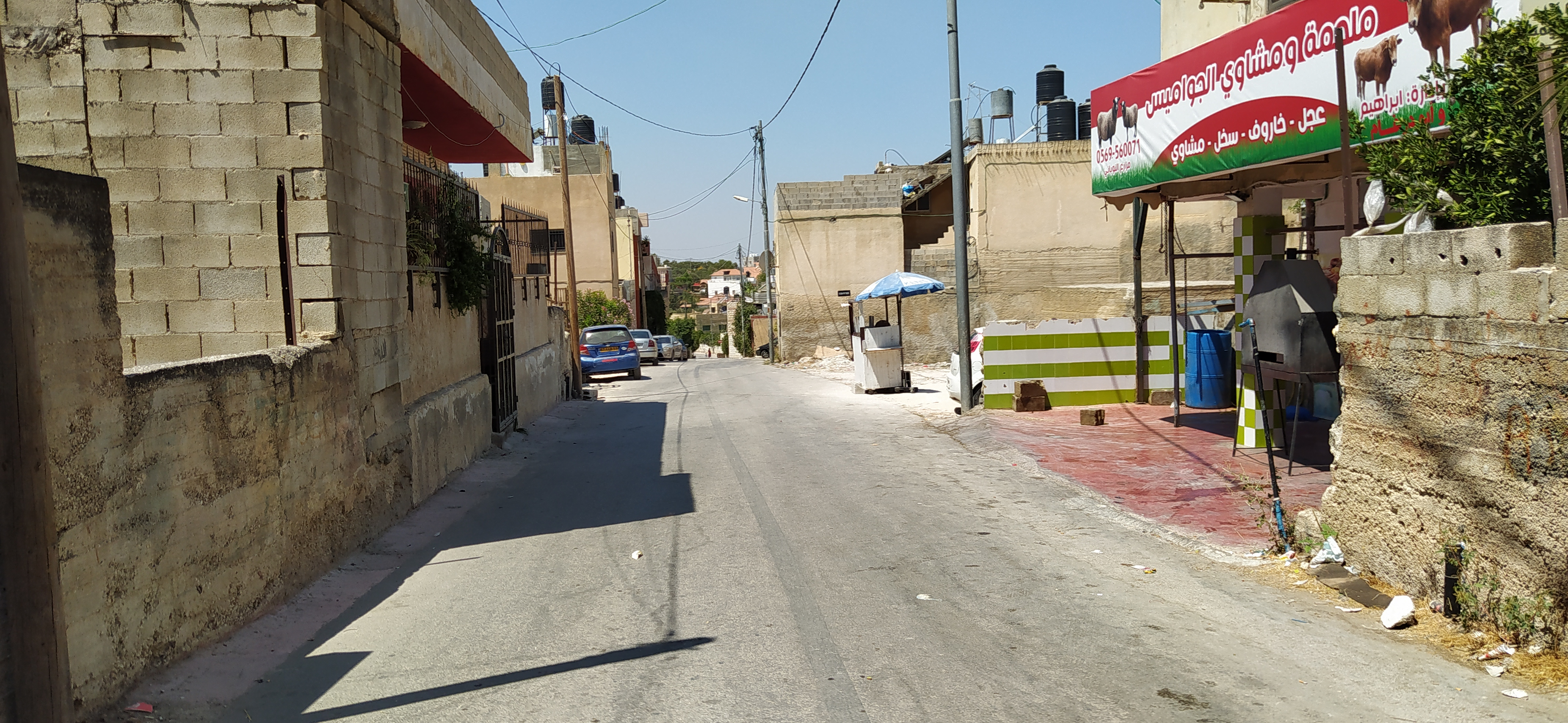
- Mazari an-Nubani

- Location of Mazari an-Nubani within Palestine
- Coordinates: 32°02′58″N 35°09′57″E
- Palestine grid: 165/161
- State: State of Palestine
- Governorate: Ramallah and al-Bireh

Government
  - Type: Municipality

Population (2017)
  - Total: 2,436
- Name meaning: "The sown land",

Mazari an-Nubani (Arabic: مزارع النوباني) is a Palestinian town in the Ramallah and al-Bireh Governorate, located 25 kilometers North of Ramallah in the northern West Bank. According to the Palestinian Central Bureau of Statistics (PCBS), the town had a population of 2,436 inhabitants in 2017.

== History ==
Mazari al-Nubani was by earlier scholars (Röhricht, Prawer and Benvenisti) identified with the Crusader village called Mezera, but newer scholars (Finkelstein et al.) disputes this.

=== Ottoman era ===
In 1596 the village, under the name of Mazra'at al-'Abbas, appeared in the Ottoman tax registers as being in the Nahiya of Quds of the Liwa of Quds. It had a population of 60 households and 21 bachelors, all Muslim. Taxes were paid on wheat, barley, olive trees, vineyards and fruit trees, goats and/or beehives; a total of 6,910 akçe. 1/3 of the revenue went to a Waqf.

In 1838 el-Mezari'a was noted as a Muslim village, part of the Beni Zeid area, located north of Jerusalem.

When Guérin passed by the village in 1870, he estimated it had a population of about 600. An Ottoman village list from about the same year showed Mazari with a population of 560, in 163 houses, though the population count included men only. It was also noted it was located east of Qarawat Bani Zeid.

In 1882, the PEF's Survey of Western Palestine described the village, then called Mezrah, as being of moderate size, on high ground.

In 1896 the population of Mezra‘a was estimated to be about 1,008 persons.

=== British Mandate era ===
In the 1922 census of Palestine conducted by the British Mandate authorities, Mazarie' al-Nubani had a population of 611 Muslims, increasing in the 1931 census to 864 Muslims, in 193 houses.

The 1945 statistics found 1,090 Muslim inhabitants with a total of 9,631 dunam of land. Of this, 7,399 were used for plantations and irrigable land, 445 for cereals, while 59 dunams were classified as built-up areas.

=== Jordanian era ===
In the wake of the 1948 Arab–Israeli War, and after the 1949 Armistice Agreements, Mazari Nubani came under Jordanian rule.

In 1961, the population of Mazari al-Nubani was 1,358.

=== Post 1967 ===
Since the Six-Day War in 1967, Mazari al-Nuban has been under Israeli occupation.

According to the Palestinian Central Bureau of Statistics (PCBS), the town had a population of approximately 2,510 inhabitants in mid-year 2006.

== Folklore ==
The local a-Nubani hamula claims to descend from Abdul Qadir Gilani, a Sufi leader who founded the Qadiri order.

== Bibliography ==
- Barron, J. B., ed. (1923). Palestine: Report and General Abstracts of the Census of 1922. Government of Palestine.
- Conder, C.R.; Kitchener, H.H. (1882). The Survey of Western Palestine: Memoirs of the Topography, Orography, Hydrography, and Archaeology. Vol. 2. London: Committee of the Palestine Exploration Fund.
- Dauphin, C. (1998). La Palestine byzantine, Peuplement et Populations. BAR International Series 726 (in French). Vol. III : Catalogue. Oxford: Archeopress. ISBN 0-860549-05-4.
- Finkelstein, I.; Lederman, Zvi, eds. (1997). Highlands of many cultures. Tel Aviv: Institute of Archaeology of Tel Aviv University Publications Section. ISBN 965-440-007-3.
- Government of Jordan, Department of Statistics (1964). First Census of Population and Housing. Volume I: Final Tables; General Characteristics of the Population (PDF).
- Government of Palestine, Department of Statistics (1945). Village Statistics, April, 1945.
- Guérin, V. (1875). Description Géographique Historique et Archéologique de la Palestine (in French). Vol. 2: Samarie, pt. 2. Paris: L'Imprimerie Nationale.
- Hadawi, S. (1970). Village Statistics of 1945: A Classification of Land and Area ownership in Palestine. Palestine Liberation Organization Research Centre.
- Hartmann, M. (1883). "Die Ortschaftenliste des Liwa Jerusalem in dem türkischen Staatskalender für Syrien auf das Jahr 1288 der Flucht (1871)". Zeitschrift des Deutschen Palästina-Vereins. 6: 102–149.
- Hütteroth, W.-D.; Abdulfattah, K. (1977). Historical Geography of Palestine, Transjordan and Southern Syria in the Late 16th Century. Erlanger Geographische Arbeiten, Sonderband 5. Erlangen, Germany: Vorstand der Fränkischen Geographischen Gesellschaft. ISBN 3-920405-41-2.
- Mills, E., ed. (1932). Census of Palestine 1931. Population of Villages, Towns and Administrative Areas. Jerusalem: Government of Palestine.
- Moudjir ed-dyn (1876). Sauvaire (ed.). Histoire de Jérusalem et d'Hébron depuis Abraham jusqu'à la fin du XVe siècle de J.-C. : fragments de la Chronique de Moudjir-ed-dyn.
- Palmer, E.H. (1881). The Survey of Western Palestine: Arabic and English Name Lists Collected During the Survey by Lieutenants Conder and Kitchener, R. E. Transliterated and Explained by E.H. Palmer. Committee of the Palestine Exploration Fund.
- Prawer, J.; Benvenisti, D. (1970). Palestine under the Crusaders. In: Amiran, D.H.K. et al., eds. Atlas of Israel. Vol. IX: 10. Jerusalem.
- Robinson, E.; Smith, E. (1841). Biblical Researches in Palestine, Mount Sinai and Arabia Petraea: A Journal of Travels in the year 1838. Vol. 3. Boston: Crocker & Brewster.
- Röhricht, R. (1887). "Studien zur mittelalterlichen Geographie und Topographie Syriens". Zeitschrift des Deutschen Palästina-Vereins. 10: 195–344.
- Schick, C. (1896). "Zur Einwohnerzahl des Bezirks Jerusalem". Zeitschrift des Deutschen Palästina-Vereins. 19: 120–127.
- Singer, A. (1994). Palestinian Peasants and Ottoman Officials: Rural Administration Around Sixteenth-Century Jerusalem. Cambridge University Press. ISBN 0-521-47679-8.
- Socin, A. (1879). "Alphabetisches Verzeichniss von Ortschaften des Paschalik Jerusalem". Zeitschrift des Deutschen Palästina-Vereins. 2: 135–163.
- Tamārī, S. (2008). Mountain Against the Sea: Essays on Palestinian Society and Culture. University of California Press. ISBN 978-0-520-25129-8.
- Toledano, E. (1984). "The Sanjaq of Jerusalem in the Sixteenth Century: Aspects of Topography and Population". Archivum Ottomanicum. 9: 279–319. Archived from the original on 2016-03-05.
