= Giv'at Ko'ah =

Moshav in central Israel

Giv'at Ko'ah: גִּבְעַת כֹּ״חַ (Hebrew)
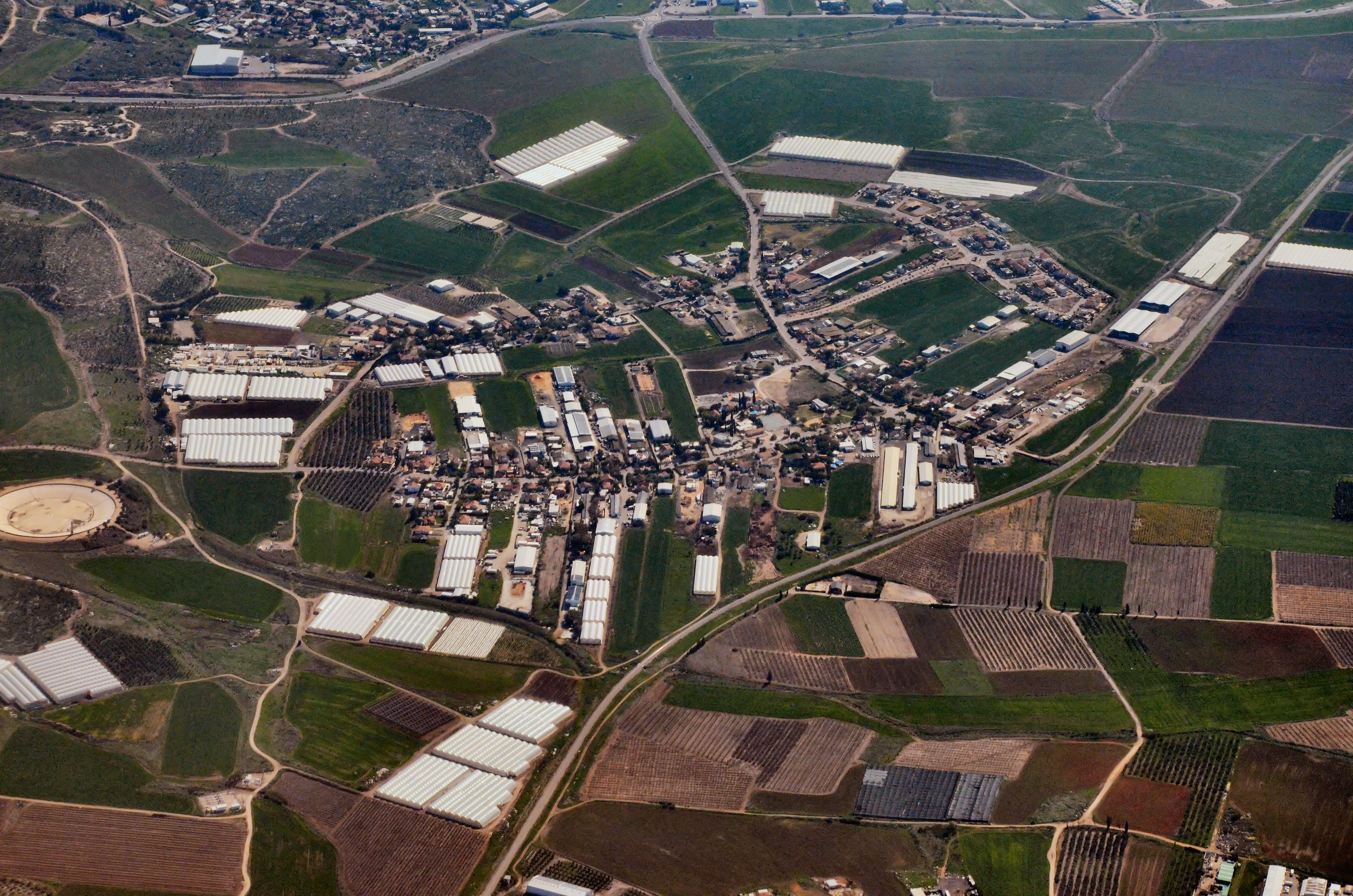

- Location within Central Israel
- Coordinates: 32°1′48″N 34°56′10″E
- Grid position: 144/159 PAL
- Country: Israel
- District: Central
- Subdistrict: Petah Tikva
- Council: Hevel Modi'in
- Affiliation: Moshavim Movement
- Founded: 1950
- Founder: Yemenite immigrants
- Population (2024): 1,023

Giv'at Ko'ah (Hebrew: גִּבְעַת כֹּ״חַ, lit. 'Hill of the Twenty Eight' or 'Strength Hill') is a moshav in the Central District of Israel. Located near Shoham, it falls under the jurisdiction of Hevel Modi'in Regional Council. In 2024 it had a population of 1,023.

== History ==
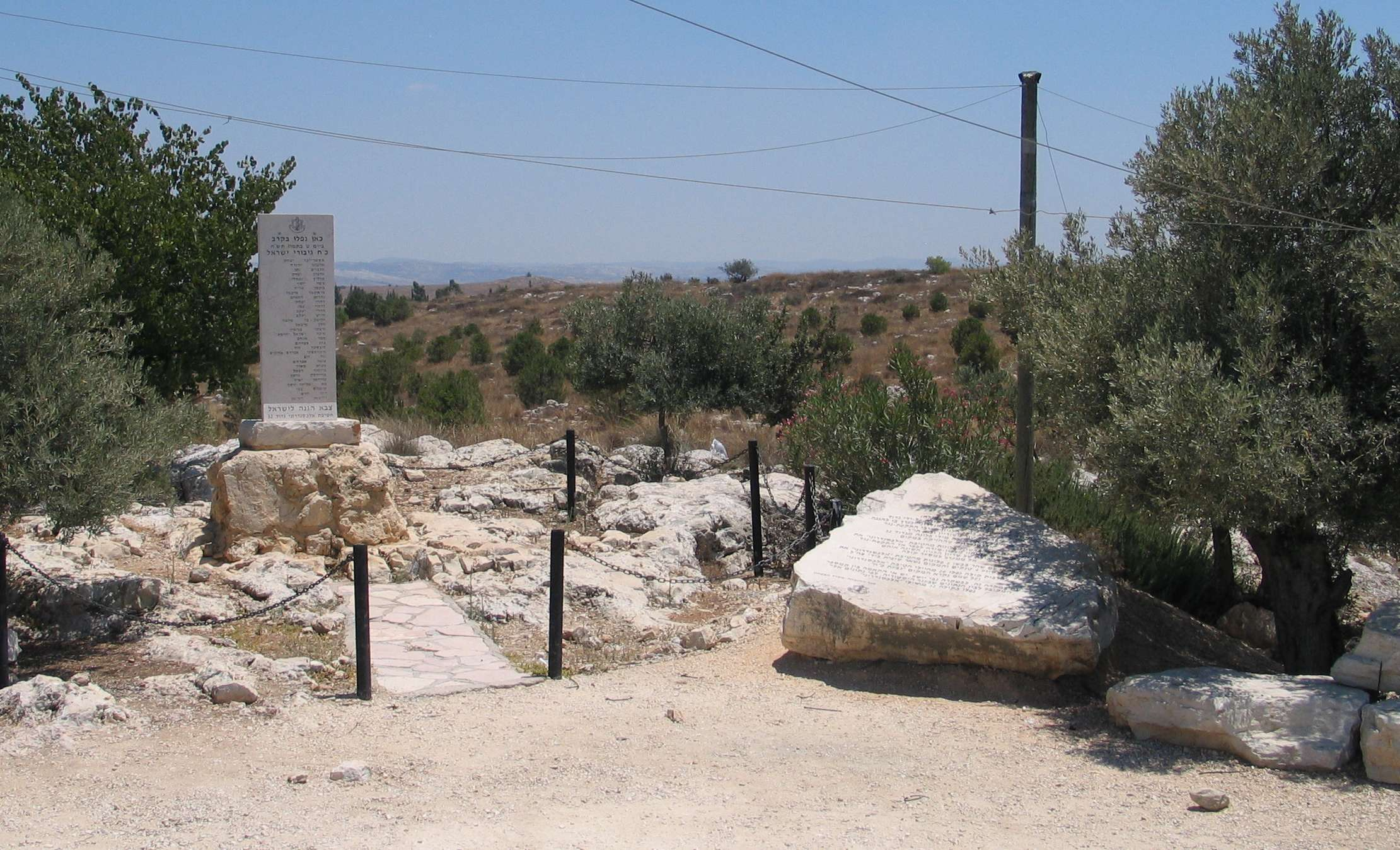
A memorial to the Alexandroni Brigade in Giv'at Ko'ah, Israel.

During the 18th and 19th centuries, the area around Giv'at Ko'ah belonged to the Nahiyeh (sub-district) of Lod that encompassed the area of the present-day city of Modi'in-Maccabim-Re'ut in the south to the present-day city of El'ad in the north, and from the foothills in the east, through the Lod Valley to the outskirts of Jaffa in the west. This area was home to thousands of inhabitants in about 20 villages, who had at their disposal tens of thousands of hectares of prime agricultural land.

The village was founded on 2 July 1950 by immigrants from Yemen. It was named for the 28 soldiers (כ״ח is the Hebrew numerals for 28) from the Alexandroni Brigade who died in fighting at Qula during the 1948 Arab-Israeli War. A monument to these soldiers is located on a hill about 3 km east of the village.

Giv'at Ko'ah, along with Tirat Yehuda and Bareket, is located near the former Palestinian village of al-Tira, which was destroyed during the 1948 Arab–Israeli War.

Giv'at Ko'ah was also home to a group of Cochin Jews who emigrated from the village of Chendamangalam, India. In 2010, the Nehemiah Mott Synagogue was built in Giv'at Ko'ah, named after a Yemenite kabbalist revered by this community.
