= Al-Tira, Ramle =

Al-Tira طيرة دندن
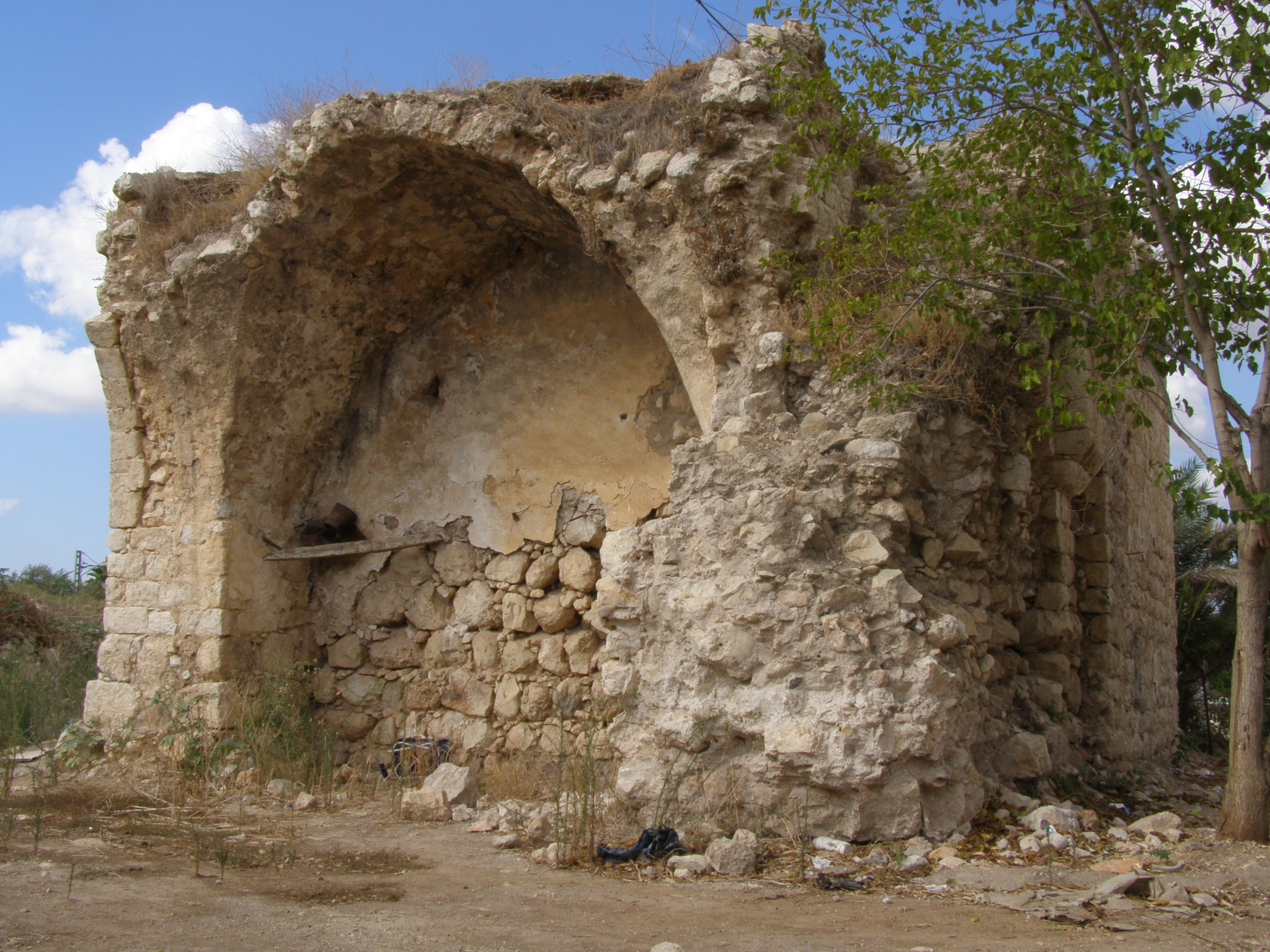
- Remains of the mosque of Al-Tira
- Etymology: "The Fort"
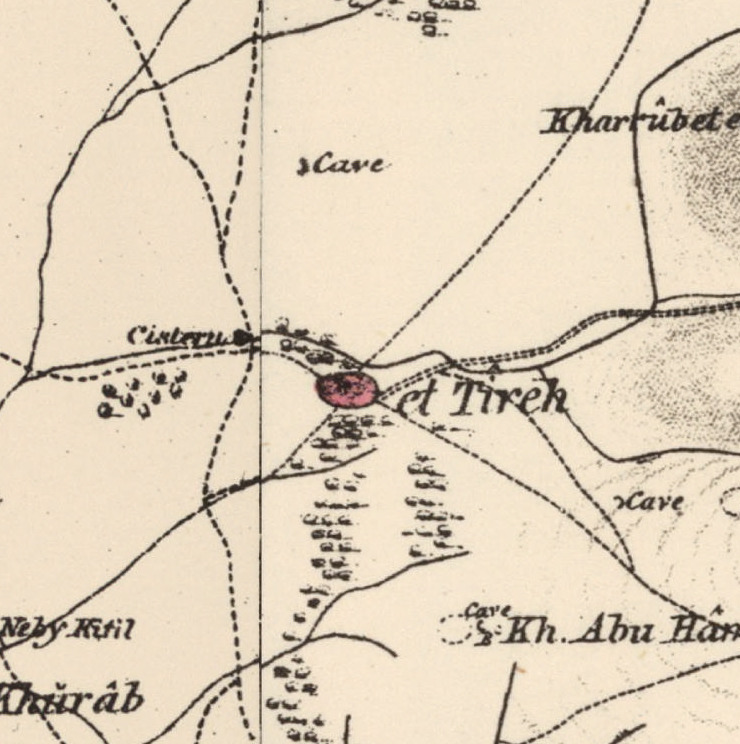
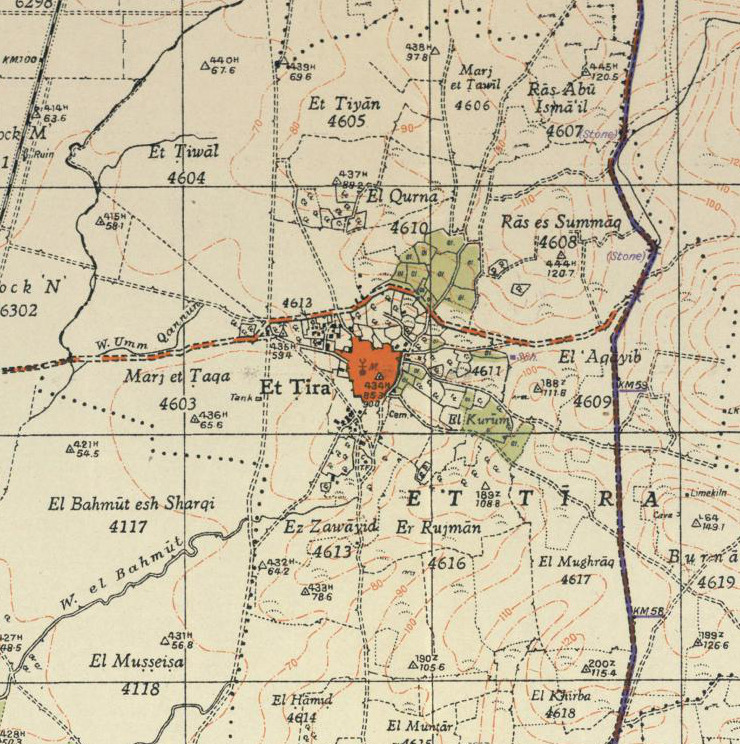
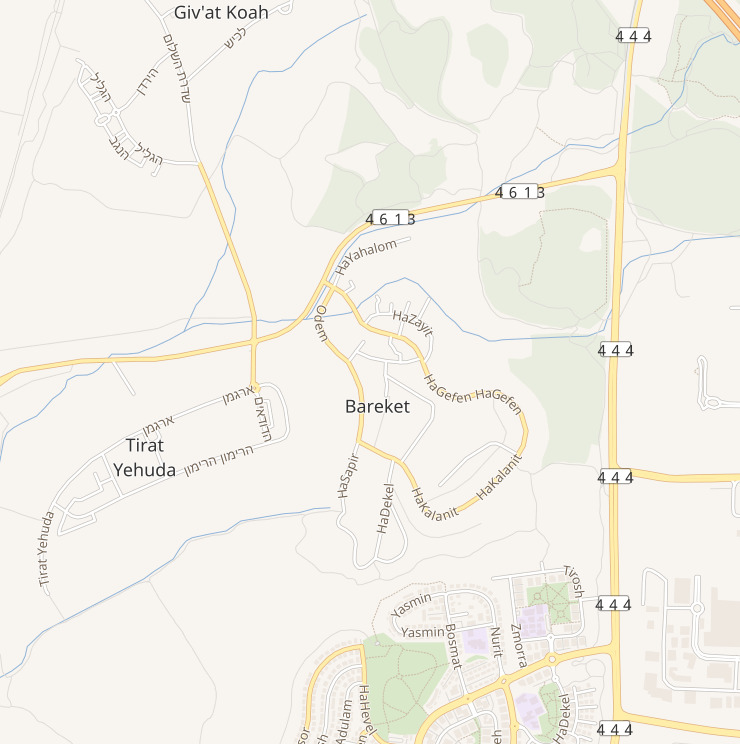
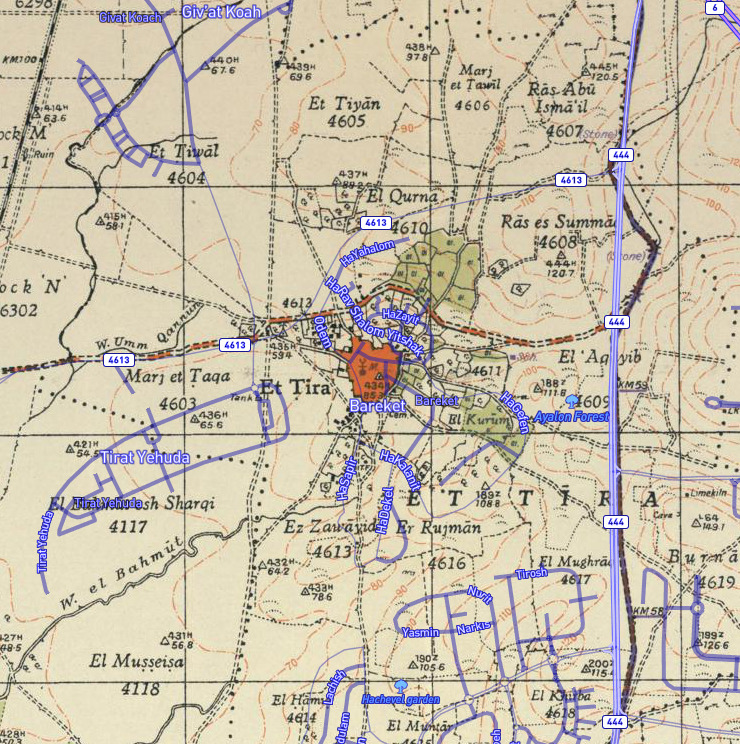
- 1870s map 1940s map modern map 1940s with modern overlay map A series of historical maps of the area around Al-Tira, Ramle (click the buttons)

- Location within Mandatory Palestine
- Coordinates: 32°01′02″N 34°56′35″E
- Palestine grid: 144/158
- Geopolitical entity: Mandatory Palestine
- Subdistrict: Ramle
- Date of depopulation: July 10, 1948

Area
  - Total: 6,956 dunams (6.956 km^{2}; 2.686 sq mi)

Population (1945)
  - Total: 1,290
- Cause(s) of depopulation: Military assault by Yishuv forces
- Current Localities: Tirat Yehuda, Giv'at Ko'ah, Bareket

See Tira for other sites with similar names.

Al-Tira was a Palestinian village in the Ramle Subdistrict. It was depopulated during the 1948 Arab–Israeli War on July 10, 1948, by the Alexandroni and Armored (Eighth) brigades under Operation Dani. It was located 12 km northeast of Ramla. Al-Tira was mostly destroyed with the exception of a few houses survived destruction.

== History ==
Archeological remains from Early Bronze Age, Iron Age II, Hellenistic and Roman era have been found.

A wine-press, dating to late Roman or early Byzantine era have been excavated, together with a cistern, dating from the pre-Byzantine era.

Crusader era remains have been found, together with remains from the Mamluk era.

=== Ottoman era ===
In 1517, Tira was incorporated into the Ottoman Empire along with the rest of Palestine, and by 1596 it was a part of the nahiya ("subdistrict") of Ramla, which was under the administration of the liwa ("district") of Gaza. A village of 26 households and 3 bachelors, an estimated 160 persons, Muslims. They paid a fixed tax rate of 25% on agricultural products, such as wheat, barley, vineyards, fruit trees, beehives, and goats, a total of 6,800 akçe.

In 1863, Victor Guérin noted Al-Tira situated about 2 kilometres south of Qula, and containing five hundred inhabitants. Guérin also found here "caves and a tomb cut in the rock; also, still standing, the door of an ancient house, its two jambs formed of great cut stones covered by a splendid block forming the lintel, and formerly decorated by mouldings, now effaced". An Ottoman village list from about the same year (1870) indicated 54 houses and a population of 385, though the population count included men, only.

In 1882, the PEF's Survey of Western Palestine described it as: "A mud village of moderate size, with cactus hedges, situated at the edge of the plain, the hills rising behind; on the west, by the high road, is a good well, with remains of masonry".

In 1896, the population of Et-tire was estimated to be about 210 persons.

=== British Mandate era ===
In the 1922 census of Palestine conducted by the British Mandate authorities, Tireh had a population of 705, all Muslims, increasing in the 1931 census to 892, still all Muslims, in a total of 225 houses.

An elementary school was founded in 1922, and by 1947–48, it had an enrollment of 110 boys and 22 girls.

In the 1945 statistics the population was 1,290, all Muslims, while the total land area was 6,956 dunams, according to an official land and population survey. Of this, 78 were allocated for plantations and irrigable land, 5,551 for cereals, while 45 dunams were classified as built-up areas.

Al-'Umari Mosque was one of the notable landmarks.

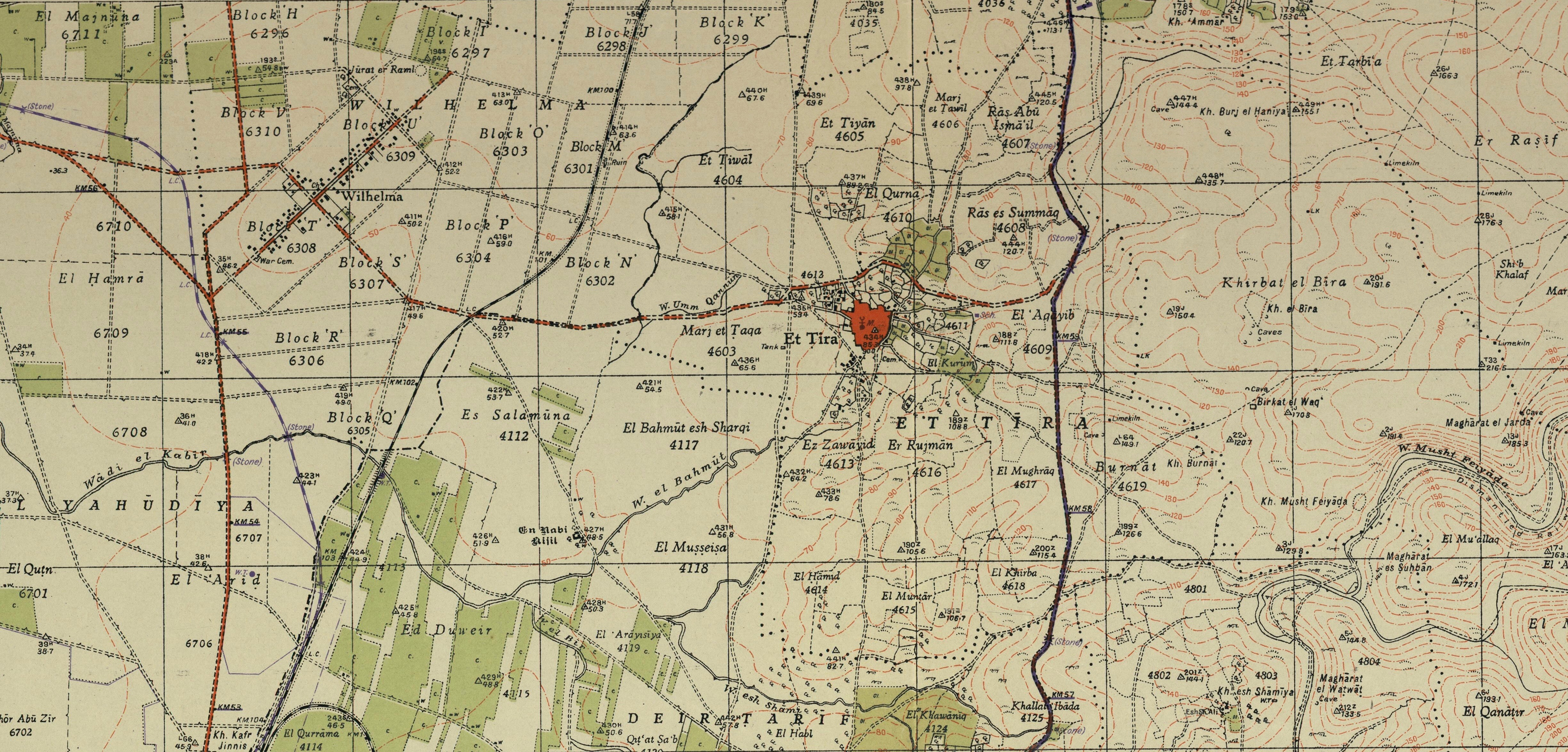
Al-Tira 1942 1:20,000

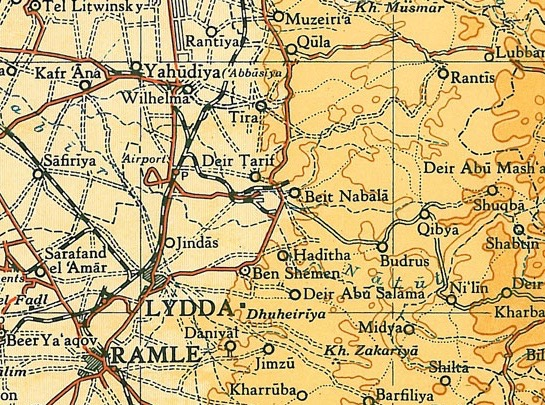
Al-Tira (Tira) 1945 1:250,000

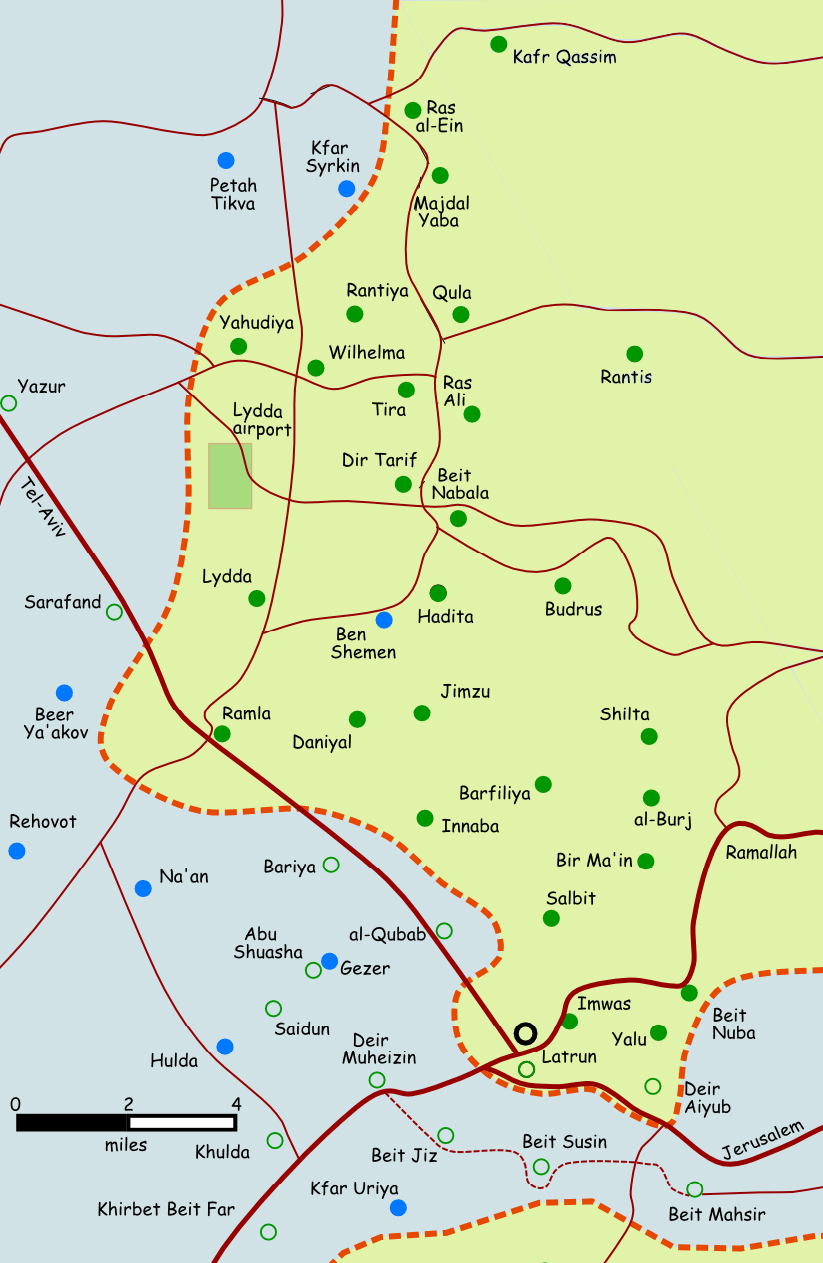
Depopulated villages in the Ramle Subdistrict

=== 1948, and aftermath ===
The village became depopulated on July 10, 1948, after a military assault by the Israeli army. On the same day, Operation Danny headquarter ordered the Yiftach Brigade to blow up most of Innaba and Al-Tira, leaving only houses enough for a small garrison.

The Israeli settlements of Tirat Yehuda, Giv'at Ko'ah and Bareket are all on the land of Al-Tira.

In 1992 the village site was described: "The site, situated next to paved road, is partly deserted and overgrown with a variety of trees, such as olive, date palm, fig and gum trees. The rubble of some of the destroyed houses is visible. A number of stone houses survive, however; some are deserted, others are occupied by Israelis, and still others are used as stables for livestock. A deserted house, fenced in with barbed wire, has high, round-arched windows and a flat roof; the yard is overgrown with untended grass. One of the occupied houses is quite modest. It has a rectangular door and window and a flat roof; date-palm and other trees grow on two sides. A second, larger, occupied house has two stories and a wide porch, and is also surrounded by trees. A third is also quite large and has two stories; a side stairway leads to a second-floor porch and there is a large, round arched entrance on the first floor. There are some destroyed houses inside the settlement of Bareqet. Some of the surrounding land is planted in grapes and kiwi fruit."

== Bibliography ==
- Barron, J. B., ed. (1923). Palestine: Report and General Abstracts of the Census of 1922. Government of Palestine.
- Conder, C.R.; Kitchener, H.H. (1882). The Survey of Western Palestine: Memoirs of the Topography, Orography, Hydrography, and Archaeology. Vol. 2. London: Committee of the Palestine Exploration Fund. (p.378)
- Department of Statistics (1945). Village Statistics, April, 1945. Government of Palestine.
- Guérin, V. (1875). Description Géographique Historique et Archéologique de la Palestine (in French). Vol. 2: Samarie, pt. 2. Paris: L'Imprimerie Nationale.
- Hadawi, S. (1970). Village Statistics of 1945: A Classification of Land and Area ownership in Palestine. Palestine Liberation Organization Research Center. Archived from the original on 2018-12-08.
- Hartmann, M. (1883). "Die Ortschaftenliste des Liwa Jerusalem in dem türkischen Staatskalender für Syrien auf das Jahr 1288 der Flucht (1871)". Zeitschrift des Deutschen Palästina-Vereins. 6: 102–149.
- Hillel, Gili (2009-05-04). "Khirbat et-Tira" (121). Hadashot Arkheologiyot – Excavations and Surveys in Israel.
- Hütteroth, W.-D.; Abdulfattah, K. (1977). Historical Geography of Palestine, Transjordan and Southern Syria in the Late 16th Century. Erlanger Geographische Arbeiten, Sonderband 5. Erlangen, Germany: Vorstand der Fränkischen Geographischen Gesellschaft. ISBN 3-920405-41-2.
- Itach, Gilad; Zuckerman-Cooper, Roni (2016-08-06). "Khirbet et-Tira (Bareket)" (128). Hadashot Arkheologiyot – Excavations and Surveys in Israel.
- Khalidi, W. (1992). All That Remains: The Palestinian Villages Occupied and Depopulated by Israel in 1948. Washington D.C.: Institute for Palestine Studies. ISBN 0-88728-224-5.
- Masarwa, Durar (2012-10-16). "Khirbat et-Tira" (124). Hadashot Arkheologiyot – Excavations and Surveys in Israel.
- Mills, E., ed. (1932). Census of Palestine 1931. Population of Villages, Towns and Administrative Areas. Jerusalem: Government of Palestine.
- Morris, B. (2004). The Birth of the Palestinian Refugee Problem Revisited. Cambridge University Press. ISBN 978-0-521-00967-6.
- Palmer, E.H. (1881). The Survey of Western Palestine: Arabic and English Name Lists Collected During the Survey by Lieutenants Conder and Kitchener, R. E. Transliterated and Explained by E.H. Palmer. Committee of the Palestine Exploration Fund.
- al-Qawuqji, F. (1972): Memoirs of al-Qawuqji, Fauzi in Journal of Palestine Studies
  - "Memoirs, 1948, Part I" in 1, no. 4 (Sum. 1972): 27-58., dpf-file, downloadable
  - "Memoirs, 1948, Part II" in 2, no. 1 (Aut. 1972): 3-33., dpf-file, downloadable
- Romano, Amit (2004-05-31). "Khirbat et-Tira" (116). Hadashot Arkheologiyot – Excavations and Surveys in Israel.
- Schick, C. (1896). "Zur Einwohnerzahl des Bezirks Jerusalem". Zeitschrift des Deutschen Palästina-Vereins. 19: 120–127.
- Socin, A. (1879). "Alphabetisches Verzeichniss von Ortschaften des Paschalik Jerusalem". Zeitschrift des Deutschen Palästina-Vereins. 2: 135–163.
- Zelinger, Yehiel (2005-11-06). "Khirbet et-Tira (Bareket)" (117). Hadashot Arkheologiyot – Excavations and Surveys in Israel.
