= Qula =

Qula قولة Kouleh Cola, Chola
- Former village
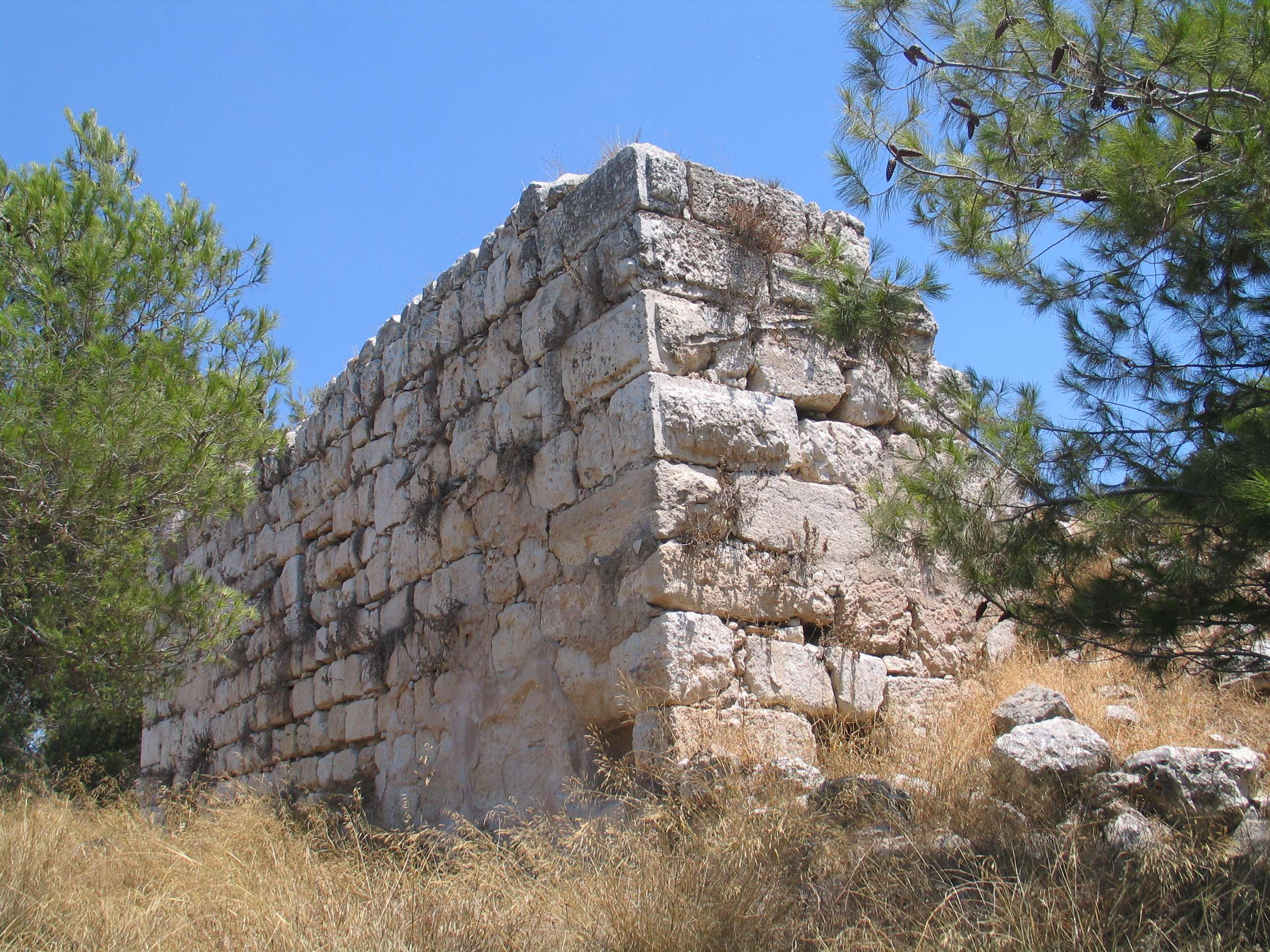
- The remains of the Crusader tower at Qula. The village mosque was located about 10m to the east of it.
- Etymology: from a personal name
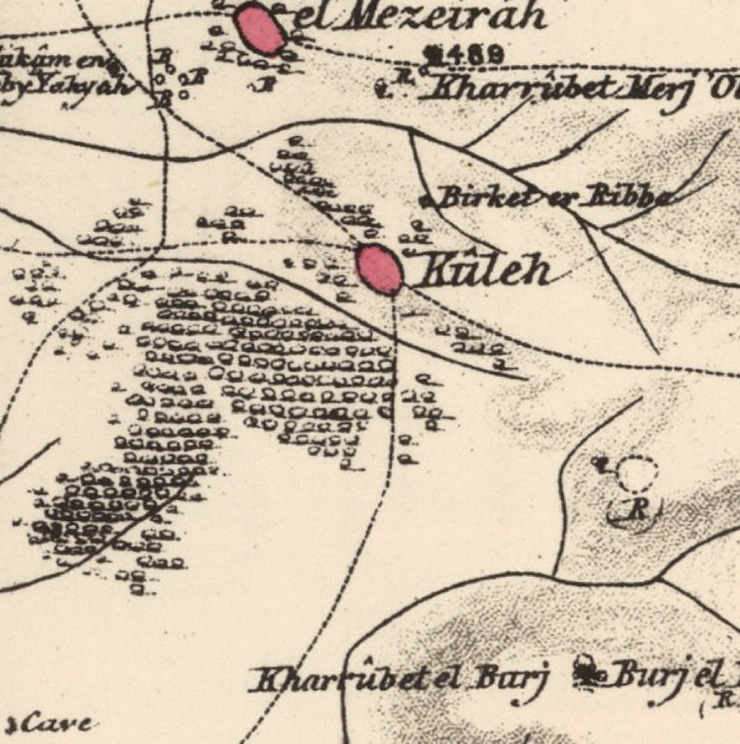
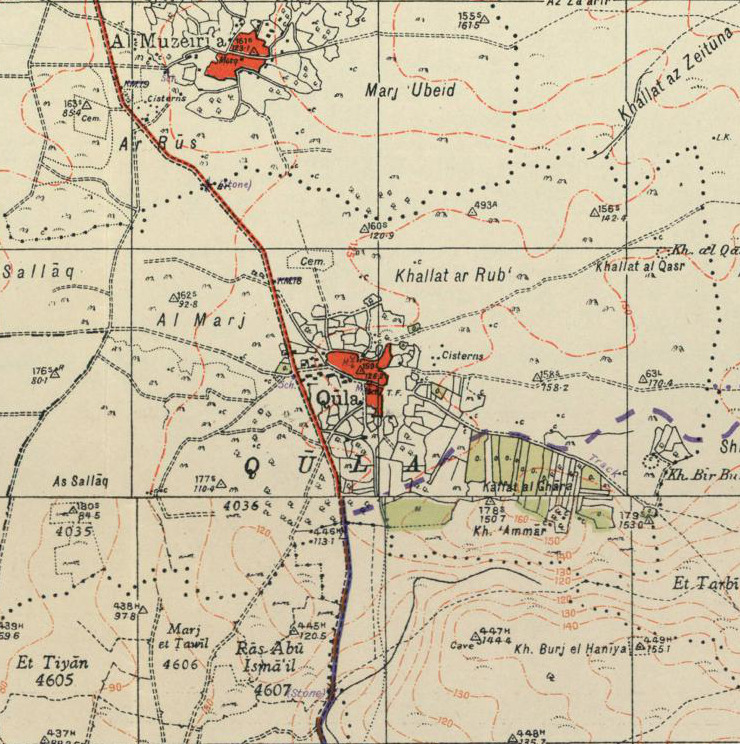
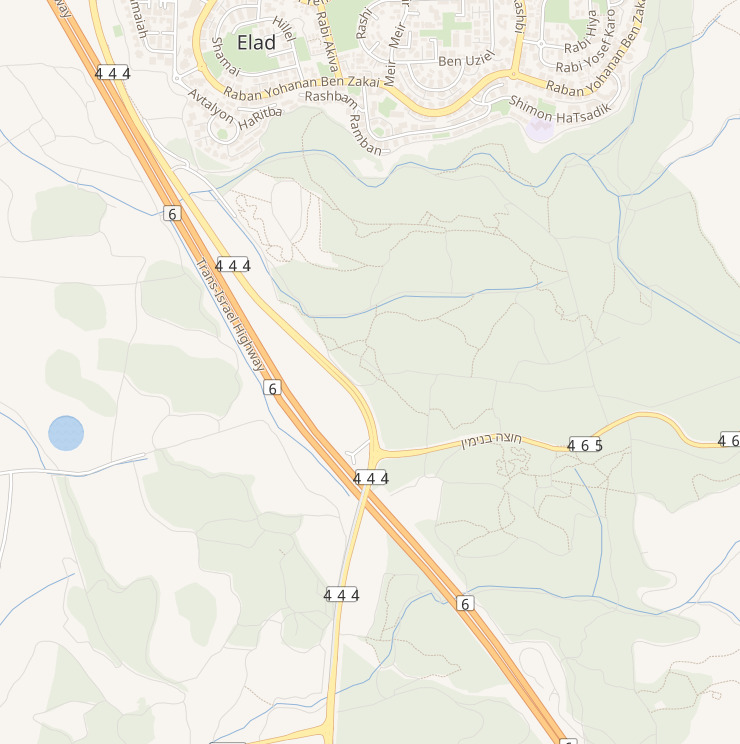
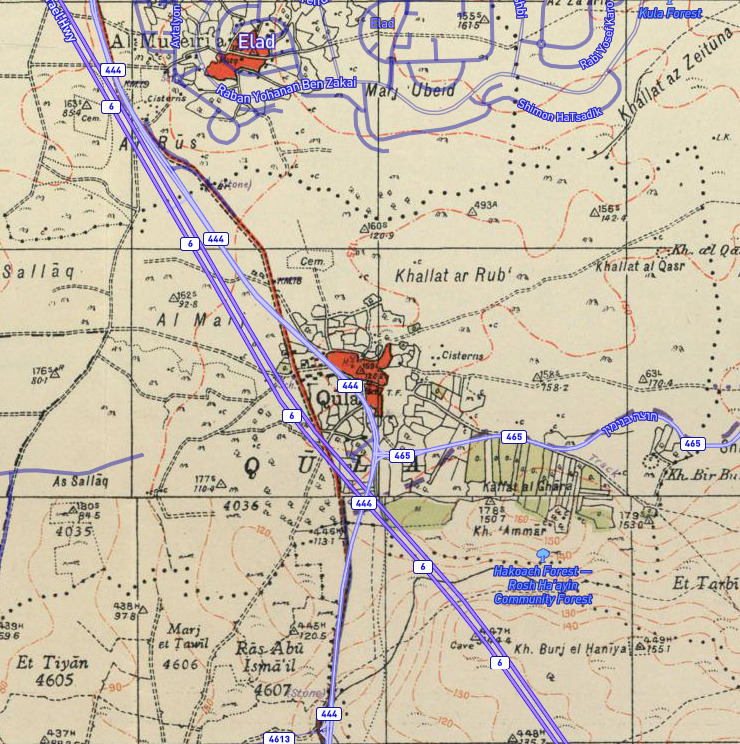
- 1870s map 1940s map modern map 1940s with modern overlay map A series of historical maps of the area around Qula (click the buttons)

- Location within Mandatory Palestine
- Coordinates: 32°02′15″N 34°57′20″E
- Palestine grid: 146/160
- Geopolitical entity: Mandatory Palestine
- Subdistrict: Ramle
- Date of depopulation: 10 July 1948

Area
  - Total: 4,347 dunams (4.347 km^{2}; 1.678 sq mi)

Population (1945)
  - Total: 1,010
- Cause(s) of depopulation: Military assault by Yishuv forces

Qula (Arabic: قولة), also spelled and pronounced as Quliya, was a Palestinian village in the Ramle Subdistrict of Mandatory Palestine, located 15 km northeast of Ramla. Its residents had their origins in Jimzu, Ammuriya and other places.

Palestinian commander Hasan Salama, and his son Ali Hassan Salameh (1940-1979) were from Qula. The village was depopulated during the 1948 Arab-Israeli War.

== Etymology ==
The name Qula is of Aramaic origins. it is first documented in Crusader form as: Chola or Cola.

== History ==
=== Crusader period ===
During the twelfth century the Hospitallers established an administrative and collection centre in the village, comprising a tower and a vaulted structure.

=== Ottoman period ===
In 1596, Qula was part of the Ottoman Empire, nahiya (subdistrict) of al-Ramla under the Liwa of Gaza, with a population 69 Muslim households; an estimated population of 380. The villagers paid taxes on goats and beehives, and a press that was used for processing either olives or grapes, in addition of a fixed sum: a total of 6,650 akçe.

In 1838, Kuleh was among the villages Edward Robinson noted from the top of the White Mosque, Ramla.

In 1870, the French explorer Victor Guérin noted: "This village, located on a rocky hill, obviously replaced a small town or ancient village. There is a large building now divided into several private dwellings, built either by the Muslims or by the Christians at the time of the Crusades, with cut stones removed from old buildings.

Besides, there is another construction, less extensive than the preceding one, but the lower courses of which are formed with much larger blocks, either flattened or cut into bosses, still serving at present as a tower, or defense tower.

All the upper part is of a much more recent date. A small mosque is similarly built with materials of which at least half seem ancient. At the door in particular of this sanctuary the feet are decorated with moldings that seem to be pointing to a time before the Muslim invasion. Finally, near the village, a birket, (a pond), 18 paces by 12 wide, is probably not the work of the Arabs. It is partly dug in the rock and partly constructed of large polygonal blocks coated with thick cement."

An Ottoman village list from about the same year, 1870, showed Kula with a population of 159, in 38 houses, though the population count included men, only.

In 1882, the PEF's Survey of Western Palestine (SWP) the village of Qula was described as being situated on a slope at the edge of a plain; its historical relics dating back to medieval times. The SWP also noted ancient remains.

The village mosque stood approximately 10m east of the Crusader tower. It comprised a large vaulted iwan and a smaller room with an inscription above the entrance.

=== British Mandate ===
During the British mandate period, the village expanded along the Ramle-Tulkarm highway. In the village center was the mosque, several small shops, and a school which had been founded in 1919. By the mid-1940s the school had 134 students.

In the 1922 census of Palestine, Quleh had a population of 480 Muslims, increasing in the 1931 census to 697, still all Muslims, in a total of 172 houses.

In the 1945 statistics the population was 1,010, all Muslims, while the total land area was 4,347 dunams, according to an official land and population survey. Of this, a total of 2,842 dunums of land was used for cereals, 105 dunums were irrigated or used for orchards, while 26 dunams were classified as built-up areas.

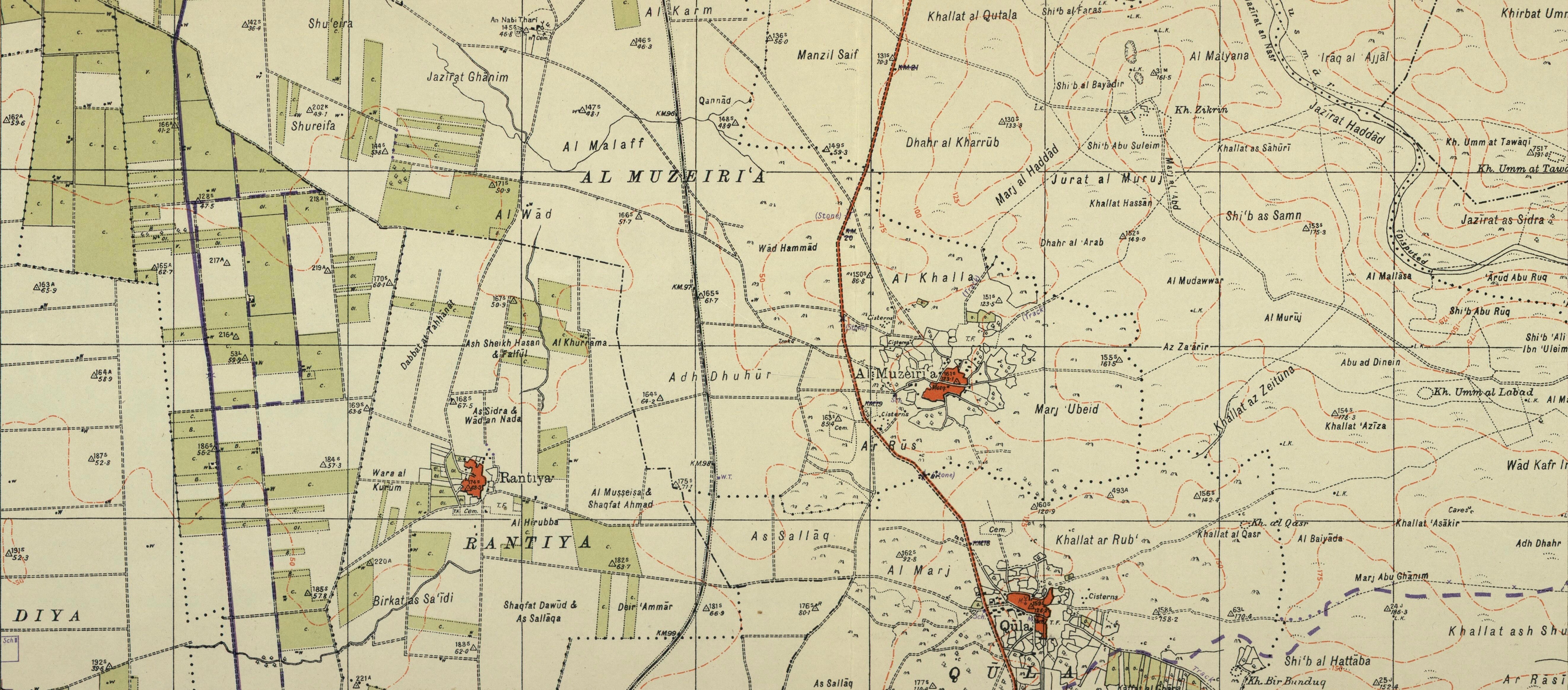
Qula 1941 1:20,000

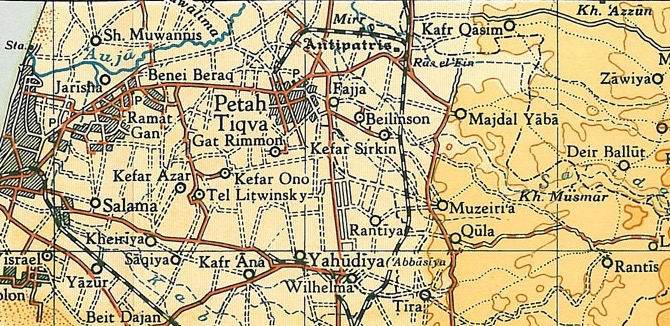
Qula 1945 1:250,000

=== 1948 Arab-Israeli War and aftermath ===
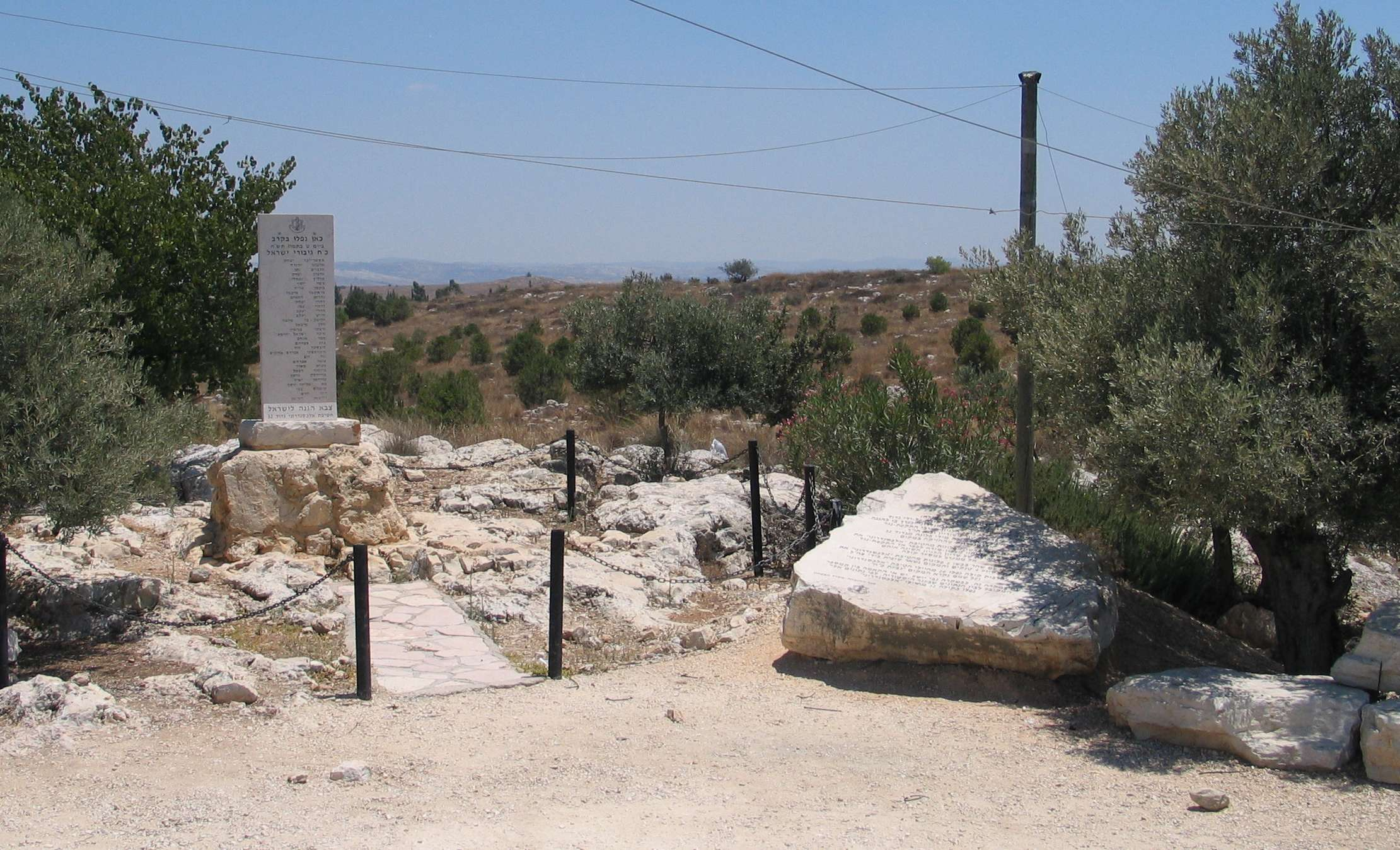
A memorial to the Alexandroni Brigade in Giv'at Ko'ah, Israel, lies near the former village of Qula.

Fighting in the region took place between the IDF and Arab Legion's forces during Operation Dani during the "Ten Days" after the end of the First Truce in the 1948 War. The IDF's Alexandroni Brigade had been sent to secure the area south of the Iraqi Army's zone of control, and fought over the village with the Arab League's First Brigade. The IDF captured the village for the last time on July 18, just before the start of the Second Truce. An IDF report stated that after capture of the village, the mutilated bodies of 19 members of the Alexandroni Brigade were discovered. Most of the villagers fled during the war, leaving only a few, primarily elderly behind. In the late 1990s, researcher Abdel Jawad reported testimony from former villagers who stated that six women and one man who were left behind were shot or burned to death in their homes.

The ruins of the town can be found in the Kula Forest in Israel. In 1992, The Palestinian historian Walid Khalidi described the site: "A forest covers much of the village site. The rubble of crumbled houses and terraces lies among the trees, and cactuses and fig, mulberry, and eucalyptus trees grow there as well. The only remaining landmark is the school, on the west side of the site. The hilly parts of the surrounding land are used for grazing animals; the rest of the land is cultivated."

== See also ==
- Depopulated Palestinian locations in Israel
- List of villages depopulated during the Arab-Israeli conflict

== Bibliography ==
- Barron, J.B., ed. (1923). Palestine: Report and General Abstracts of the Census of 1922. Government of Palestine.
- Conder, C.R.; Kitchener, H.H. (1882). The Survey of Western Palestine: Memoirs of the Topography, Orography, Hydrography, and Archaeology. Vol. 2. London: Committee of the Palestine Exploration Fund.
- Eshed, Vered (2011-06-12). "Qula Final Report". Hadashot Arkheologiyot – Excavations and Surveys in Israel (123).
- Government of Palestine, Department of Statistics (1945). Village Statistics, April, 1945.
- Guérin, V. (1875). Description Géographique Historique et Archéologique de la Palestine (in French). Vol. 2: Samarie, pt. 2. Paris: L'Imprimerie Nationale.
- Hadawi, S. (1970). Village Statistics of 1945: A Classification of Land and Area ownership in Palestine. Palestine Liberation Organization Research Center.
- Hartmann, M. (1883). "Die Ortschaftenliste des Liwa Jerusalem in dem türkischen Staatskalender für Syrien auf das Jahr 1288 der Flucht (1871)". Zeitschrift des Deutschen Palästina-Vereins. 6: 102–149.
- Hütteroth, W.-D.; Abdulfattah, K. (1977). Historical Geography of Palestine, Transjordan and Southern Syria in the Late 16th Century. Erlanger Geographische Arbeiten, Sonderband 5. Erlangen, Germany: Vorstand der Fränkischen Geographischen Gesellschaft. ISBN 3-920405-41-2.
- Khalidi, W. (1992). All That Remains: The Palestinian Villages Occupied and Depopulated by Israel in 1948. Washington D.C.: Institute for Palestine Studies. ISBN 0-88728-224-5.
- Le Strange, G. (1890). Palestine Under the Moslems: A Description of Syria and the Holy Land from A.D. 650 to 1500. Committee of the Palestine Exploration Fund.
- Mills, E., ed. (1932). Census of Palestine 1931. Population of Villages, Towns and Administrative Areas. Jerusalem: Government of Palestine.
- Morris, B. (2004). The Birth of the Palestinian Refugee Problem Revisited. Cambridge University Press. ISBN 978-0-521-00967-6.
- Morris, B. (2008). 1948: A History of the First Arab-Israeli War. Yale University Press.
- Palmer, E.H. (1881). The Survey of Western Palestine: Arabic and English Name Lists Collected During the Survey by Lieutenants Conder and Kitchener, R. E. Transliterated and Explained by E.H. Palmer. Committee of the Palestine Exploration Fund.
- Petersen, Andrew (2001). A Gazetteer of Buildings in Muslim Palestine (British Academy Monographs in Archaeology). Vol. I. Oxford University Press. ISBN 978-0-19-727011-0. Archived from the original on 2021-05-28.
- Pringle, R. D. (1986), The Red Tower (al-Burj al-Ahmar): Settlement in the Plain of Sharon at the Time of the Crusaders and Mamluks, A.D. 1099-1516, British School of Archeology in Jerusalem Monograph Series, No. 1, London. (Cited in Petersen, 2001)
- Pringle, D. (1997). Secular buildings in the Crusader Kingdom of Jerusalem: an archaeological Gazetter. Cambridge University Press. ISBN 9780521460101. (Cited in Petersen, 2001) (p.87, cites SWP, 1882, II, p.297 and p.358)
- Robinson, E.; Smith, E. (1841). Biblical Researches in Palestine, Mount Sinai and Arabia Petraea: A Journal of Travels in the year 1838. Vol. 3. Boston: Crocker & Brewster.
- Röhricht, R. (1893). (RRH) Regesta regni Hierosolymitani (MXCVII-MCCXCI) (in Latin). Berlin: Libraria Academica Wageriana. (p. 162, no. 611)
- Sa'di, A.H.; Abu-Lughod, L. (2007). Nakba. Columbia University Press. ISBN 978-0-231-13579-5.
- Socin, A. (1879). "Alphabetisches Verzeichniss von Ortschaften des Paschalik Jerusalem". Zeitschrift des Deutschen Palästina-Vereins. 2: 135–163.
- Spivak, Polina; Kanias, Tzach (2010-12-30). "Qula, Survey Final Report". Hadashot Arkheologiyot – Excavations and Surveys in Israel (122).
