= Bareket =

Moshav in central Israel

Bareket: ברקת (Hebrew)
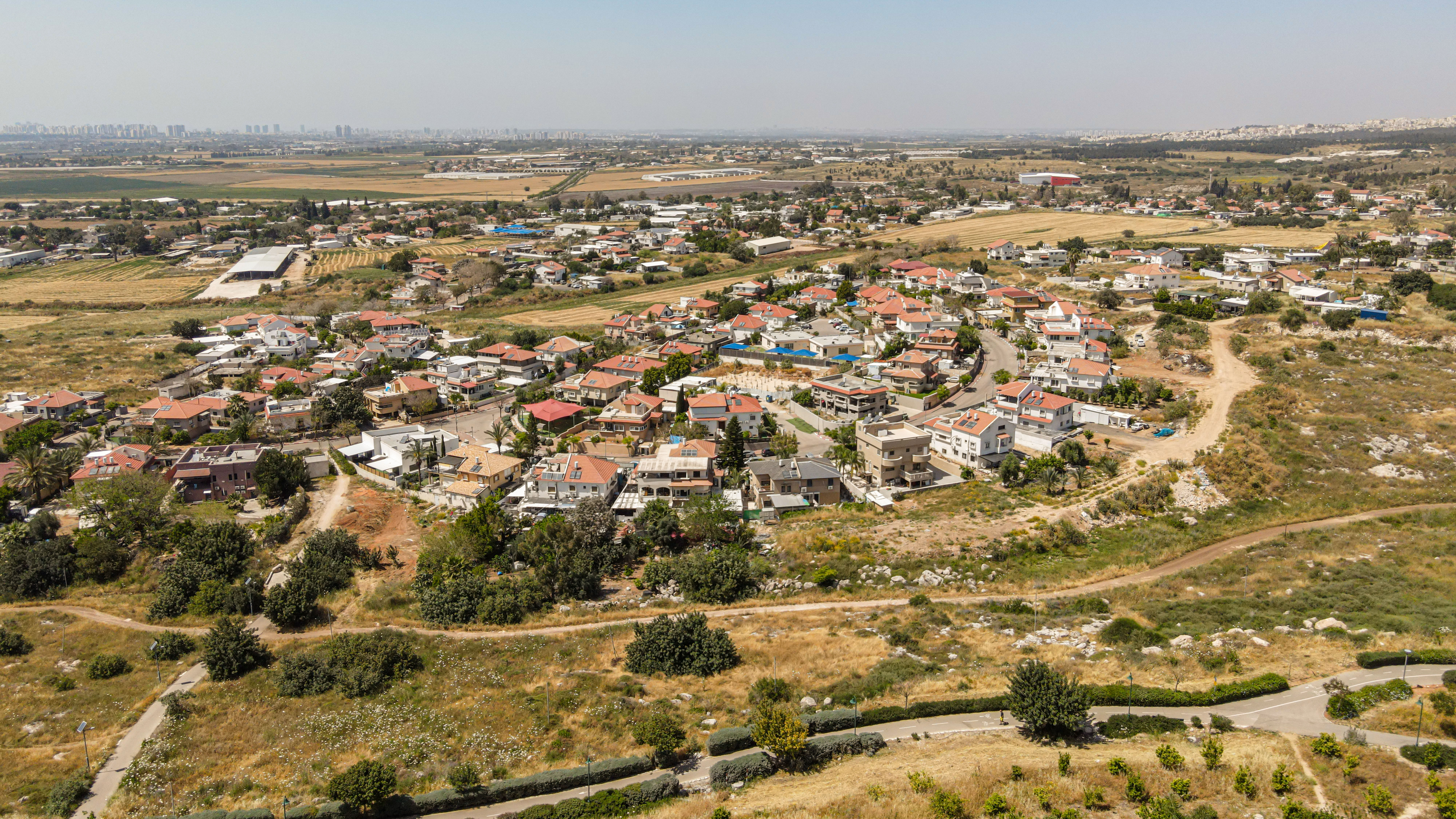
- Etymology: Emerald
- Location within Central Israel Location within Israel
- Coordinates: 32°0′54″N 34°56′39″E
- Grid position: 144/158 PAL
- Country: Israel
- District: Central
- Subdistrict: Petah Tikva
- Council: Hevel Modi'in
- Affiliation: Hapoel HaMizrachi
- Founded: 1952
- Founder: Yemenite Hapoel HaMizrachi members
- Population (2024): 2,232
- Website: www.mbareket.co.il

Bareket (Hebrew: ברקת, lit. 'Emerald') is a religious Zionist moshav in the Central District of Israel. Located near the town of Shoham and the Judean Foothills, around five kilometres north-east of Ben Gurion International Airport and covering 2,500 dunams, it falls under the jurisdiction of Hevel Modi'in Regional Council. In 2024 it had a population of 2,232.

== History ==
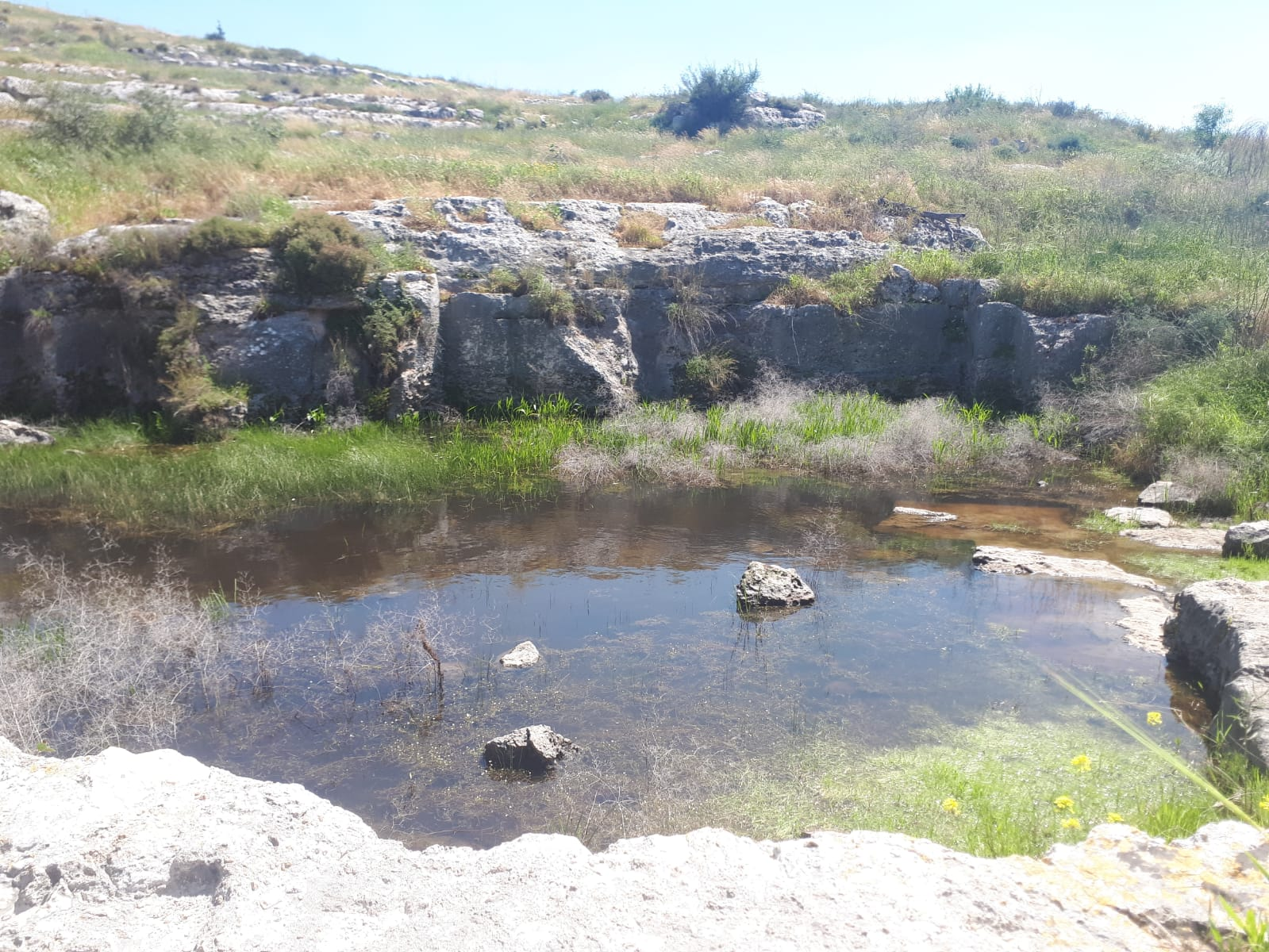
Pond in Bareket

Prior to 1948, Bareket was the site of the Palestinian Arab village of Al-Tira. It belonged to the Nahiyeh (sub-district) of Lod that encompassed the area of the present-day city of Modi'in-Maccabim-Re'ut in the south to the present-day city of El'ad in the north, and from the foothills in the east, through the Lod Valley to the outskirts of Jaffa in the west. In the 1945 statistics its population was 1,290, all Arab Muslim. However, the village was depopulated on 10 July 1948 after a military assault by the Israeli army. On the same day, Operation Danny headquarters ordered the Yiftach Brigade to blow up most of Innaba and al-Tira, leaving only houses enough for a small garrison.

The village of Bareket was established in 1952 by members of Hapoel HaMizrachi who had immigrated from Habban District in south-east Yemen. The new village was built on the ruins al-Tira. It was initially named Kfar Halutzim (Pioneers' Village) and then Tirat Yehuda Bet (after nearby Tirat Yehuda), before adopting its current name. Like other villages nearby as Nofekh, Shoham, Leshem and Ahlama (the former name of Beit Arif) nearby, the name relates to one of the 12 stones in the Hoshen, the sacred breastplate worn by a Jewish high priest (Exodus 28:17).

== Transportation ==
=== Roads ===
The village has one entrance off of Highway 4613, an East-West road of local importance. This entrance has a gate, a security guard kiosk and a large stone entrance sign. Highway 4613 connects to Highway 444 on the East, which connects to El'ad in the North, Shoham and Highway 1 to Jerusalem in the South. On the West, highway 4613 connects to Highway 40 and Highway 46, which provide connection to Petah Tikva, Tel Aviv, and Ben Gurion Airport.

Despite being only two kilometres away from Highway 6 (Trans-Israel Highway), the village has no direct access.

=== Public transportation ===
The village of Bareket is served by four bus routes, run by Kavim Company. four bus routes, 173 and 385 circulate within the village itself, whereas bus routes 58 and 85 have a stop just at the main entrance of the village off of Highway 4813.

- Line 58 (Kavim) connects Shoham to Ramat Gan, running once every 1 hour and 25 minutes throughout the day. The line does not run on Shabbat. This bus has a stop at the entrance of Bareket.
- Line 85 (Kavim) connects Shoham to Petah Tikva, running once every 25 minutes throughout the day. The line does not run on Shabbat. This bus has a stop at the entrance of Bareket.
- Line 173 (Kavim) connects El'ad to Ramat Gan, running every 1 hour and 25 minutes throughout the day. The line also runs on Shabbat. This bus circulates the streets of the village.
- Line 385 (Kavim) connects Shoham Industrial Park to Petah Tikva, running every 2 hour and 10 minutes throughout the day. The line does not run on Shabbat. This bus circulates the streets of the village.
