= Tirat Yehuda =

Moshav in central Israel

Tirat Yehuda: טִירַת יְהוּדָה (Hebrew)
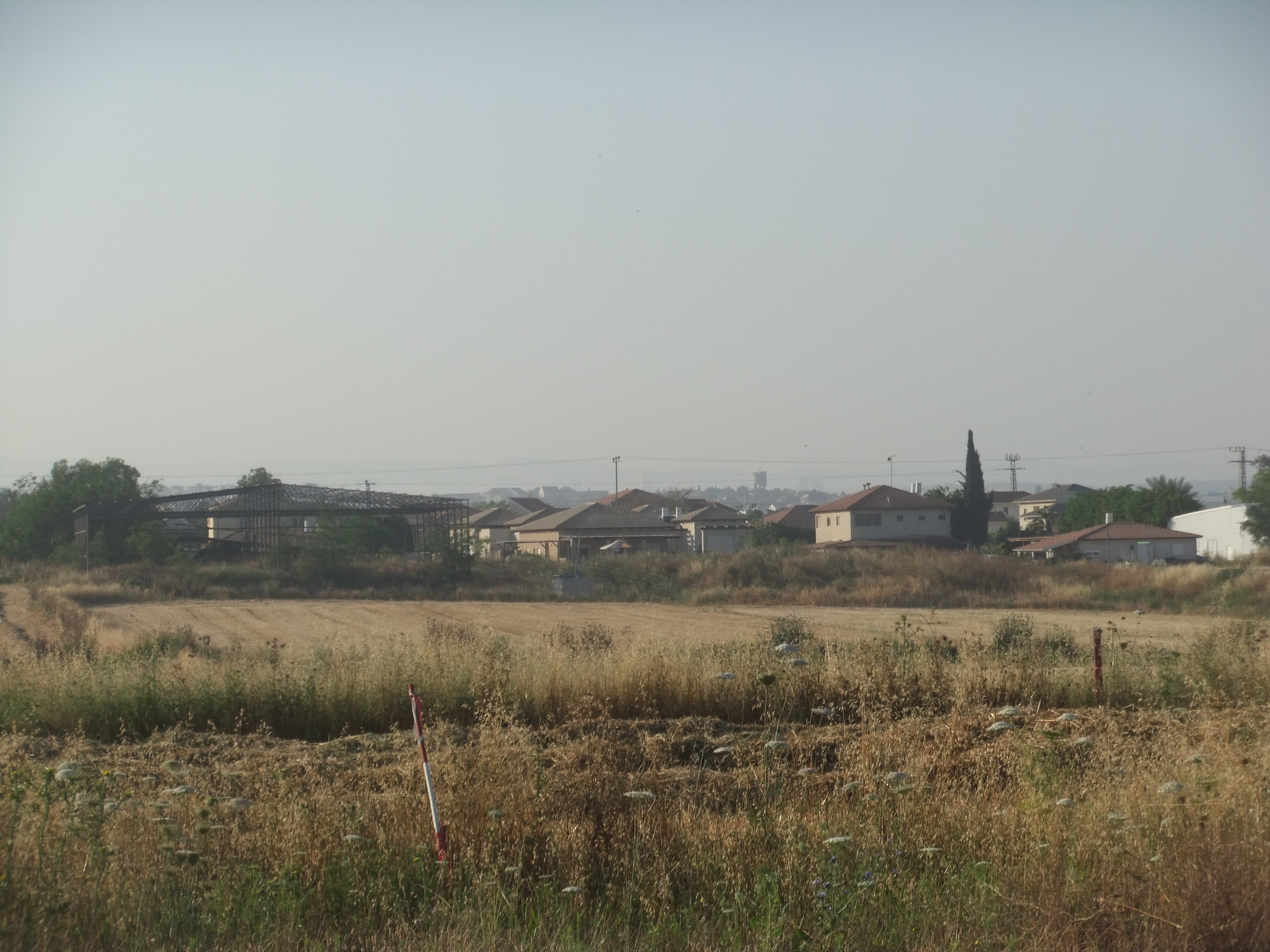

- Location within Central Israel
- Coordinates: 32°0′48″N 34°55′57″E
- Grid position: 143/157 PAL
- Country: Israel
- District: Central
- Subdistrict: Petah Tikva
- Council: Hevel Modi'in
- Affiliation: Hapoel HaMizrachi
- Founded: 1949
- Founder: Hungarian Jewish immigrants
- Population (2024): 1,256

Tirat Yehuda (Hebrew: טִירַת יְהוּדָה, lit. 'Judah's Castle') is a national religious moshav in the Central District of Israel. Located near Shoham, it falls under the jurisdiction of Hevel Modi'in Regional Council. In 2024 it had a population of 1,256.

== History ==
During the 18th and 19th centuries, Tirat Yehuda was the site of the village of al-Tira (Tirat Dandan). It belonged to the Nahiyeh (sub-district) of Lod that encompassed the area of the present-day city of Modi'in-Maccabim-Re'ut in the south to the present-day city of El'ad in the north, and from the foothills in the east, through the Lod Valley to the outskirts of Jaffa in the west. This area was home to thousands of inhabitants in about 20 villages, who had at their disposal tens of thousands of hectares of prime agricultural land.

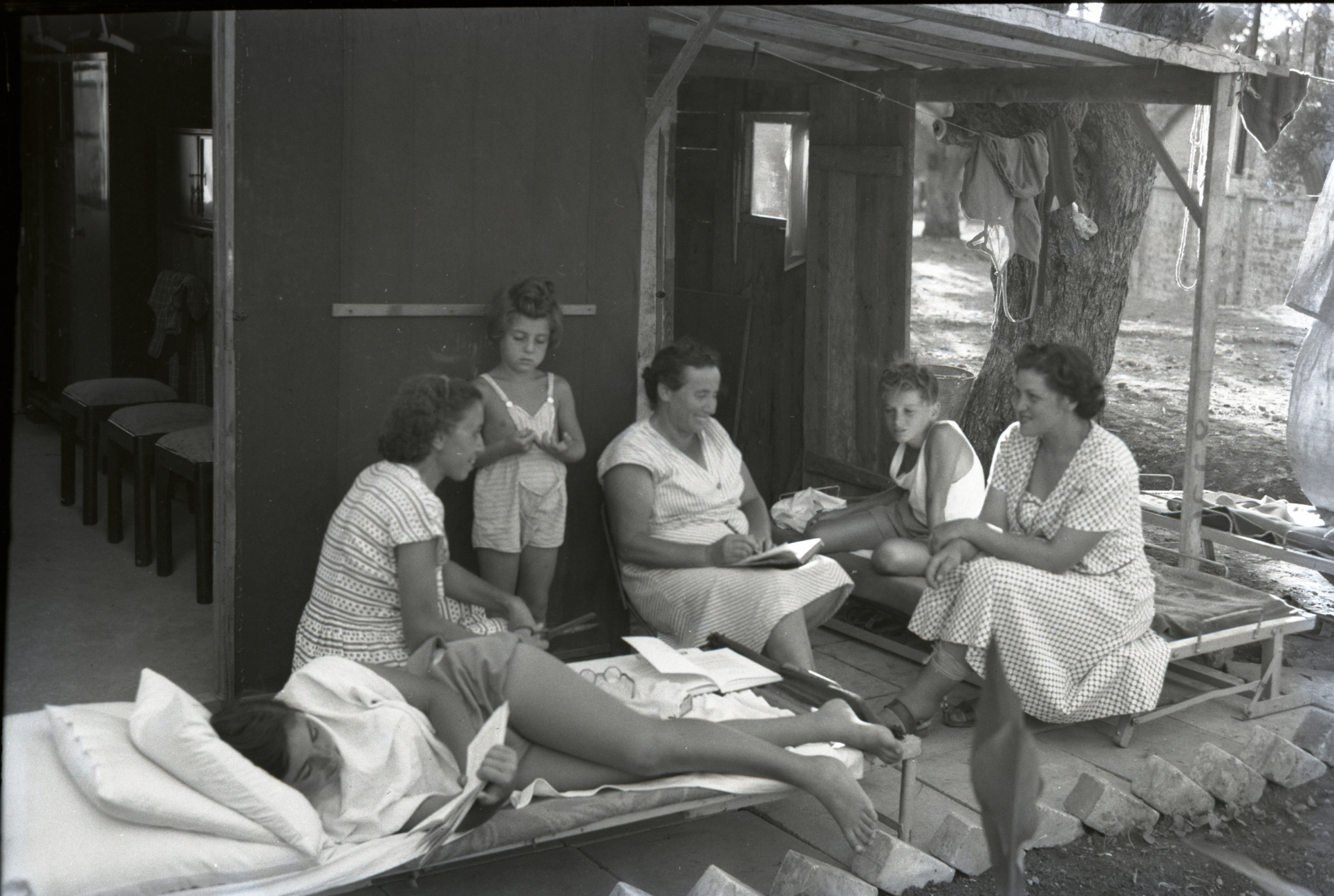
women resting outside a house in Tirat Yehuda

The moshav was established in 1949 by Jewish immigrants from Hungary. Initially, it was located northeast of its present site, in the area which is today Bareket, before moving to its current location in 1951. It was named after the depopulated Palestinian village of al-Tira which it was located near, and the fact that it was in the vicinity of the border of the land of the Tribe of Judah.

In its first years, it was attacked several times by the Palestinian fedayeen, and was a designated border settlement until the 1967 Six-Day War.

== Gallery ==
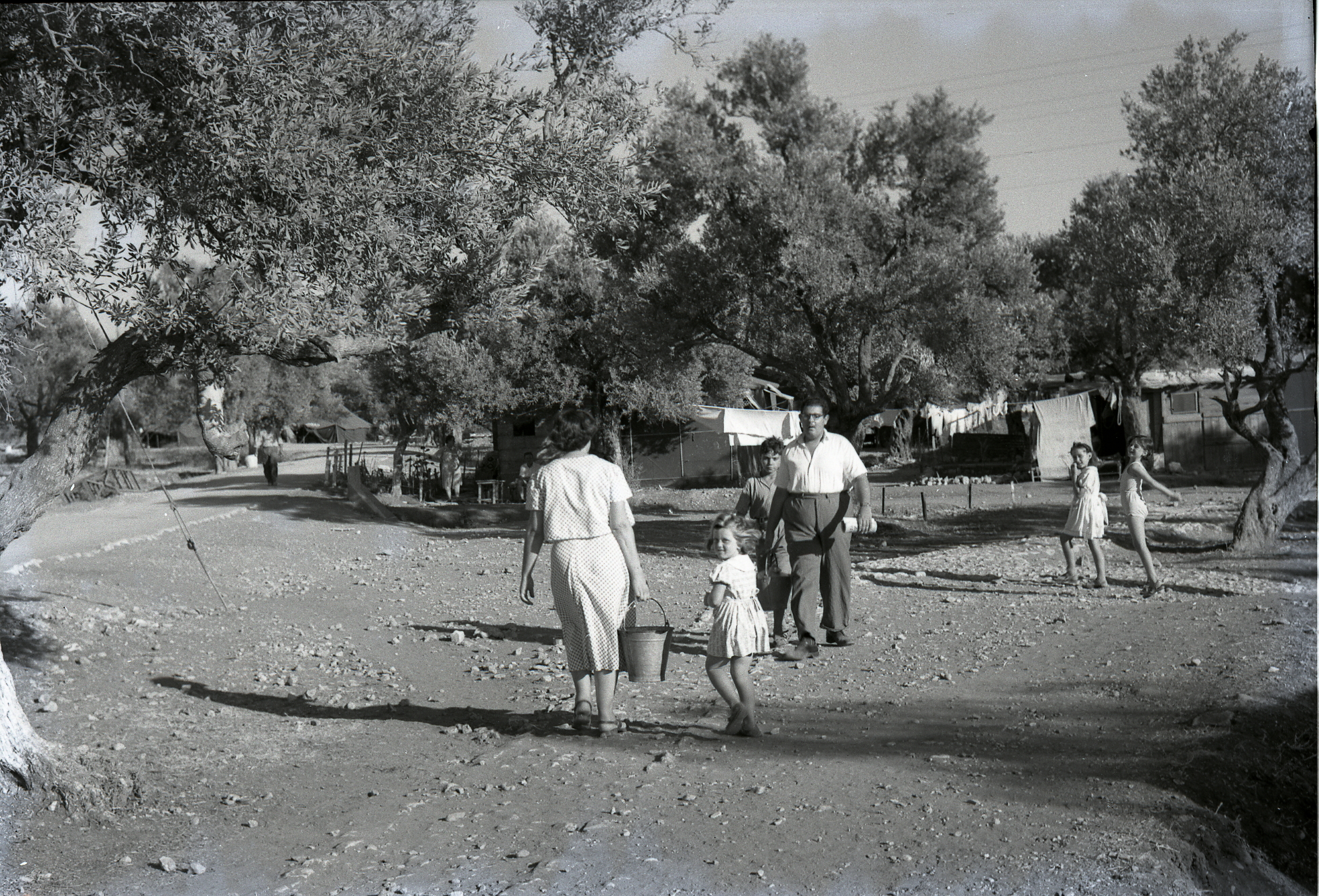
Children playing outside a residential structure

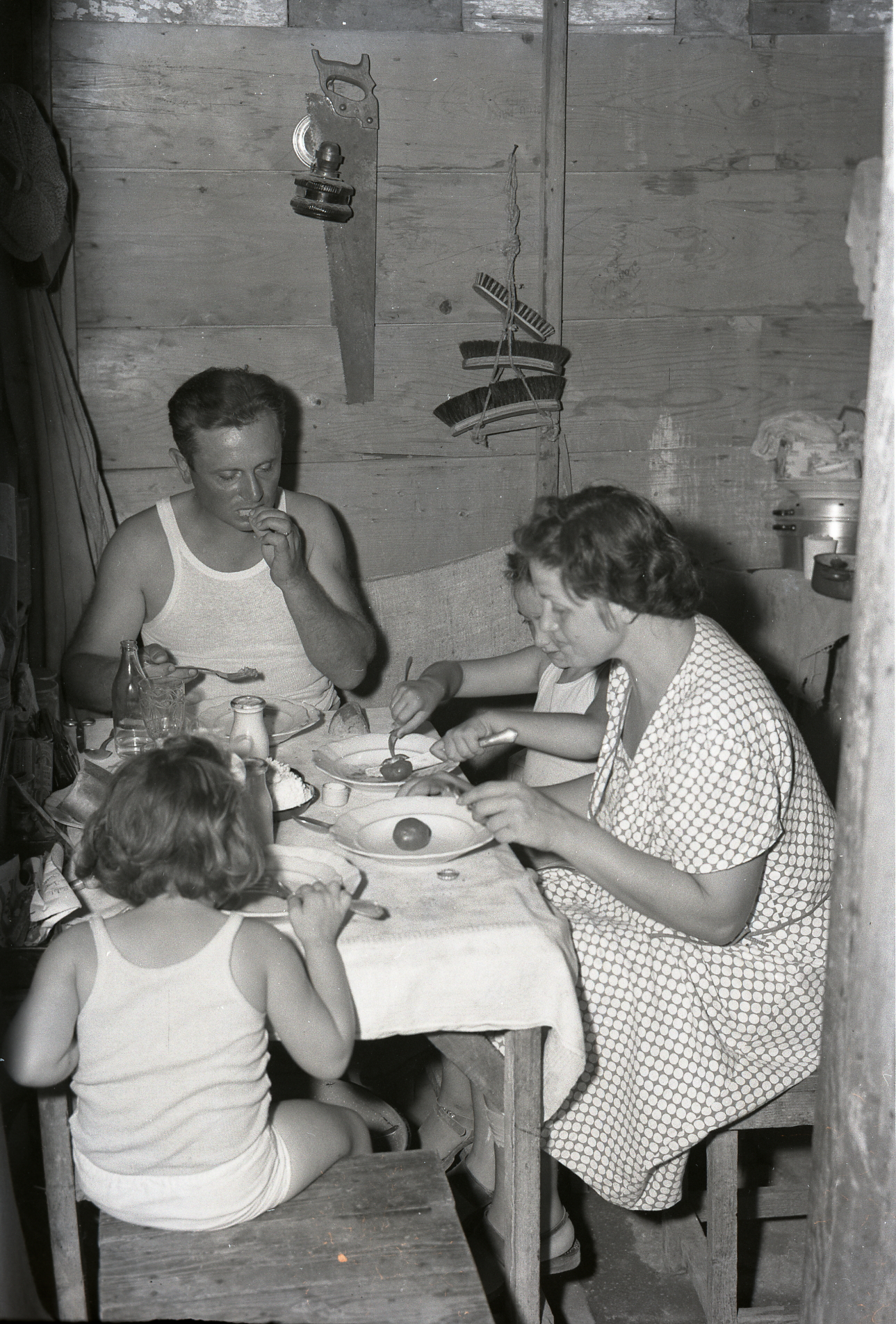
Family meal in Tirat Yehuda

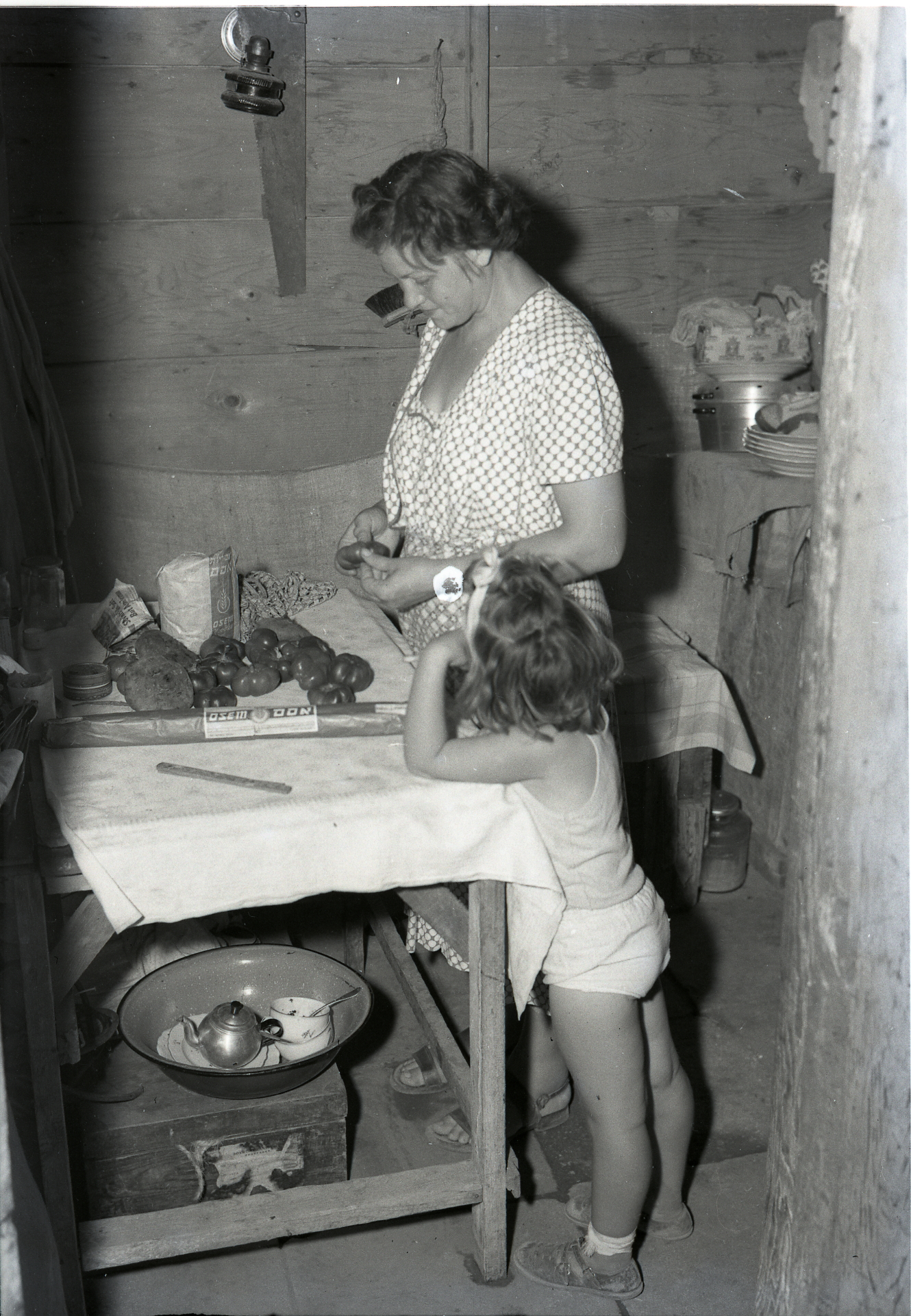
Food preparation in Tirat Yehuda

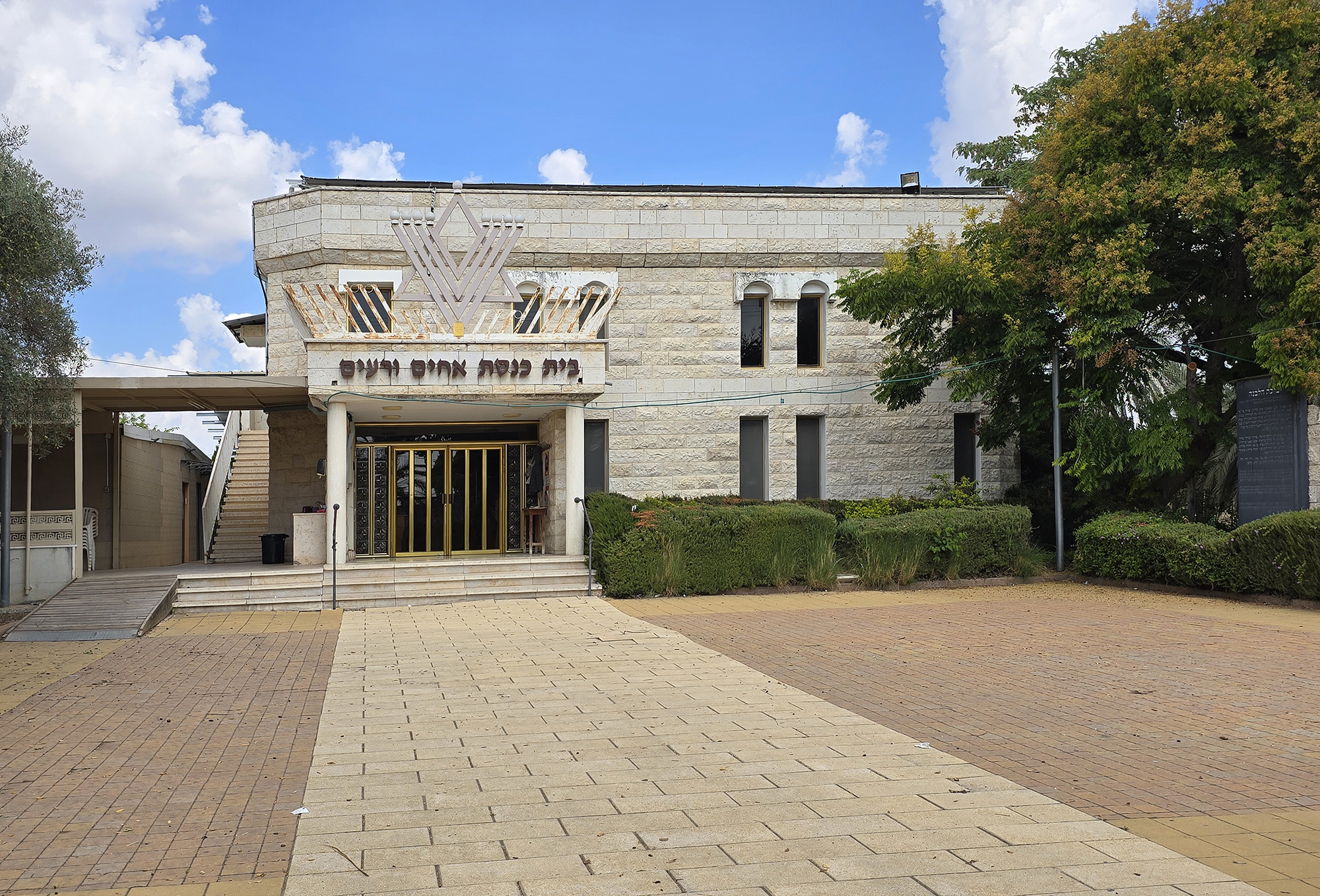
“Brothers and Sisters Synagogue” in Tirat Yehuda

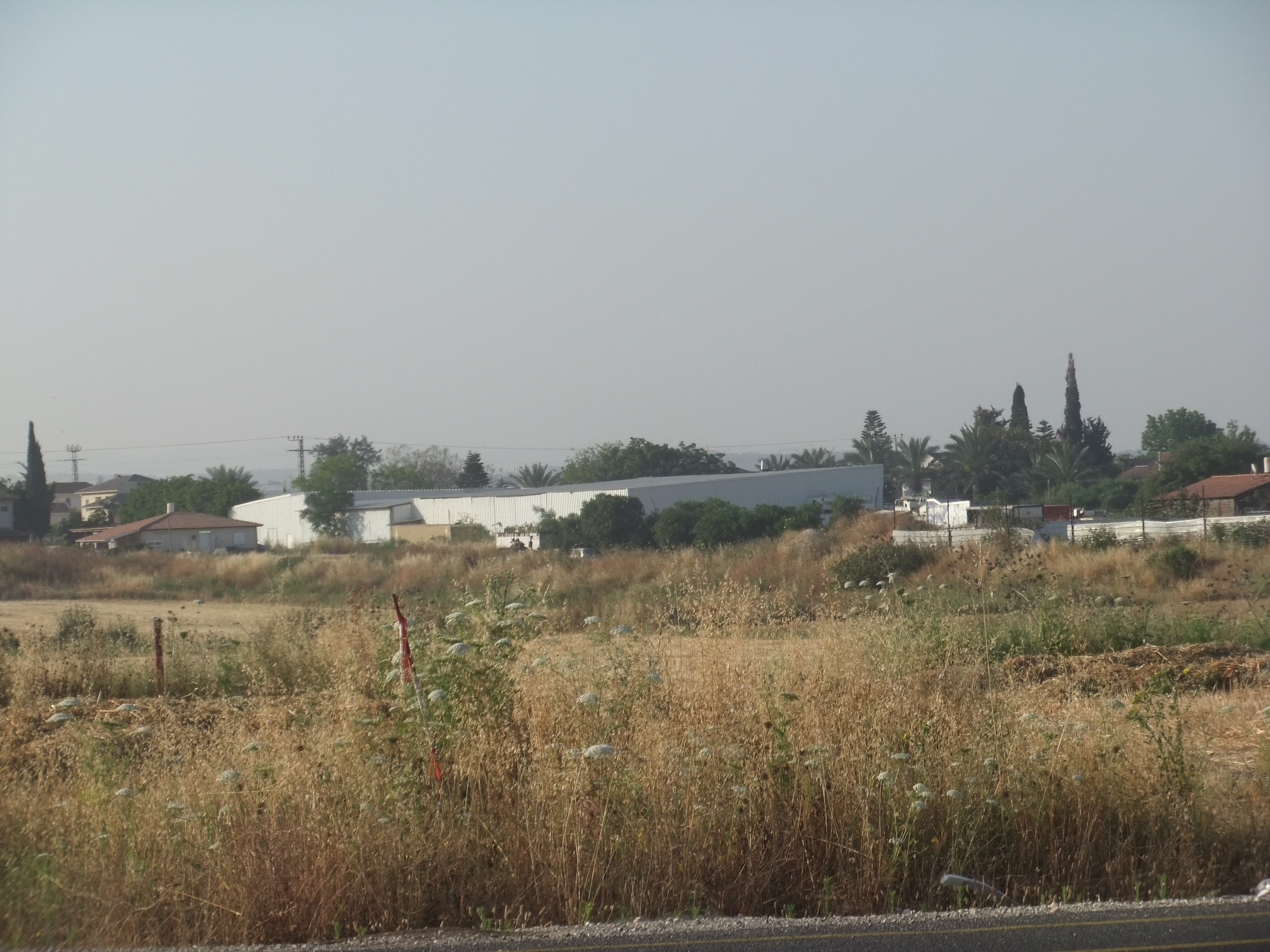
Water tower near Tirat Yehuda

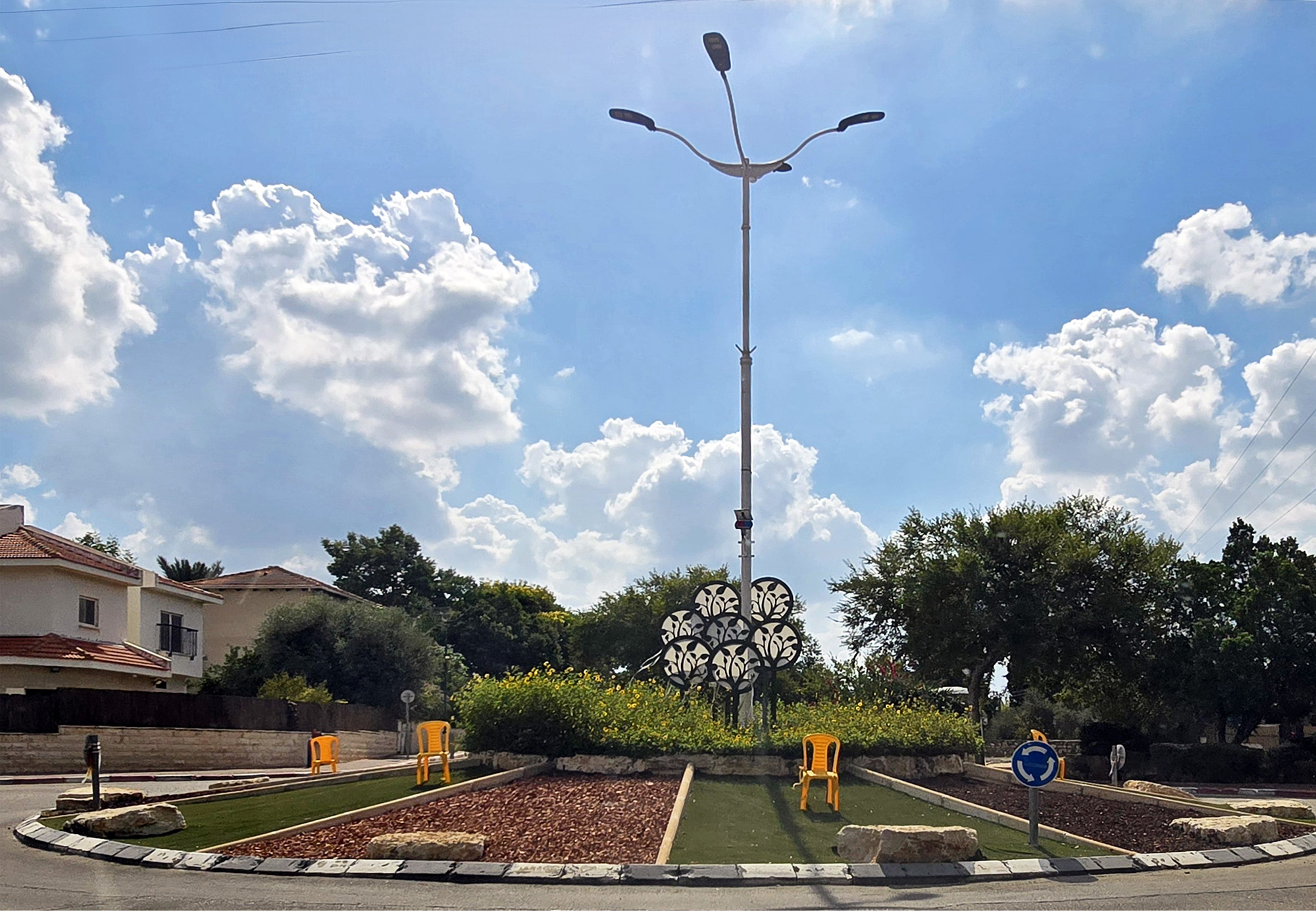
A square at the entrance to Tirat Yehuda

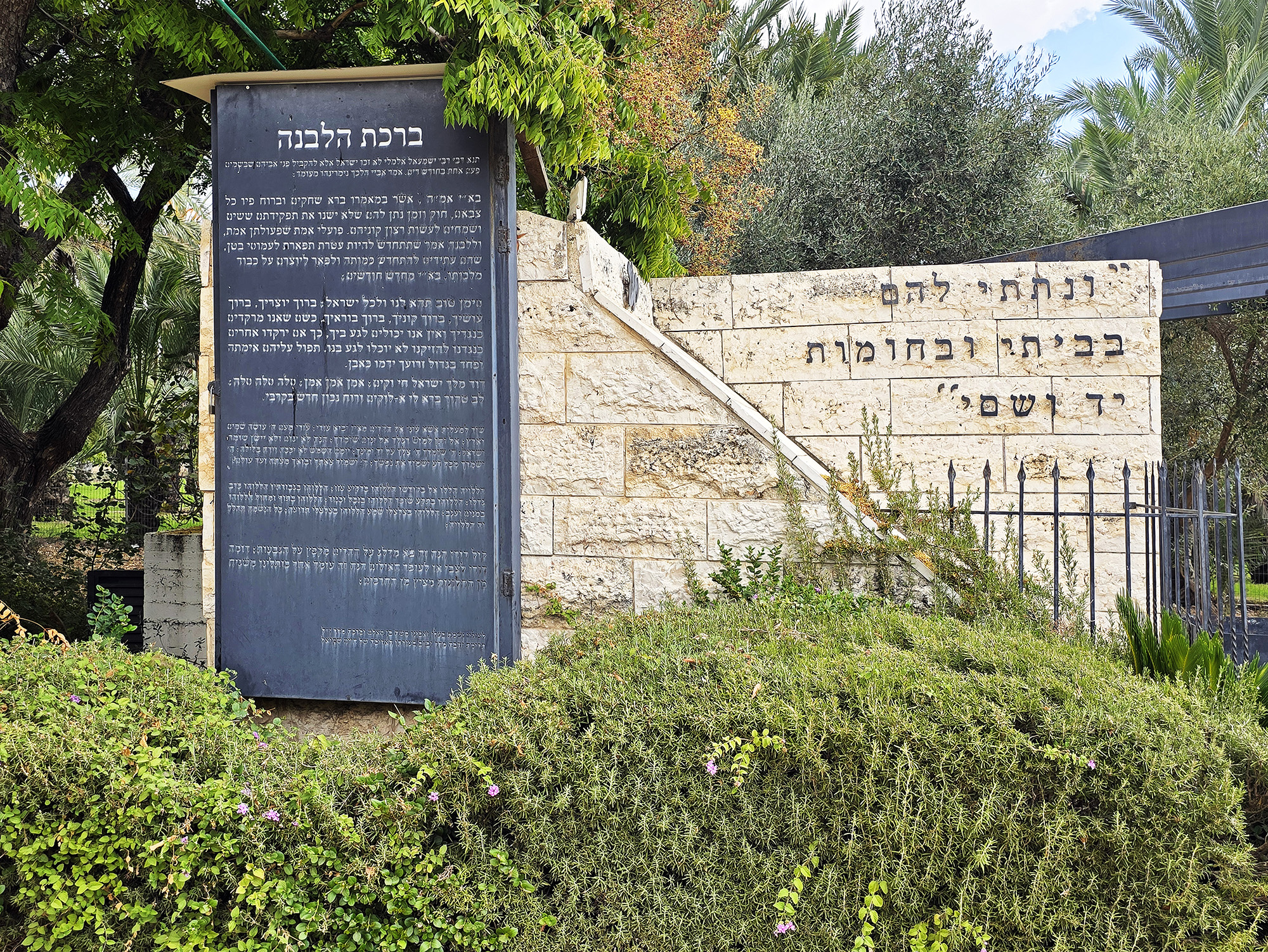
A memorial complex for fallen individuals from Tirat Yehuda

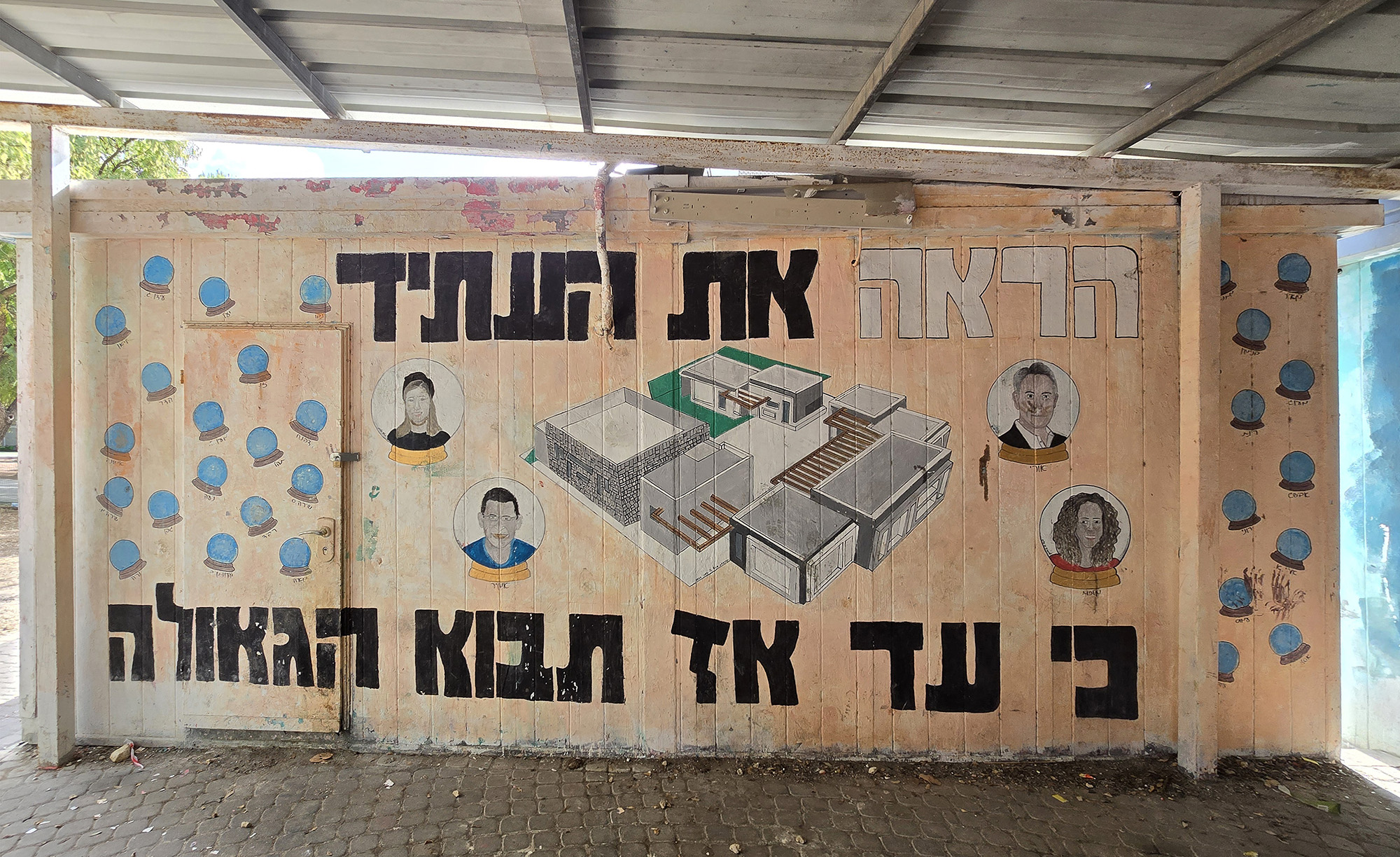
Painting on the wall of a club in Tirat Yehuda
