= Libyan art =

Visual arts and material culture of Libya

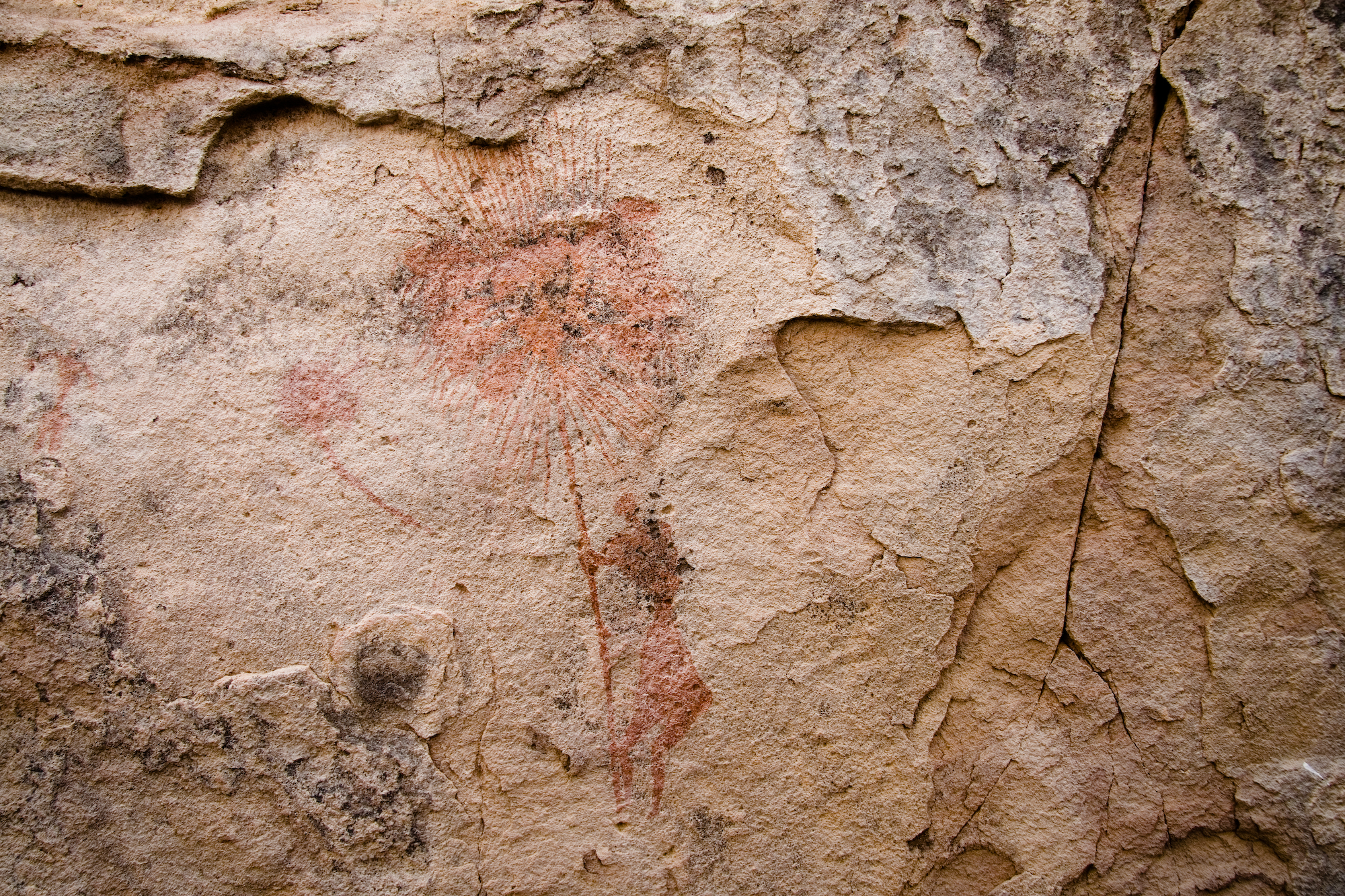
Prehistoric rock paintings in the Tadrart Acacus mountains, depicting animals and human figures

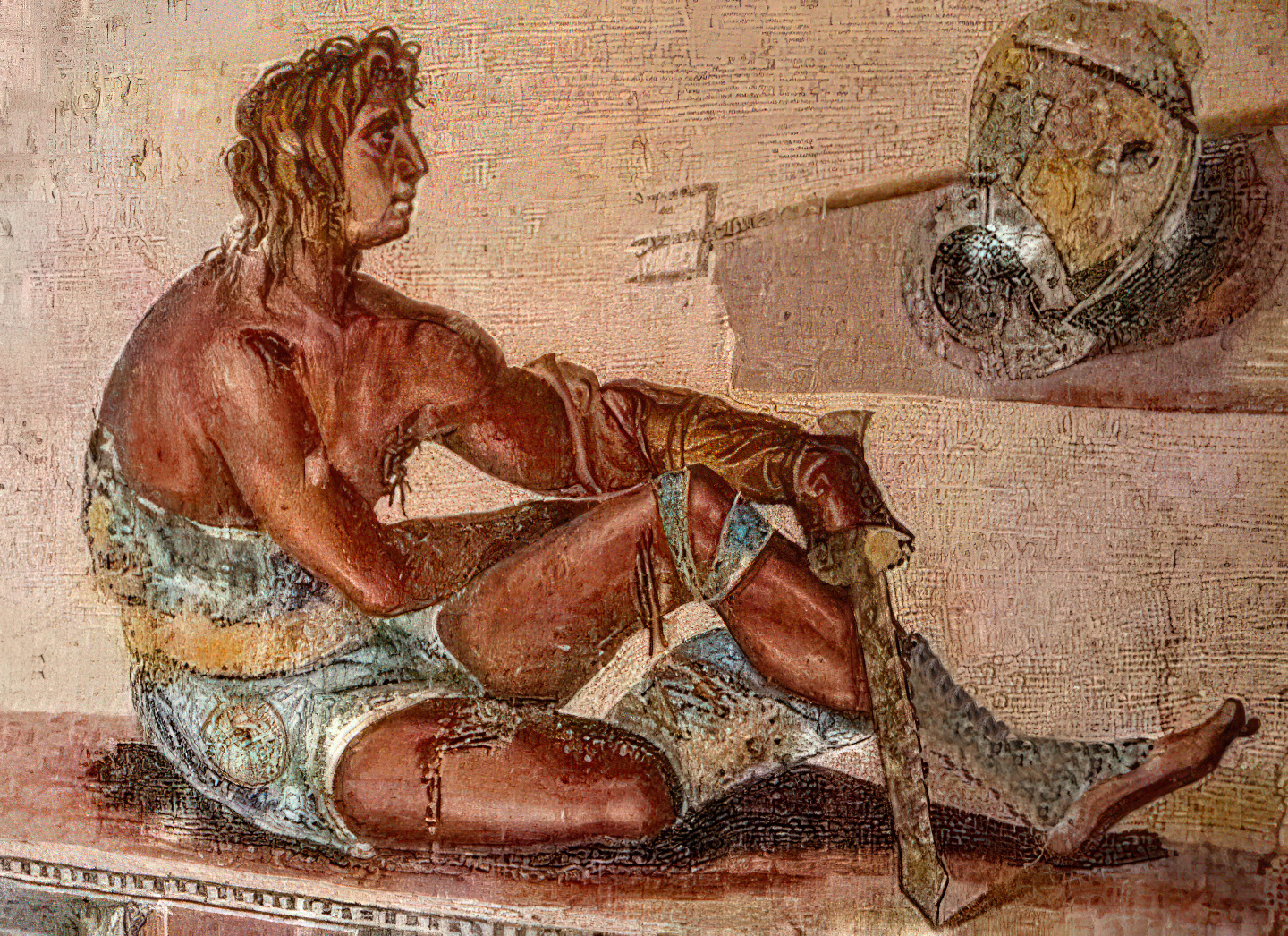
Roman mosaic depicting a retiarius (net-fighter) gladiator, from Leptis Magna, 1st century CE

Libyan art encompasses the visual arts and material culture produced in Libya and by Libyans from prehistory to the present day. It spans the rock art of the Sahara, the Punic, Greek and Roman art of the coastal cities, the Islamic art and architecture of the Ottoman and Karamanli periods, the Amazigh (Berber) and Bedouin traditions of jewellery, textiles and painted interiors, the craftsmanship of Libya's ancient Jewish community, and modern and contemporary painting, calligraphy, sculpture and street art. Libyan art has historically absorbed and reworked influences from the many peoples who have settled or ruled in the region, including Phoenicians, Greeks, Romans, Arabs, Ottoman Turks and Italians, while retaining distinctively Amazigh, Saharan and Islamic decorative traditions.

== Prehistoric rock art ==
Libya contains some of the largest concentrations of prehistoric rock art in the Sahara, concentrated in two main areas: the Tadrart Acacus mountains and the Messak plateau in the country's south-west. The earliest engravings of wild fauna in the Acacus, from the so-called "Wild Fauna Period", may be as old as 12,000 years, and thousands of later paintings and engravings trace changes in climate, subsistence and belief across the Holocene, from a wetter "Green Sahara" populated by giraffes, elephants and crocodiles to the pastoral scenes associated with the spread of cattle-herding from around 8,000 years ago. Systematic study of the region's rock art began with the Italian archaeologist Paolo Graziosi in the late 1930s and was continued by Fabrizio Mori, who published the first scientific accounts of Libyan rock art in the 1960s. Additional major sites of rock engravings are found at Wadi Matkhandoush and Wadi Tidwa. Other rock art recorded in the region is thought to show early wheeled vehicles, supporting classical accounts, including that of Herodotus, describing the peoples of ancient Libya as early users of the chariot.

== Antiquity ==
=== Punic and Greek art ===
On the coast, the Phoenicians and their Carthaginian successors founded trading settlements at Leptis Magna, Sabratha and Oea (modern Tripoli) that formed the region later known as Tripolitania, while Greek colonists from Thera founded Cyrene and the other cities of the Cyrenaican Pentapolis to the east. Excavations at Cyrene have produced an extensive body of Hellenistic and later sculpture, much of it modelled on, or copied from, famous Athenian originals; the collection includes archaic kouros and kore figures, a Sphinx, portrait busts of Ptolemaic queens and Roman emperors, and the "Three Graces" group. Its best-known piece is the so-called Venus of Cyrene, a headless Roman marble copy of a Greek Aphrodite, removed to Italy after its discovery in 1913 and returned to Libya in 2008. Coinage and inscriptions from Leptis Magna combine Punic and Roman iconography, reflecting the city's mixed cultural origins.

=== Roman art ===
Under Roman rule, Tripolitania and Cyrenaica produced some of the finest surviving figurative art of the ancient Mediterranean. The Zliten mosaic, a second-century floor mosaic uncovered near Leptis Magna in 1913, depicts gladiatorial combats, animal hunts and scenes of daily life, and is held in the Archaeological Museum of Tripoli. A group of five wall mosaics discovered by a University of Hamburg team at a bath complex in a Roman villa at Wadi Lebda, near Leptis Magna, and made public in 2005 after being kept confidential to prevent looting, includes a gladiator mosaic that scholars have ranked among the finest surviving examples of Roman representational mosaic art. The city's monumental architecture, including the Arch of Septimius Severus, the Severan Basilica and the harbour complex, was built under the African-born emperor Septimius Severus and is preserved as a World Heritage Site. Later Byzantine-era mosaics survive at sites such as the eastern church of ancient Olbia near Qasr Libya.

== Islamic-era architecture and calligraphy ==
Following the Arab conquest, Libyan visual culture became increasingly shaped by Islamic art, expressed above all through architecture, Arabic calligraphy and geometric ornament rather than figurative imagery. The oasis town of Ghadames, a UNESCO World Heritage Site, is renowned for its multi-storey mud-brick houses, whose whitewashed interiors are decorated by the women of each household with red, black and white painted geometric motifs, hand prints and symbols such as triangles, diamonds, the sun, the palm and the Tuareg cross, alongside wall-mounted mirrors, brasswork and woven rugs used to reflect the limited light entering through a single roof opening.

In Tripoli, the Ottoman period (from 1551) and the subsequent Karamanli dynasty (1711–1835) produced a distinctive tradition of mosque architecture and decoration in the old city. Early Ottoman mosques such as the Sidi Darghut Mosque (c. 1560) and the Atiq Mosque favoured a comparatively restrained style, with simplified carving on stone, marble and timber and unadorned domes and minarets. Mosques of the Karamanli era, including the Ahmed Pasha Karamanli Mosque and the Gurgi Mosque, are more richly decorated, combining Islamic geometric patterning with elements drawn from European ornament; the Gurgi Mosque, built in 1834, has fifteen domes, a green-marble minaret with two balconies, and interior walls and columns of coloured marble and multicoloured tile. Studies of the Karamanli mosques have documented extensive use of Qashani glazed tiles with floral and star motifs at entrances and foundational inscriptions combining decorative calligraphy with dated texts recording the mosques' patrons.

== Amazigh and Bedouin folk art and crafts ==
In keeping with wider Islamic reservations about figural imagery, Libyan folk art has traditionally favoured geometric and stylised ornament over representations of people and animals, expressed through embroidery, weaving, metal engraving, and jewellery worked in leather, silver and beads. Traditional Libyan clothing displays regional and Ottoman-influenced variation, including the embroidered farmla waistcoat and the jerd (or houli), a large wrapped woollen or cotton cloth worn since late antiquity and associated in Libyan tradition with manhood and status. Bridal costume is especially elaborate: the hasira, a white silk wedding dress embroidered with silver and gold thread and worn with a matching veil, is paired with heavy 24-carat gold jewellery, including neck pieces that may reach the waist and wide decorated cuffs, while the pink-striped al-houly al-boudry dress is worn on the Alboudri pre-wedding day, accompanied by silver anklets, belts and a decorative fan.

Silver and gold filigree jewellery is one of Libya's best-documented decorative art forms; a 2022 monograph on the subject traces its history through archaeological finds, travellers' accounts and merchant records, and highlights the historically close ties between the jewellery-making communities of Tripoli and of Djerba in neighbouring Tunisia. Craftsmen in Tripoli's old city (medina) were traditionally trained by Jewish master silversmiths and, from the late 19th century, at the Ottoman-founded School of Arts and Trades; this artisanal tradition was severely disrupted after 1969, when Muammar Gaddafi's government abolished private enterprise and dispersed the medina's workshops, and has been the subject of post-2011 revival efforts such as the Libyan Academy for Traditional Gold and Silver Crafts in Tripoli.

Painting depicting the interior of a synagogue in Tripoli, Libya

== Jewish art and material culture ==
Libya was home to one of the Jewish diaspora's oldest communities, with a continuous presence traced back roughly 2,300 years, and Libyan Jews developed a distinctive artistic and craft tradition, centred on Tripoli, that survived until the community's dispersal in the mid-20th century.

=== Silversmithing and jewellery ===
Jewish artisans were historically the principal masters of gold- and silversmithing in Tripoli's medina, training generations of craftsmen (Jewish and, from the 19th century onward, Arab) in the filigree techniques used across Libyan bridal and ceremonial jewellery. Historians of the craft have noted particularly close relations between the Jewish silversmithing communities of Tripoli and of Djerba, two centres separated by later colonial borders but linked by shared techniques and family networks.

=== Synagogues ===
Tripoli's old city once contained around thirty-three synagogues. The Dar Bishi Synagogue (Sla Dar Bishi), built in 1770 and rebuilt in 1922–23, was designed by the Italian-Jewish architect Umberto Di Segni, son of the educator Vittorio Di Segni, and modelled on Rome's Tempio Maggiore; it is the last of Tripoli's historic synagogue buildings still standing, though it has been closed and deteriorating since the Jewish community's departure in 1967, and in 2011 the Libyan-Jewish activist David Gerbi began an unfinished restoration effort. The Synagogue and Yeshiva Dar Seroussi, built in the second half of the 18th century under Ottoman rule, was one of the medina's most important Jewish communal buildings, combining a Talmud Torah for younger pupils with a yeshiva for advanced study; it escaped the demolition of Tripoli's other synagogues under Gaddafi and today houses a small museum of Jewish ritual objects salvaged from destroyed homes and synagogues. The Slat Abn Shaif Synagogue, associated with the tomb of a venerated rabbi, became a pilgrimage site on Lag BaOmer; it was burned in 1868, rebuilt in 1870 on the order of the Ottoman sultan, destroyed again by fire in 1912 and rebuilt once more, before being demolished in the 1980s, and its architectural model was repeated in a synagogue built in Benghazi. In the mountain town of Yefren, southwest of Tripoli, the Qabliya (Kabliya) Synagogue had six arches and six windows evoking the Star of David and, according to local tradition, incorporated stones said to have been carried from the Second Temple by early exiles. Almost all of Libya's synagogues were demolished or converted to other uses after the mass emigration of the Jewish community between 1949 and 1967; the former Dar Bishi building near the Arch of Marcus Aurelius has more recently functioned as an art gallery.

=== Museum and diaspora collections ===
Following the community's dispersal, most surviving Libyan-Jewish ritual and decorative objects passed into diaspora collections. The Museum of Libyan Jews (Heritage Center of Libyan Jewry) in Or Yehuda, Israel, houses the principal such collection, including a reconstruction of a Jewish quarter (hara) market, a hall commemorating victims of the anti-Jewish pogroms of 1945, 1948 and 1967, and a gallery of work by contemporary artists from the Libyan-Jewish community. The community, one of the oldest in the diaspora with roughly 2,300 years of continuous presence before its dispersal, also produced figures such as the Libyan-born artist and musician Herbert Pagani. The ownership and repatriation of Libyan-Jewish artefacts remain contested: diaspora organisations such as the Union of Libyan Jews have objected to Libyan government requests for a US import-restriction agreement covering all pre-1911 Libyan cultural property, arguing that such an agreement would cover objects and religious items taken from Jewish communities that were forced to leave the country.

== Modern and contemporary art ==
=== Painting, sculpture and calligraphy ===
Twentieth-century Libyan visual art developed alongside the country's transition from Italian colonial rule to independence and, after 1969, to the Gaddafi-era state. Mahmoud Jalal (1911–1975), a Libyan-born painter, sculptor and medallist who later worked mainly in Syria, is regarded as an early modernist figure connected to Libya. The best-known Libyan artist of the later 20th and early 21st centuries was the calligrapher Ali Omar Ermes (1945–2021), born in Zliten and later based in London, whose large-scale paintings incorporate single Arabic letters or verses of poetry and prose set against richly textured grounds; his work, informed by six decades of engagement with Arabic calligraphy and Islamic thought, entered the collections of institutions including the British Museum, the Ashmolean Museum, Tate Britain, the Smithsonian Institution and the National Art Gallery of Malaysia. Under Gaddafi's government (1969–2011), independent artistic expression was tightly restricted and many Libyan artists went into exile; state-sanctioned murals of the Gaddafi period celebrated the ruling "First of September Revolution", in contrast to the independent street art that followed his fall.

=== Street art and the 2011 revolution ===
The 2011 revolution against Gaddafi's government produced a wave of graffiti and mural-making in Tripoli and other cities, as Libyans used public walls to satirise Gaddafi (frequently depicted as a rat or as a small, ridiculous figure) and to commemorate the "martyrs" of the uprising, after decades in which all Libyan media had been state-controlled. The self-taught graffiti artist Aimen Ajhani, known as Elbhohly, began spraying protest imagery in Tripoli in 2011, including a stencilled "Fatima's Hand" motif, and later co-founded the Art of Expression collective, which combined street art with music and dance events to support families affected by the war; his work repeatedly led to his arrest under both the Gaddafi government and afterward.

=== Contemporary artists ===
Since 2011, a new generation of Libyan artists has continued to work with the country's archaeology, mythology and recent history. Shefa Salem (born 1996 in Benghazi), an architecture graduate of the University of Benghazi, produces large-scale realist oil paintings and murals reimagining Libyan heritage and archaeology, and was named one of Middle East Eye's "Five Emerging Artists to Watch" in 2021; her series "The Identity Project" draws on archaeological research and local mythology. Other Libyan-born or Libyan-descended artists working internationally include the photographer Arwa Abouon (1982–2020), of Amazigh descent, who worked in Canada; the painter Shadi Alzaqzouq (born 1981), based in France; and the multidisciplinary artist Nour Jaouda.

== Museums and collections ==
Roman and Punic-era material is housed principally in the Archaeological Museum of Tripoli, the on-site Leptis Magna Museum at Al-Khums, and the Cyrene Antiquity Museum at Shahhat, the last of which holds roughly two hundred statues and sculptural fragments recovered from the ancient city, including several carved from imported Thasian marble. The Museum of Libya, housed in Tripoli's former royal palace, presents Islamic-era and modern material through immersive, multimedia display techniques. Libyan-Jewish material culture is preserved mainly outside Libya, above all at the Museum of Libyan Jews in Or Yehuda, Israel.

== See also ==
- Culture of Libya
- Traditional Libyan clothing
- List of Libyan artists
- History of the Jews in Libya
- Leptis Magna
