= Dahmash =

Village in central Israel

Coordinates: 31.943°N 34.867°E

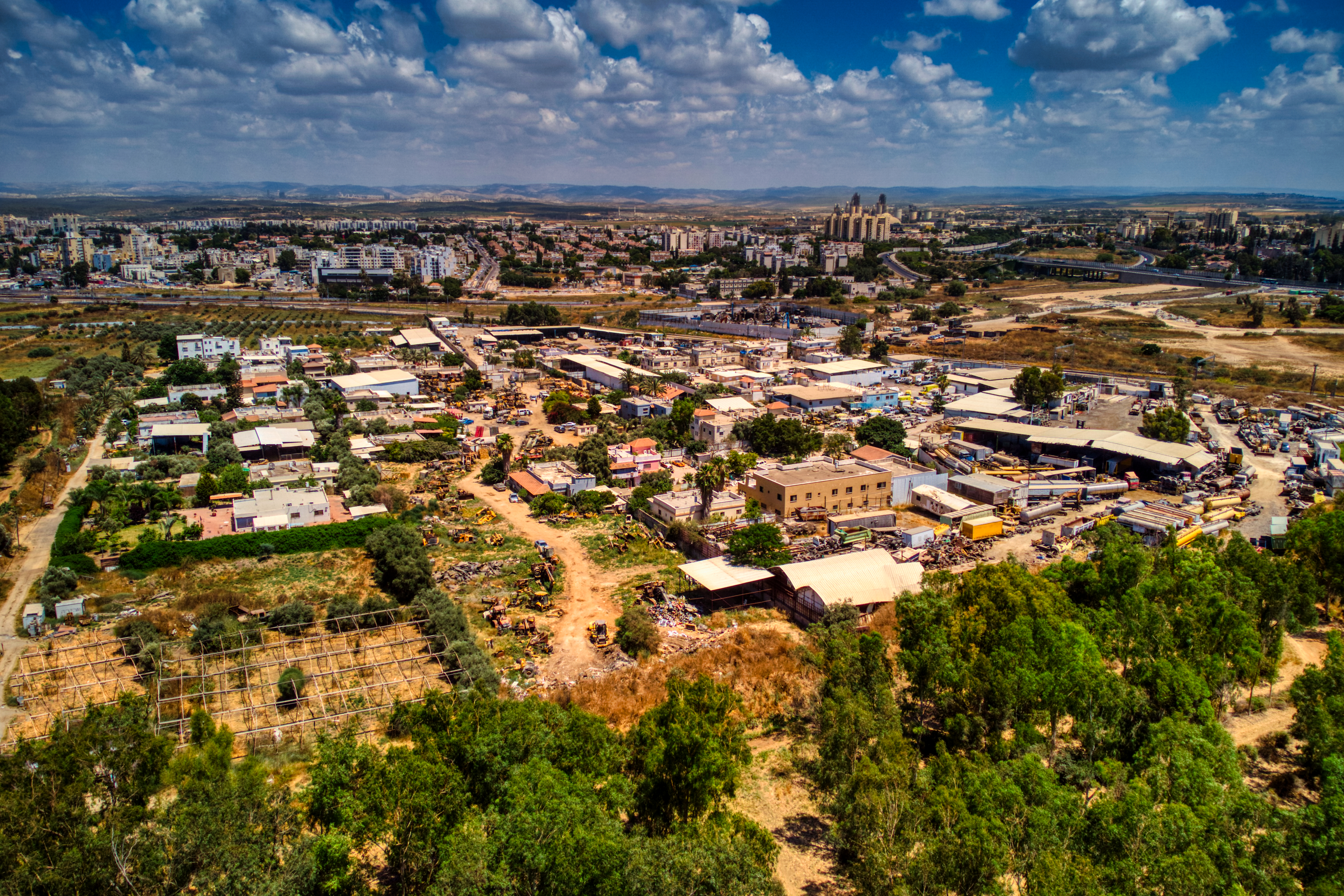
Dahmash from above

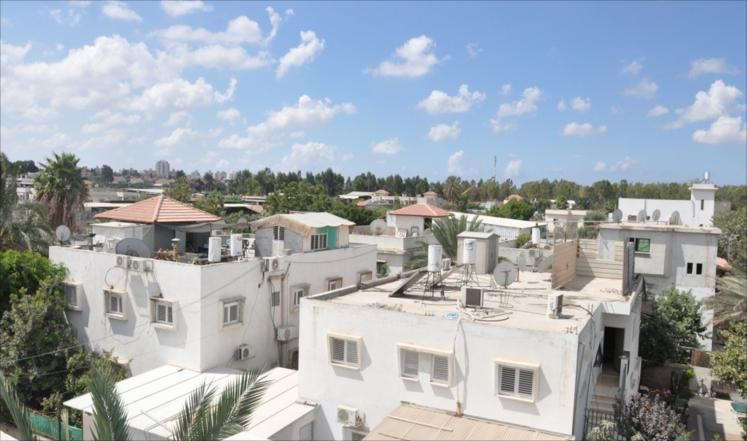
Dahmash

Dahmash (Arabic: دهمش, Hebrew: דהמש) is an Arab village in Israel situated 15 kilometers from Tel Aviv-Yafo in an agricultural area between Lod, Ramla and Nir Tzvi. It has been inhabited since 1951, and has a population of 600 people, all Arab citizens of Israel, living in approximately 70 homes. Almost all of the houses were built since the late 1990s. The village is unrecognized by the Israeli authorities.

== History and status ==
The 70 homes of Dahmash have been built on land granted to their owners by the Israeli authorities in the 1950s as a compensation for lands they lost during the 1948 Arab-Israeli War. The land is zoned as agricultural land, not as residential construction. Due to the growing population, the inhabitants of Dahmash have built houses on them. Most of the homes were built starting in the late 1990s. Since these lands have been classified by the Israeli authorities as agricultural lands, and not residential construction, the village is officially unrecognized.

Because it is unrecognized, the village has no public services such as schools, paved roads, public transportation, sewage and drainage system, or health facilities. The inhabitants have no addresses in the village and are registered as living in Ramla or other nearby towns. The village has also no green space or outdoor playground. In 2006, an organization built a playground, but it was declared illegal and demolished by the authorities.

On April 15, 2015, three buildings of Dahmash were destroyed by the Israeli authorities.

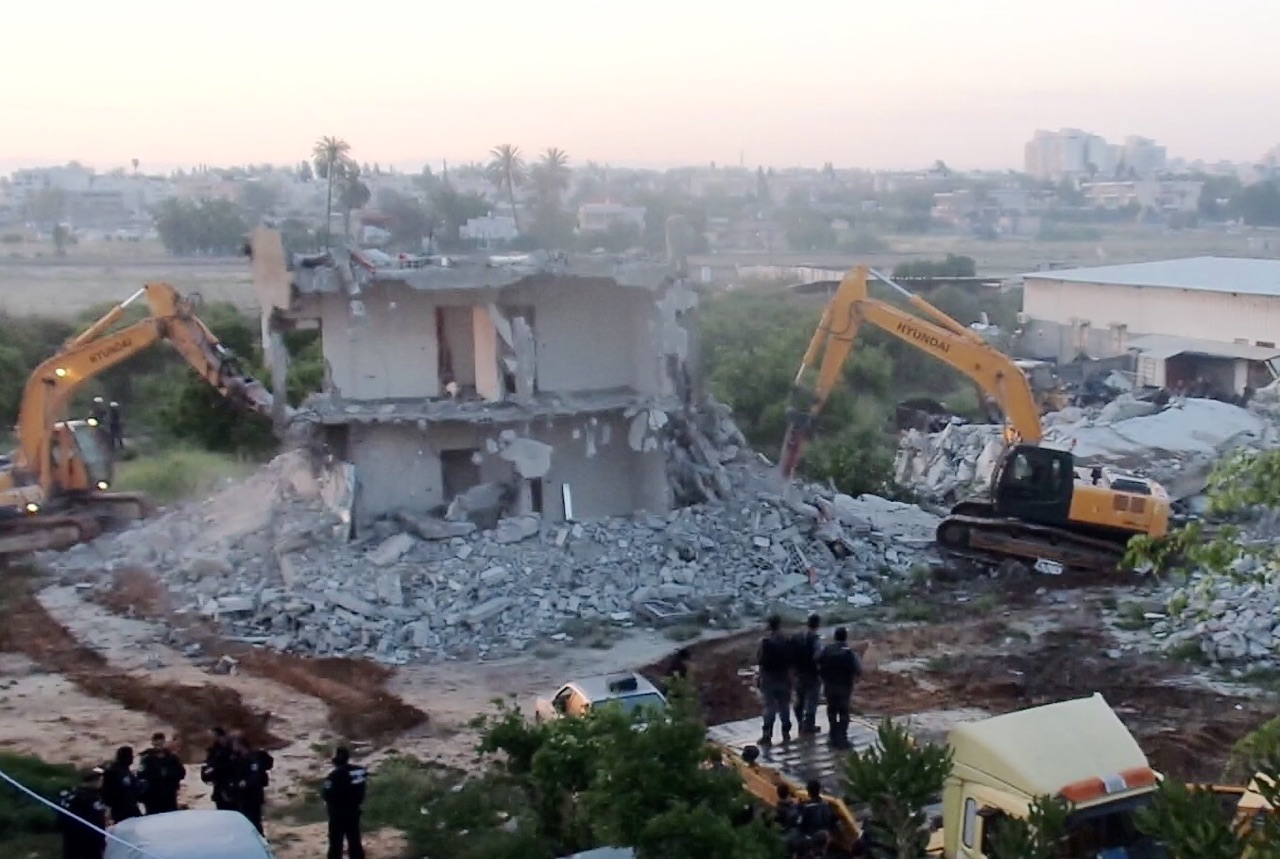
House demolition in Dahamash April 2015

== Political issues ==
Human Rights Watch have denounced the situation of Dahmash and called for its recognition by the Israeli authorities. The statute of Dahmash prevents its residents from having access to the same services as official Israeli settlements, according to Human Rights Watch and other political activists. Consequently, almost every one of the 70 houses is "illegal", and many have been under threat of demolition.

== Geography ==
It is an agricultural land of 600 hectares (1,500 acres). The main road entering Dahmash is the road going to Ramla.

== Administration ==
There is an elected chairman named M. Arafat Ismayl. There is no administrative council. Dahmash is under the control of the Sdot Dan Regional Council.

== Demographics ==
Dahmash has a population of 600 inhabitants in 70 houses. Originally, they were all Palestinian refugees from the 1948 Arab-Israeli War. The culture of Dahmash is Palestinian with Bedouin influences. The majority of the population of Dahmash is Muslim, from the Sunni branch.

== Economy ==
Dahmash village is composed of houses and of one shop. The inhabitants used to work in agriculture until the 1980s. Then they started working in small businesses.

== Education ==
There is no school. The children go to schools in Ramla and Lod. Human Rights Watch mentioned the problem of education in their Dahmash in a 2010 report.
