= Zetan =

Zetan may refer to:

- A fictional character in the film Circle of Iron, played by Christopher Lee
- Zeitan, a village in central Israel

== See also ==
- The Greek letter zeta
- Zetang
- Aliens in the Fallout universe
