= Higher education in Libya =

Higher education in Libya has faced challenges from different factors. Indeed, Libyan higher education is modernized compared to countries which have poor higher institutes. Libyan higher education enrollment is free at any stages, with enrollment rate is increasingly high at universities. In 1980s and 1990s, Libyan higher education was hindered due to foreign language obstruction.

== Overview ==
Higher education includes general and specialized universities, polytechnics and teacher training institution. Recent studies suggested that there is a significant gap in higher education level in Libya, due to the policy of suppressing foreign language abroad. Libya has 29 universities. Higher education has been improved and evolved to governmental and institutional stages as well as in society, despite facing some obstacles. Libyan universities face challenges of poor learning and skill method, lack of efficiency and teacher qualifications and poor understanding of e-technologies provision, with no professionals and developments in culture.

Libya had no higher institution during the Italian rule. The first higher institution was the University of Benghazi, which is high ranking and established after its independence. The first Arts and Education was inaugurated, and UNESCO aided to open faculties of science, agriculture, commerce, economics, law and medicine in Tripoli between 1955-1969. According to official statically source, around 50-60% students graduated from intermediate vocational centers, a program that awards Intermediate Training Diploma.

=== After the 2011 revolution ===
From the 2011 revolution, Libya has suffered from educational crisis which universities expanded without assessing the quality standard – also impacted the higher education scrutiny. The number of public universities grew from 13 in 2014 to 26 in 2021.

After 2011, most Libyans agreed that the level of higher education of the country should be improved.
