= Hemed =

Moshav in central Israel

Hemed: חמ״ד (Hebrew)
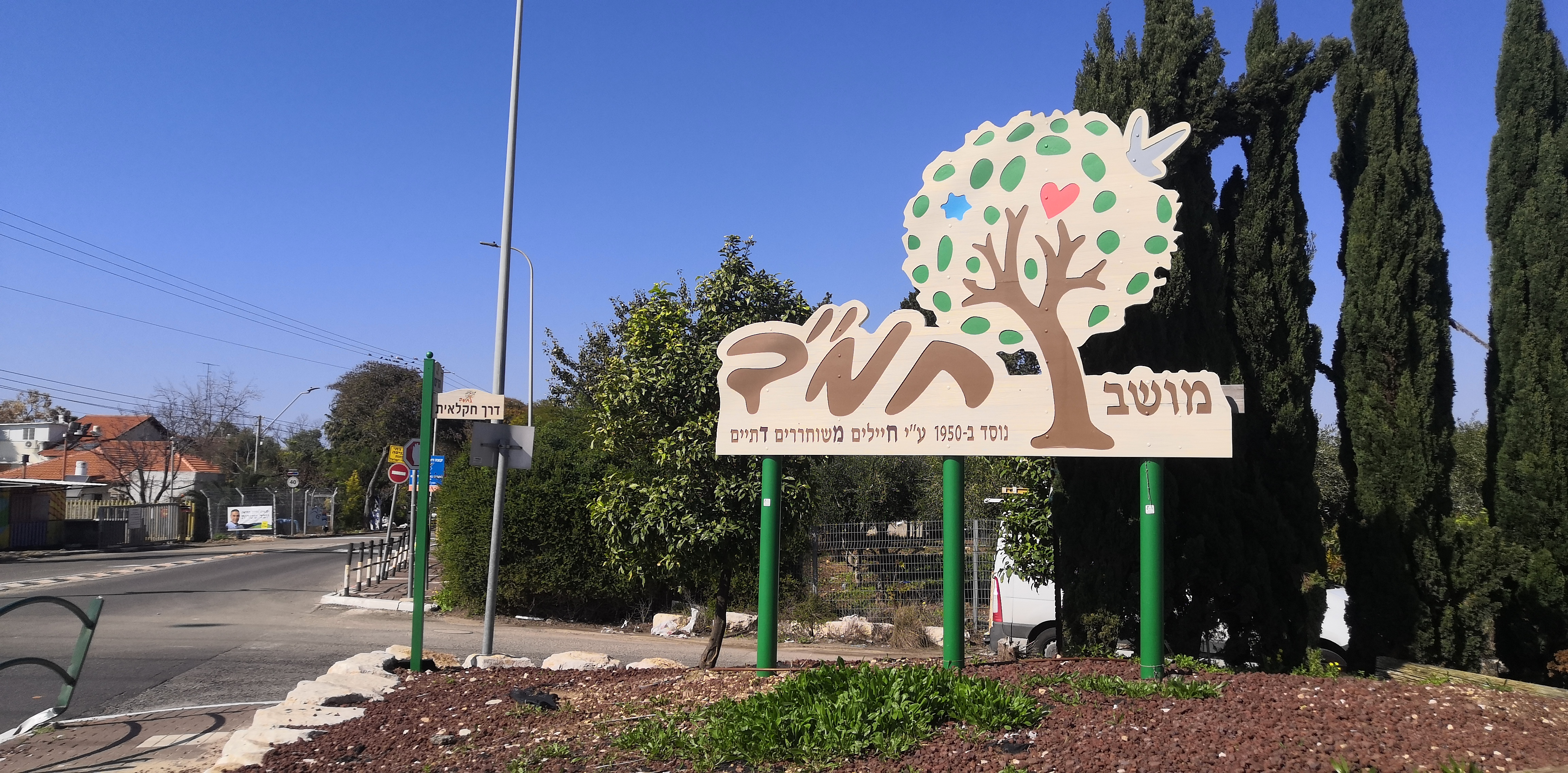
- Entrance to moshav Hemed

- Location within Central Israel Location within Israel
- Coordinates: 32°1′6″N 34°50′29″E
- Country: Israel
- District: Central
- Subdistrict: Ramla
- Council: Sdot Dan
- Affiliation: Hapoel HaMizrachi
- Founded: 1950
- Founder: Demobbed soldiers
- Population (2024): 1,485
- Website: hemed.net

Hemed (Hebrew: חמ״ד, lit. 'Grace') is a national religious moshav in the Central District of Israel. Located near Or Yehuda, it falls under the jurisdiction of Sdot Dan Regional Council. In 2024 it had a population of 1,485.

== History ==
During the 18th and 19th centuries, the area belonged to the Nahiyeh (sub-district) of Lod that encompassed the area of the present-day city of Modi'in-Maccabim-Re'ut in the south to the present-day city of El'ad in the north, and from the foothills in the east, through the Lod Valley to the outskirts of Jaffa in the west. This area was home to thousands of inhabitants in about 20 villages, who had at their disposal tens of thousands of hectares of prime agricultural land.

The village was founded in 1950 by demobilised soldiers from the Israel Defense Forces who were immigrants from Czechoslovakia, Poland and Romania. Its name is an acronym for Hayilim Meshuhrarim Datiyim (Hebrew: חֲייִלִים מְשֻׁוחְרֲרִים דָּתִיִּים, lit. Demobilised Religious Soldiers). The residents initially worked in agriculture, but today much of the moshav's land is rented out for warehouses and industrial buildings.
