= Slat Bushaeff =

Former Orthodox synagogue in Zliten, Libya

- Hebrew: בית הכנסת צלאת בן שאיף; Arabic: كنيس صلاة ابن شيف
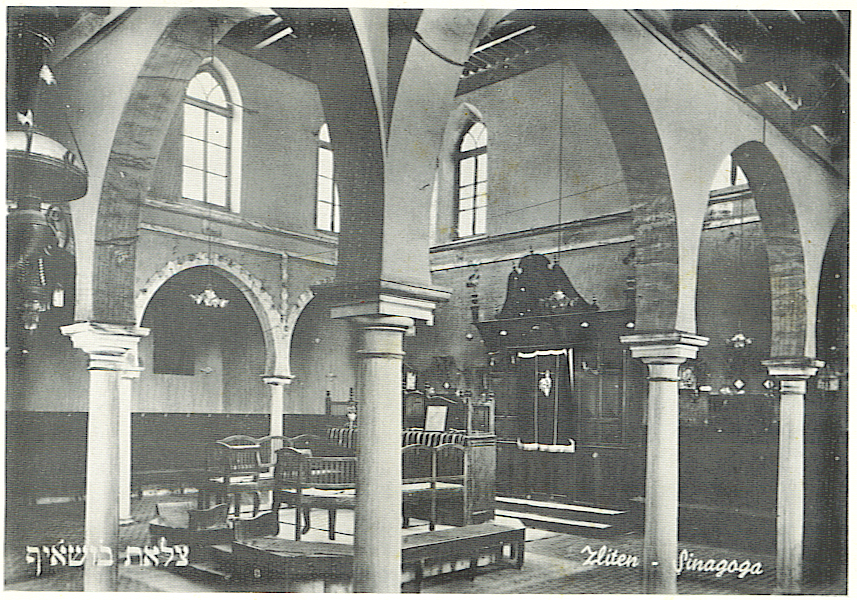
- The former synagogue, before World War II

Religion
- Affiliation: Orthodox Judaism (former)
- Rite: Nusach Sefard
- Ecclesiastical or organisational status: Synagogue
- Status: Destroyed

Location
- Location: Zliten, Murqub
- Country: Libya

Architecture
- Type: Synagogue architecture
- Completed: c. 1060
- Demolished: 1980s

Slat Bushaeff (Hebrew: צלאת בושאייף; Arabic: كنيس صلاة ابن شيف) is a former Orthodox Jewish congregation and synagogue, that was located in Zliten, in the district of Murqub, Libya. The historic synagogue was completed in c. 1060 and became a Lag Ba'omer pilgrimage site for Libyan Jews. The synagogue was demolished during the 1980s.

== History ==
During the Ottoman rule, the building was expanded and became a place of pilgrimage and study of the Zohar. The synagogue was burned in 1868 by disgruntled Muslims of his growing fame and rebuilt in 1870 by the Pasha of Tripoli by order of the Ottoman sultan. Another fire, this time accidentally, destroyed the synagogue in 1912, when Tripoli has recently been under Italian rule. It was rebuilt shortly afterwards. A synagogue in Benghazi was built on the same model.

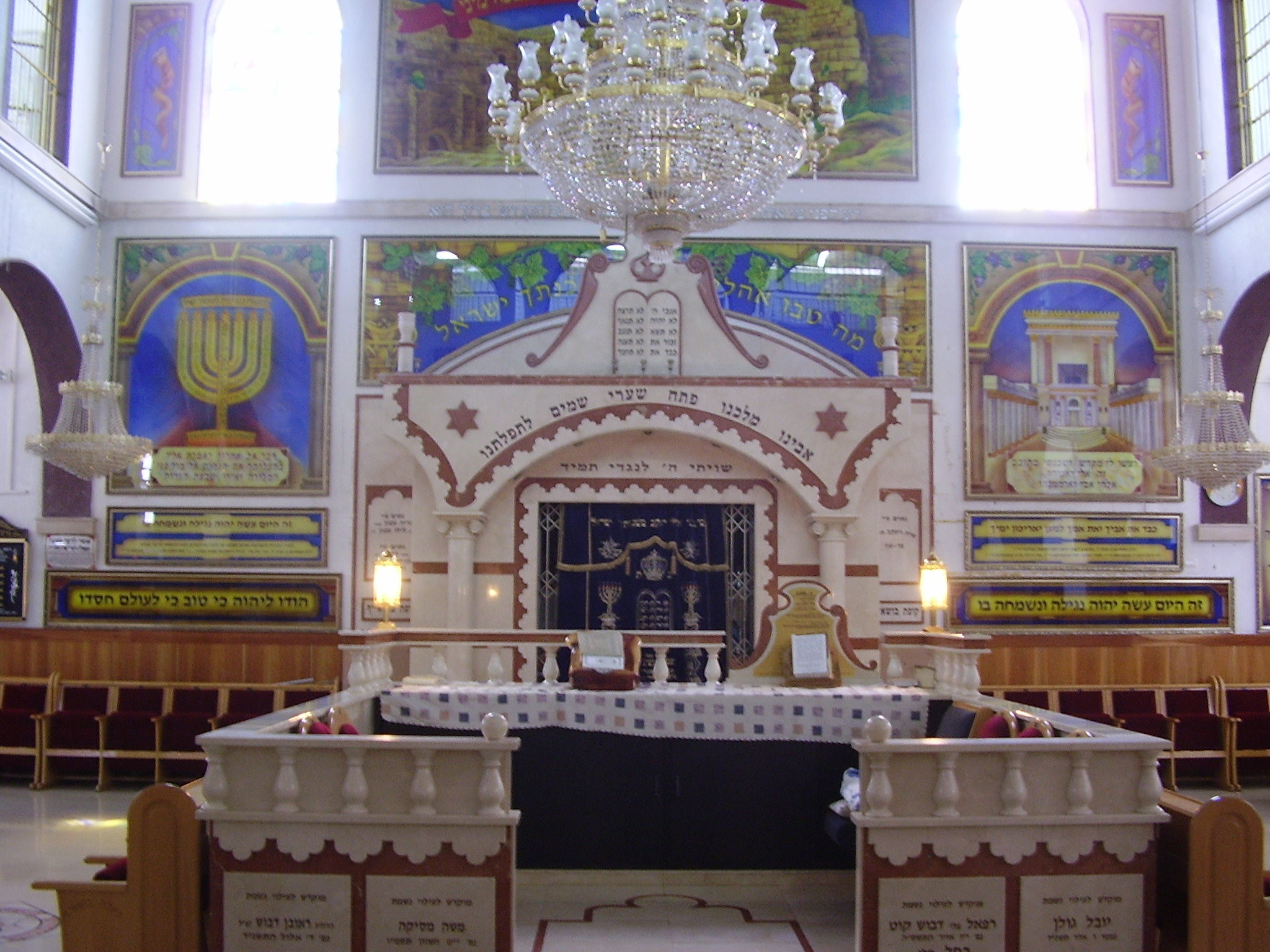
Inside the reconstructed Bushayef Synagogue in Zeitan, Israel

After the mass exodus of Jews from Libya between 1949 and 1951, Libyan migrants in Israel built a replica of the synagogue in Zeitan, a city they founded near Lod.

The Zliten synagogue remained intact until the 1980s, when it was destroyed, possibly under the orders of Muammar Gaddafi, and replaced with an apartment complex.

== See also ==
- History of the Jews in Libya
- Jewish exodus from Libya
- List of synagogues in Libya
