= Traditional Libyan clothing =

Traditional Libyan clothing encompasses the heritage garments worn by Libyans throughout history. These styles vary significantly based on geographical, social, and historical factors, and reflect the influences of the civilizations that have inhabited the region. Although daily use has declined in modern times, traditional attire remains highly significant during formal and social occasions as a symbol of national heritage, characterized by unique designs with roots stretching back thousands of years.

Attire differs primarily between men and women, with distinct regional variations across coastal, mountainous, and desert areas. These variations are also evident among Libya's major cultural groups, including Arabs, Amazigh (Arabic: أمازيغ), Tuareg (Arabic: طوارق), and Toubou (Arabic: تبو).

== Historical overview ==
Libyan traditional dress has deep historical roots; ancient Egyptian temple inscriptions depict similar garments worn by ancient Libyans. The Greek historian Herodotus also described the clothing of Libyan women in the 5th century BCE as decorated leather robes.

Over the centuries, Libyan attire was influenced by various civilizations, most notably the Ottoman Empire, which is clearly visible in embroidered pieces such as the Farmla (Arabic: فرملة). Despite the challenges posed by modernity, traditional dress has recently seen a strong resurgence as a symbol of pride in national identity.

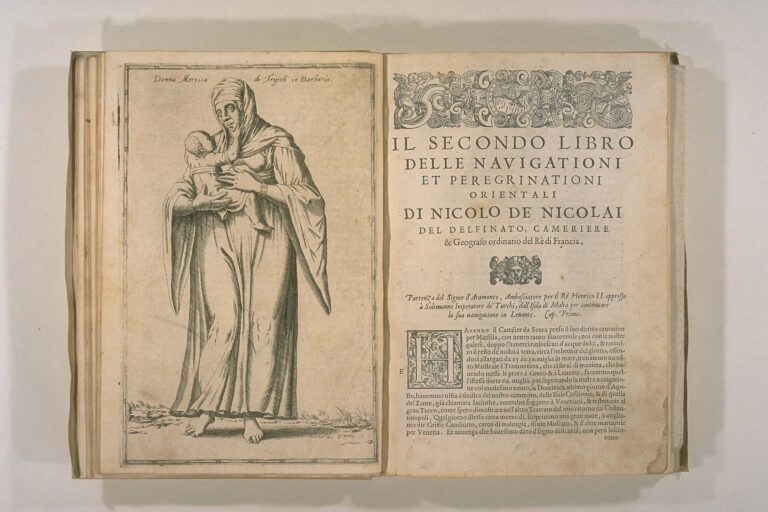
A Libyan woman from Tripoli in the 16th century, based on a painting by French traveler Nicolas de Nicolay.

In the mid-16th century, French traveler Nicolas de Nicolay painted a Libyan woman from Tripoli carrying her infant. This painting is one of the earliest records documenting traditional attire in Libya prior to the expansion of Ottoman influence.

== Men's traditional attire ==
Men's traditional dress is characterized by simplicity and elegance, designed to be practical for Libya's diverse environments.

=== Jerd (Barracan) ===
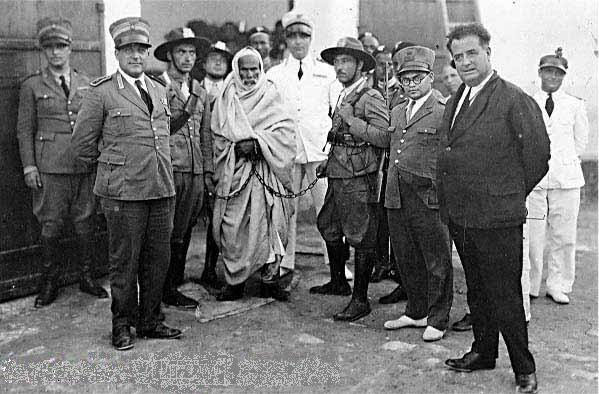
Omar Mukhtar wearing a jerd.

The jerd (Arabic: جرد), also known as the Houli (Arabic: حولي), is a prominent traditional garment that has maintained a presence in North Africa since late antiquity. It is a large wool or cotton cloth, approximately 6 meters long, wrapped around the body. It typically comes in two colors: white for celebrations and brown or beige for daily use. It is considered a symbol of manhood and social status.

Researchers note that the jerd was worn by locals in Tripolitania, Cyrenaica, and Fezzan during the Roman Empire. Some Roman emperors of Libyan origin, such as Septimius Severus, born in Leptis Magna, were depicted in statues or paintings wearing it or styles influenced by it.

=== Farmla and sadriya ===
The farmla (Arabic: فرملة) is a vest heavily embroidered with silver or gold threads, worn over the shirt known as souria (Arabic: سورية). The sadriya (Arabic: صدرية) is a similar but less embroidered vest used for semi-formal occasions.

=== Complementary men's pieces ===
- Sarwal: Baggy trousers made of cotton or linen, tied at the waist with a "Tikka".
- Souria: Cotton shirt worn underneath the farmla.
- Zaboun (Arabic: زبون): a formal kaftan-like garment worn over the souria.
- Shanna (Arabic: شنة): A felt cap, usually dark red.
- Imama (Arabic: عمامة): turban.
- Balgha: soft slippers
- Kantra: durable shoes

== Women's traditional attire ==
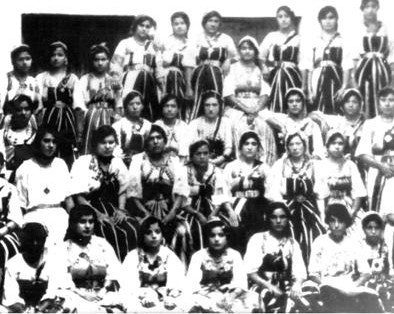
Libyan girls wearing the "Houli" in Tripoli, 1930s.

=== Houli and rida ===
The houli (Arabic: حولي) is the primary wrap for Libyan women, made of fine fabrics like silk and secured with a "Khallal" pin. The rida (Arabic: رداء) is a simpler daily version.

=== Badla kabira ===
The badla kabira (Arabic: البدلة الكبيرة), or "large suit", is the formal bridal attire of Tripoli, consisting of silk layers, embroidery, and massive gold ornaments.

=== Farashiya ===
Two women talking in the market wearing the Farashiya – Tripoli, 1972.

The farashiya (Arabic: فراشية) is a large silk or cotton wrap covering the entire body. The practice of "tumbayk" involves covering the face leaving only one eye visible. Ancient historical records such as Herodotus noted that Greeks adopted body-covering garments from Libyan women.

=== Additional women's pieces ===
- Jelwa: A purple bridal gown with silver embroidery.
- Bakhnuq: An embroidered, colored overgarment.
- Abrouq: A decorative headscarf, approximately 4 meters long.
- Kurdia: A sleeveless velvet vest embroidered with silver known as talleek (Arabic: تليك), historically linked to Kurds during the Ottoman era.

== Amazigh and Tuareg attire ==
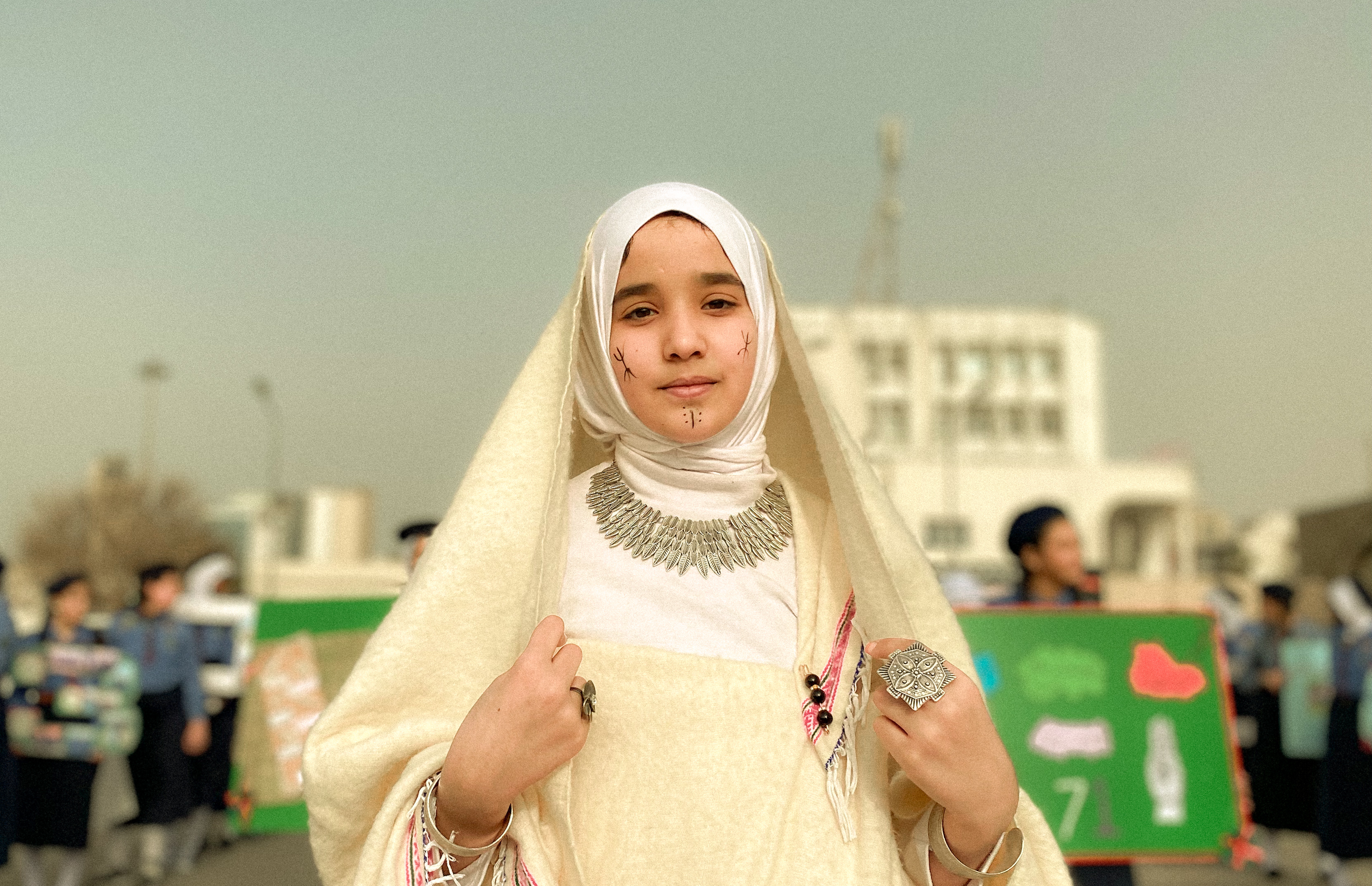
An Amazigh girl in traditional dress.

Amazigh women wear the talaba (Arabic: تلابا). Tuareg men wear the veil known as tagelmust (Arabic: تلغلموست).

== Libyan Jewish attire ==
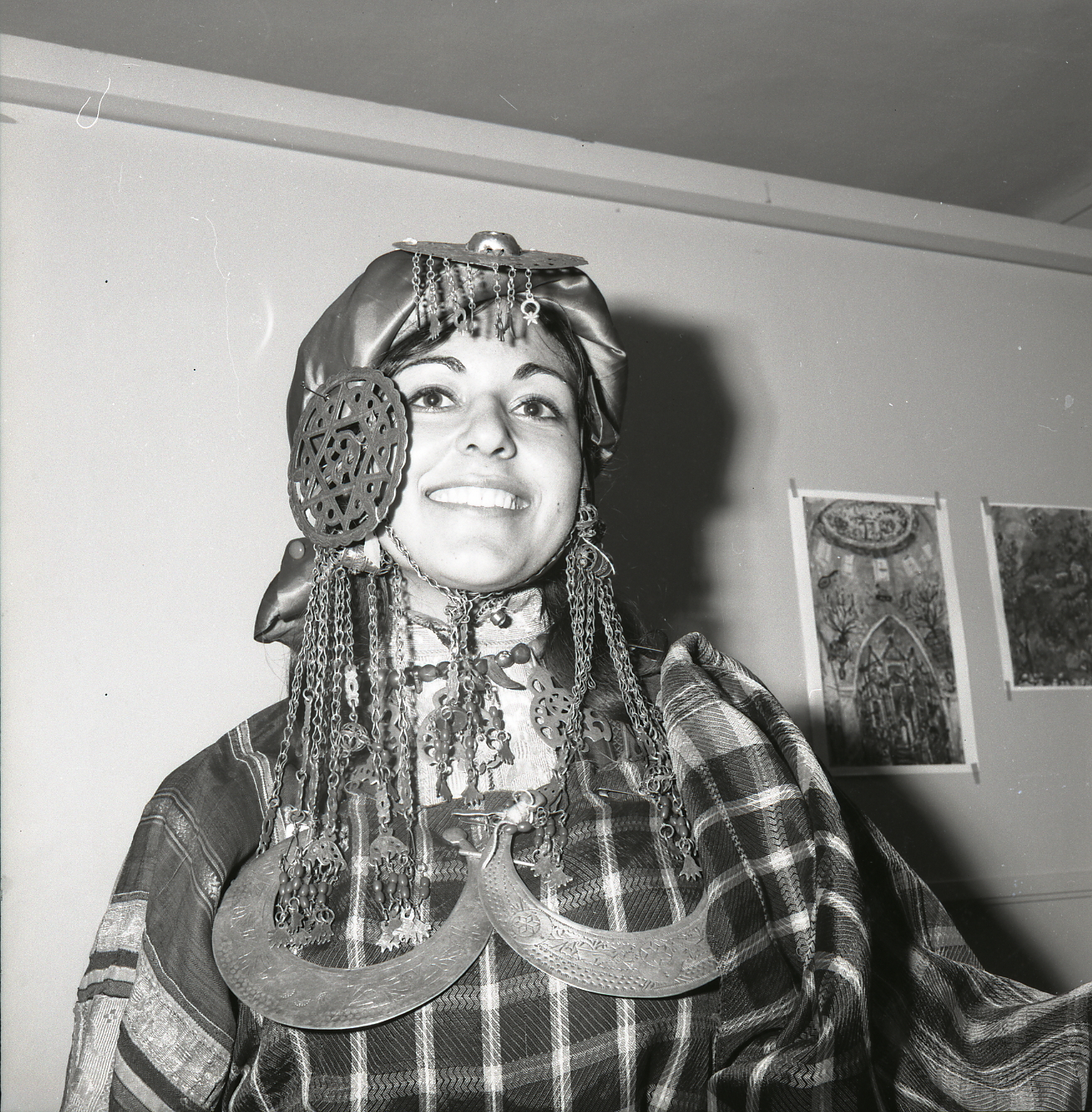
A Jewish bride from Tripoli in the "Kiswa Kabira."

Libyan Jews had distinct traditional attire. The kiswa kabira (Arabic: الكسوة الكبيرة) was a luxurious bridal ensemble. Men's clothing was similar to the general population, though historical Ottoman rules sometimes dictated colors like black for turbans.

== Jewelry and craftsmanship ==
Traditional jewelry involves silver (blessings) and gold (wealth). Key pieces include the Khallal pin, Dabalij (bracelets), and the Khannaq necklace (amber and coral). Craft centers include Tripoli (silk), Ghadames (leather), and Misrata (wool). Despite modern competition, efforts continue to preserve these crafts.

== Gallery ==
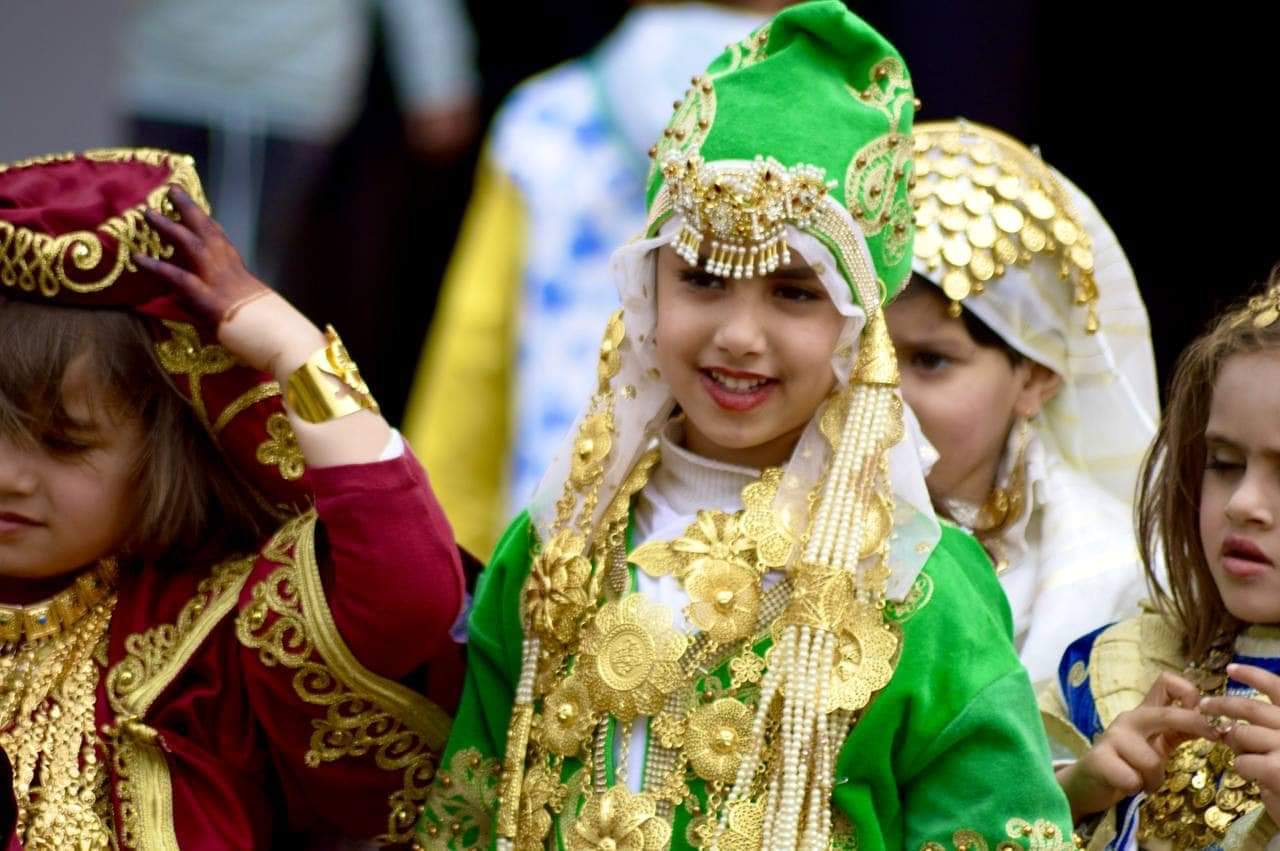

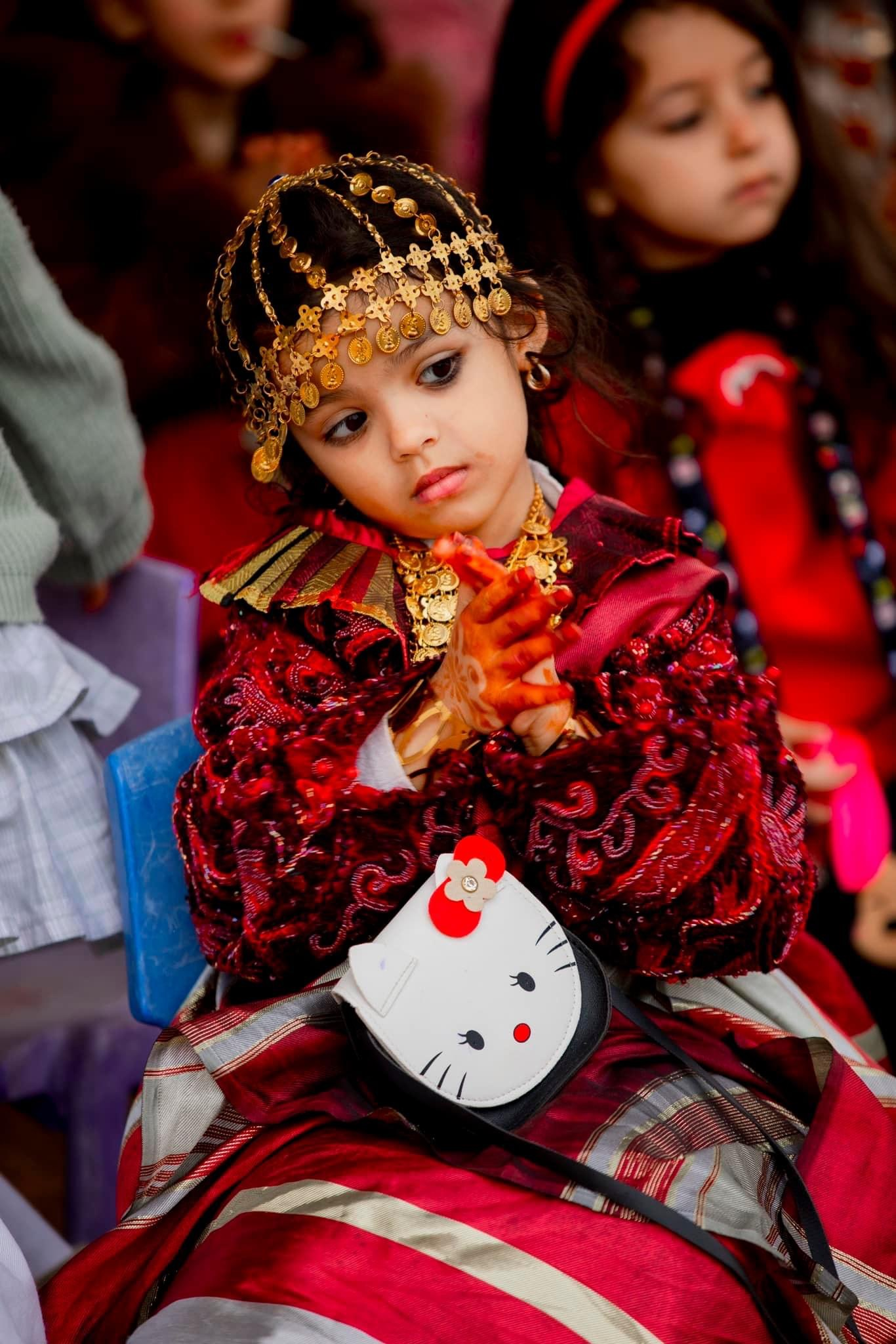

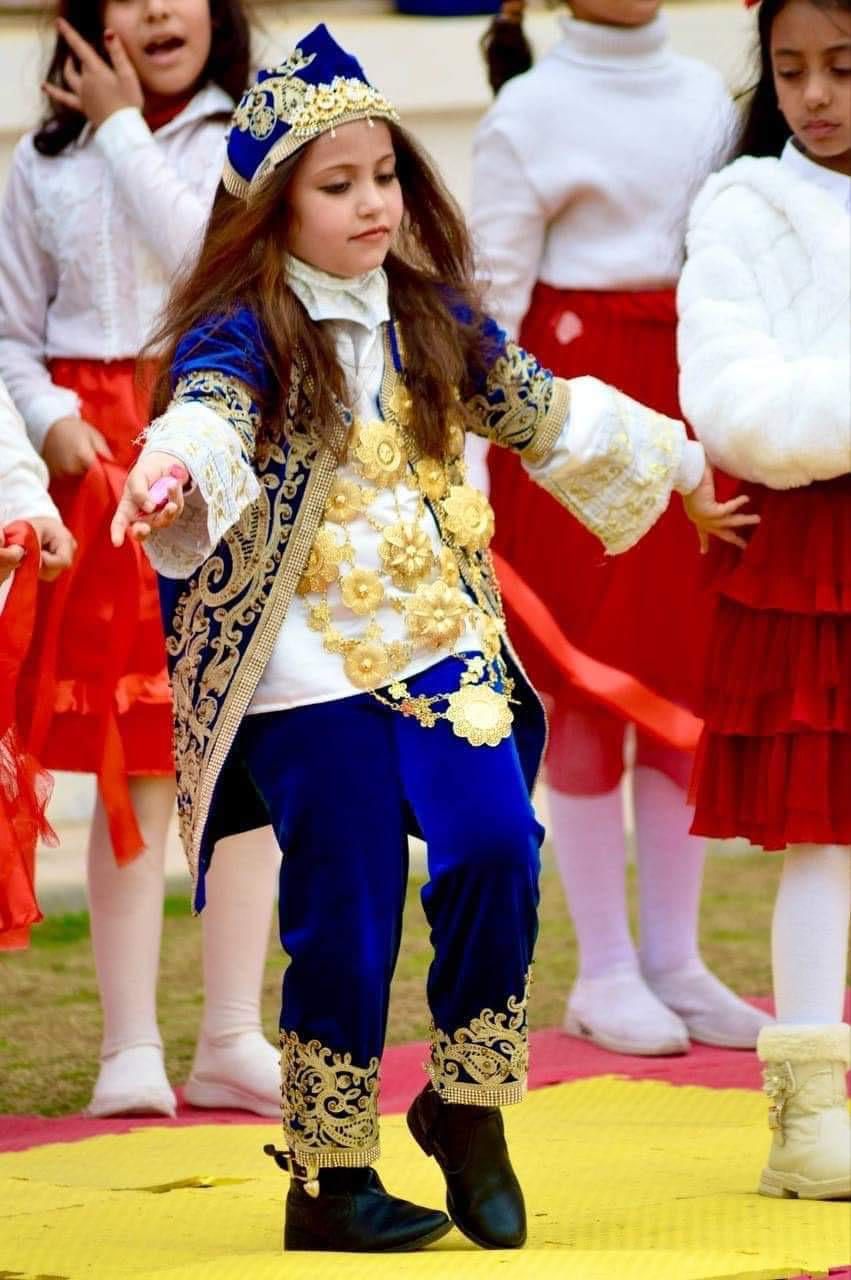

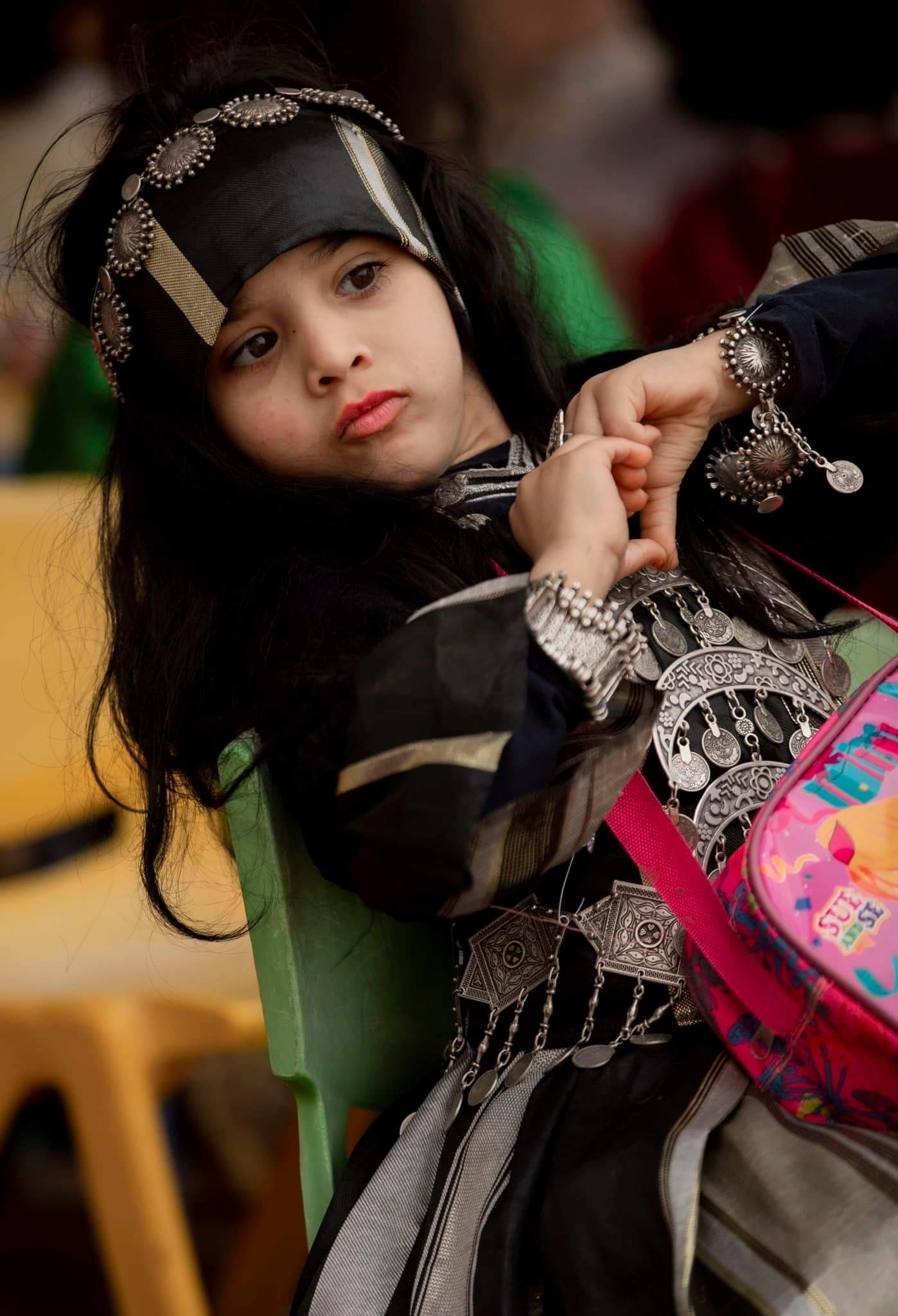

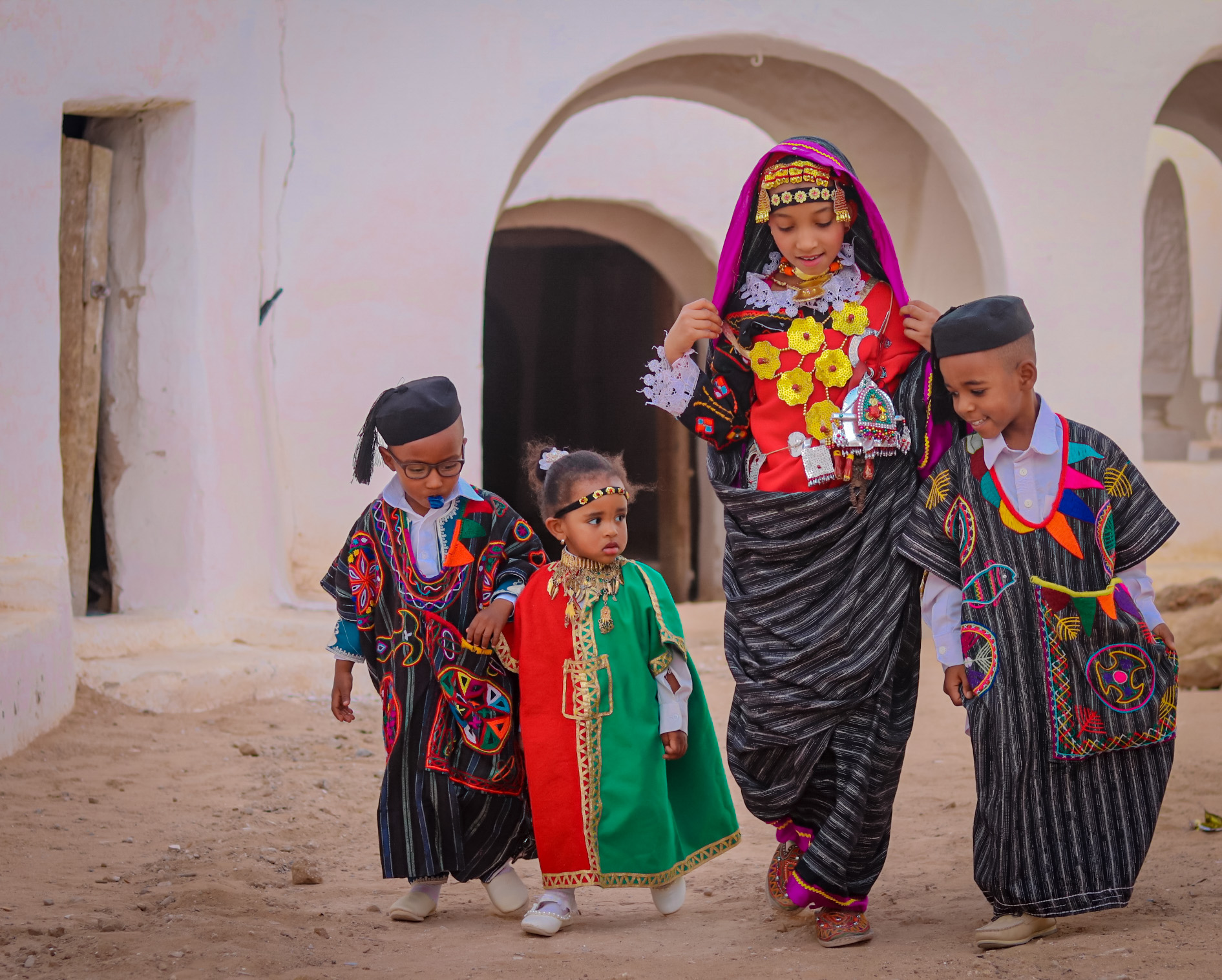

== See also ==
- Culture of Libya
