= Sdot Dan Regional Council =

Coordinates: 31°59′N 34°54′E

Sdot Dan Regional Council מועצה אזורית שדות דן
- Regional council (from 1952)
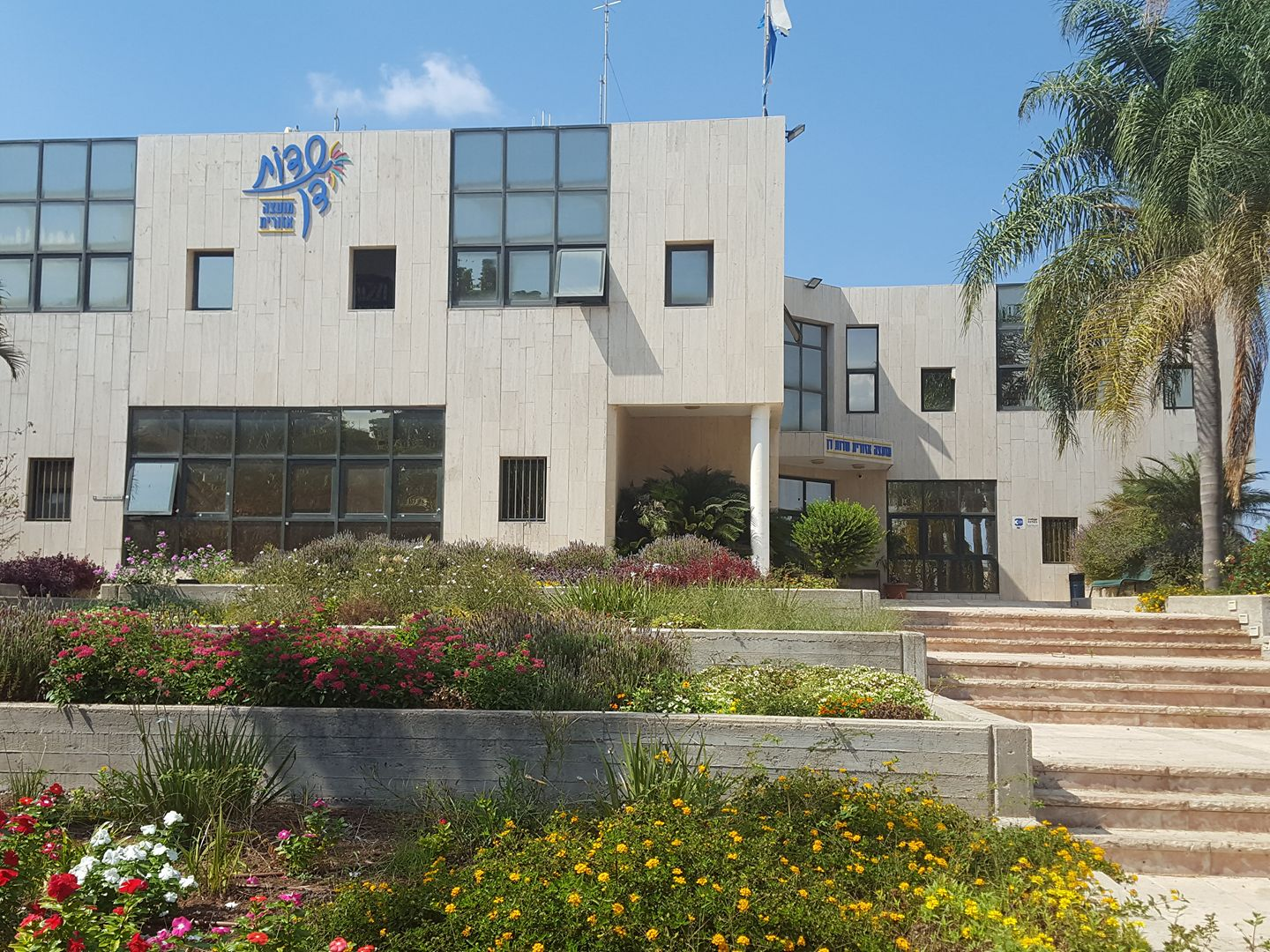
- Sdot Dan Regional Council Headquarters
- Interactive map of Sdot Dan Regional Council
- Country: Israel
- District: Central
- Subdistrict: Ramla
- Natural region: Ramla

Government
  - Head of Municipality: David Ifrah

Area
  - Total: 31,860 dunams (31.86 km^{2}; 12.30 sq mi)

Population (2024)
  - Total: 16,283
  - Density: 511.1/km^{2} (1,324/sq mi)
- Website: www.emek-lod.org.il

Sdot Dan Regional Council (Hebrew: מועצה אזורית שדות דן, romanized: Mo'atza Azorit Sdot Dan, lit. 'Fields of Dan Regional Council') is a regional council in the Central Coastal Plain region of the Central District of Israel. Founded in 1952 as Lod Valley Regional Council, it borders Ben Gurion International Airport and Or Yehuda to the north, Hevel Modi'in Regional Council and Lod to the east, Be'er Ya'akov and Ramla to the south and Beit Dagan and Rishon LeZion to the west. It adopted its current name in 2018. The council's headquarters are located in the community settlement (town) of Kfar Chabad.

== List of communities ==
The council covers eight moshavim, one community settlement, and one village.

Moshavim

- Ahi'ezer · Ganot · Hemed · Mishmar HaShiva · Nir Tzvi · Tzafria · Yagel · Zeitan

Community settlements

- Kfar Chabad

Unofficial settlements (Arab)

- Dahmash

== Demographics ==
Historical population
Year	Pop.	±%
1972	6,000	—
1983	6,900	+15.0%
1995	8,100	+17.4%
2008	11,900	+46.9%
2022	16,081	+35.1%
2024	16,283	+1.3%

== Voting Patterns ==
In the 2022 election, 80 percent of voters in the regional council voted for the parties of the right-wing coalition led by Benjamin Netanyahu, while 20 percent voted for the parties of the center-left coalition led by Yair Lapid and 0.1 percent voted for the Arab parties.

In the 2026 election, 75 percent of voters in the regional council voted for the parties of the right-wing coalition led by Benjamin Netanyahu, while 20 percent voted for the parties of the center-left coalition led by Gadi Eisenkot and 0.1 percent voted for the Arab parties. An additional 2.5 percent voted for the Reservists, and 2.3 percent voted for Amcha Yisrael. Voter turnout increased 9 percent from the 2022 election.
