= Nir Tzvi =

Moshav in central Israel

Nir Tzvi: ניר צבי (Hebrew)
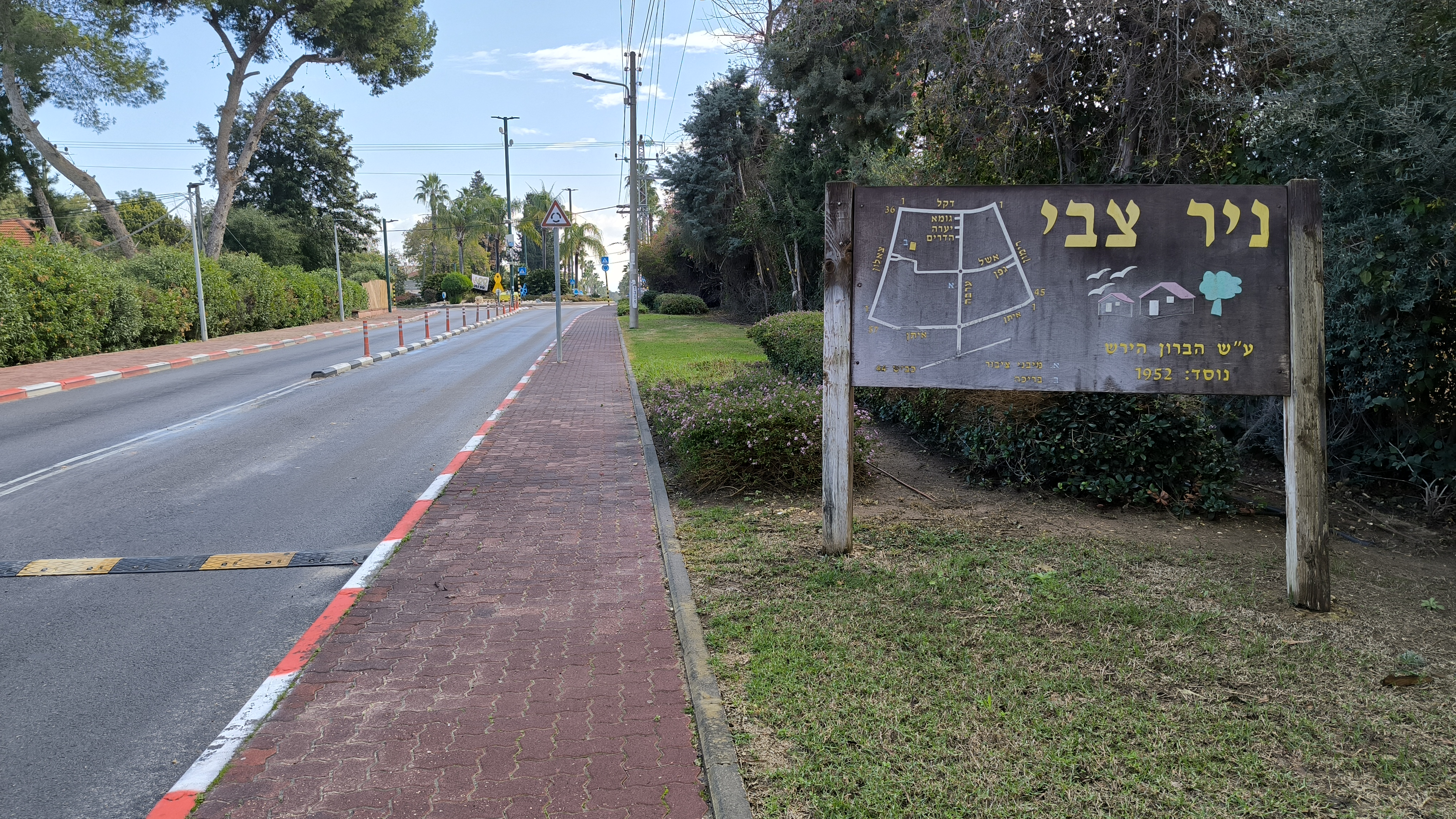
- Entrance to Moshav Nir Tzvi

- Location within Central Israel Location within Israel
- Coordinates: 31°57′4″N 34°51′44″E
- Country: Israel
- District: Central
- Subdistrict: Ramla
- Council: Sdot Dan
- Affiliation: Agricultural Union
- Founded: 1954
- Founder: Argentine immigrants
- Population (2024): 1,116
- Website: /www.nirzevi.muni.il

Nir Tzvi (Hebrew: ניר צבי, lit. 'Zvi's meadow') is a moshav in the Central District of Israel. Located near Lod, it falls under the jurisdiction of Sdot Dan Regional Council. In 2024 it had a population of 1,116.

== History ==
The village was founded in 1954 by immigrants from Argentina and was initially called Kfar Argentina (Argentina Village). The village land was owned by the Jewish National Fund, which financed 35 homes being built. The village was later renamed after Maurice "Zvi" de Hirsch who had helped the Jews of Argentina.

== Education ==
The moshav hosts the primary school that serves as the educational institute for all the children from first to eighth grade in the Sdot Dan Regional Council.

== See also ==
- Argentine Jews in Israel
