= Culture of Libya =

Flag of Libya

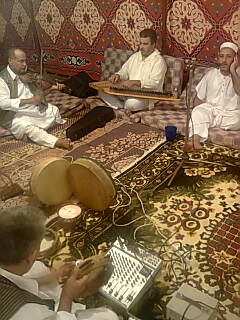
A Libyan traditional music band

Libyan culture is a blend of many influences, due to its exposure to many historical eras. Libya was an Italian colony for over four decades, which also had a great impact on the country's culture. Once an isolated society, Libyans succeeded in preserving their traditional folk customs alive today, now recognized by many as the most "pure" extant form of Arab culture found outside the Arabian Peninsula. Libyan culture places strong emphasis on family, tribal bonds, loyalty, solidarity and faithfulness.

The majority of Libyans are Arab, and 96.6% are Sunni Muslims. The predominantly spoken language in Libya is Arabic. Italian, and English are spoken in a minor level and in tourist areas. 95% of the country is desert and 90% of the Libyan population inhabit the coastline region as a result.

== Flag ==
In February 2011, when the Libyan revolution took place, the national Transition Council reintroduced the old flag used by the kingdom prior to Gaddafi’s military coup in 1969. The flag consists of three colors: red, black and green, which represent the three major regions of the country, red for Fezzan, Black for Cyrenaica and green for Tripolitania; the crescent and star represent the main religion of Libya, Islam.

== Visual art ==
The Libyan civil war of 2011 sparked an awakening in the country's artistic development, inspiring a new generation of artists to use the medium of art to share their thoughts on Libyan politics, history, culture, and contemporary affairs.

Contemporary Libyan artists include Suhaib Tantoush, Mohammed Basheer, Shefa Salem, and Abdullah Hadia. Due to their nation's ongoing development, Suhaib Tantoush is an example of Libyan artist that speaks to the struggles that its people endure. This may be observed in his caricatures, where he captures the day-to-day hardships of Libyans—such as long waiting lines, blackouts, and post-conflict crises—and so recalls the national struggle. The history and legacy of Libya are also depicted in arts demonstrated by Shefa Salem in a Mural, who blended modern Libyan characters with Greek ancestry to represent Libya's legacy.

In Libya, artistic expression has existed for thousands of years. The Tadrart Acacus mountain range in Libya is renowned and recognized as a UNESCO World Heritage Site due to the thousands of cave paintings and carvings that date back 14,000 years. These caverns, which span the Sahara Desert, have animal engravings and depict scenes from times when the desert was habitable. The Central Saharan rock art located in southwest Libya on the Messak plateau. The Pastoral style of rock art are characterized by expressive outline paintings of cattle.

Prior to the war, Libyan art was also well-known. Prominent artists from the country included Mohamed Zwawi (1936 - 5 June 2011), a pioneer of Libyan cartoons whose lighthearted depictions of daily life have featured in publications like at-Tawra and Al Amal. The Arab world has given the artist a lot of praise.

== Literature ==
Libyan literature has its roots in antiquity, but contemporary writing from Libya draws on a variety of influences.

Libyan poet Khaled Mattawa remarks:

"Against claims that Libya has a limited body of literature, classicists may be quick to note that ancient Greek lyric poet Callimachus and the exquisite prose stylist Sinesius were Libyan. But students of Libyan history and literature will note that a vast time gap between those ancient luminaries and the writers of today. [...] Libya has historically made a limited contribution to Arabian literature".

The Arab Renaissance (Al-Nahda) of the late 19th and early 20th centuries did not reach Libya as early as other Arab lands, and Libyans contributed little to its initial development. However, Libya at this time developed its own literary tradition, centred on oral poetry, much of which expressed the suffering brought about by the Italian colonial period.

Libyan literature began to bloom in the late 1960s, with the writings of Sadeq al-Neihum, Khalifa al-Fakhri, Khamel al-Maghur (prose), Muhammad al-Shaltami, and Ali al-Regeie (poetry). Many Libyan writers of the 1960s adhered to nationalist, socialist, and generally progressive views.

In 1969, a military coup brought Muammar al-Gaddafi to power. In the mid-1970s, the new government set up a single publishing house, and authors were required to write in support of the authorities. Those who refused were imprisoned, emigrated, or ceased writing. Censorship laws were loosened, but not abolished in the early 1990s, resulting in a literary renewal. Some measure of dissent began to be expressed in Libyan literature, but books remained censored and self-censored to a significant extent.

With the overthrow of Gaddafi's government in the Libyan Civil War, literary censorship was abolished, and Article 14 of the interim constitution guarantees "liberty of the press, publication and mass media". Contemporary Libyan literature is influenced by "local lore, North African and Eastern Mediterranean Arabian literatures, and world literature at large" (K. Mattawa). Émigré writers have also contributed significantly to Libyan literature, and include Ibrahim Al-Kouni, Ahmad Al-Faqih, and Sadeq al-Neihum.

== Cuisine ==
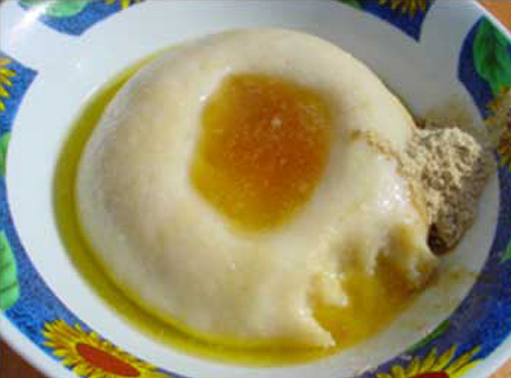
Asida is Libya's traditional breakfast. It consists of a cooked wheat flour lump of dough, sometimes with added butter, honey, or date syrup.

Libyan dishes borrow from the Arabic, Mediterranean and Italian cultures that met in the area. Olives, palm oil, dates, unleavened bread, and stuffed sweet peppers appear frequently in meals. Libyans do not consume any type of pork and all meats must be halal (killed humanely and prayed over according to Muslim customs). Attention to detail in Libyan cooking is very important; in fact, many spices are used in all the dishes and they need to be put in by the right amounts to enrich the taste. The Libyan diet is rich with seafood and includes a diversity of vegetables and cereals. Olive oil is the main ingredient of nearly every meal.

Meals are of great symbolic importance in the Libyan culture and the biggest meal of the day is lunch. Shops and businesses close for a couple of hours in the afternoon to allow families to gather together and eat. There are four main ingredients of traditional Libyan food: olives, palm dates, grains, and milk. Meals usually end with fruit or melon (Libya is known to have excellent fruit crops). People also drink green tea after meals to help aid digestion. Libyans love tea and coffee, and families usually gather together for their afternoon tea/coffee and catch up on the daily gossip. Libyan tea is known to have thick consistency. The Libyan tea is very strong and thick, kind of like syrup. To follow tradition, the tea is usually first poured into a mug and then into another then back to the original mug, back and forth for a few minutes then poured from a high distance to the glass to form ‘reghwa’ or foam.

Libyan soup is a very famous dish throughout Libya and is often presented as a starter. It is considered to be an important dish in Ramadan, where people usually break their fast with soup (after having a glass of milk and a couple of dates). It is a thick highly spiced soup, known simply as Shba Arabiya, or "Arabian soup". It contains many of the ingredients from many other Libyan dishes, including onions, tomatoes, meat (chicken or lamb), chili peppers, cayenne pepper, saffron, chickpeas, mint, cilantro, and parsley.

Bazeen or Bazin is also a very recognizable Libyan food. It is made of a mixture of barley flour, with a little plain flour. The flour is boiled in salted water to make a hard dough, then is kneaded into a semi-spherical ball and placed in the middle of a large bowl (women sit on the floor and hold the pan between their legs while using a wooden ladle to mix and kneed the dough to its solid and thick consistency), around which the sauce is poured. The sauce around the dough is made by frying chopped onions with lamb meat, adding turmeric, salt, cayenne pepper, black pepper, fenugreek, sweet paprika, and tomato paste. Potatoes can also be added. Finally, eggs are boiled and arranged around the dome. The dish is then served with a well-known Libyan salad/complement of pickled carrots, cucumber and chili peppers, known as amasyar.

Another type of Bazin is called ‘Aish’ or ‘Aseeda’ which basically follows the same concept of the Bazzin except it is made with pure white flour, has a smoother and softer texture and is eaten sweet by adding honey, syrup or on some occasions powdered sugar. Aish is normally eaten as breakfast or on special occasions, like when a baby is born or ‘Maylood’, (Mohammed’s birth date).

One of the most popular meals in the Libyan cuisine, which is also a Libyan specialty, since it is not found anywhere else, is batata mubattana (filled potato). It consists of fried potato pieces filled with spiced minced meat and covered with egg and breadcrumbs.

Some other popular dishes in Libya include a diversity of pasta, which are one of Italy’s lasting influences and couscous, which is widely popular across the North African region.

All alcohol is banned in Libya, in accordance with Sharia, the religious laws of Islam. Bottled mineral water is widely consumed, as well as various soft drinks, such as the Coca-Cola.

== Libyan traditional dress ==
Nowadays, in modern Libya, people no longer wear the traditional dress very often, especially women, except the elderly Libyans, who still comply with traditions. The normal dress includes international modernized fashion that has spread out from the Western World. Women in Libya dress modestly and most of them wear the Hijab.

The traditional dress is now limited to special occasions; men wear it more often. In fact, it is popularly worn for Friday prayers, Eid (Islamic holiday) and weddings. Although the outfit slightly differs from one area to another, Libyan men’s clothes tend to be similar across entire Libya. It consists of a long white shirt ‘Jalabiya’or ‘Qamis’, long trousers ‘Sirwal’ and a vest called ‘Sadriya’ that is usually heavily knit with black silk and has buttons on its front. Men also wear a headdress called a ‘Shashiyah’ that is usually red or black. Men in Tripolitania prefer wearing the black Shashiyah while the men in Cyrenaica wear both. Libyan men also wear a tight, knitted, white cap underneath the Shashiyah for when they are indoors. A large outer cloak known as ‘Jarid’ is worn on top and wrapped around the body in a Roman-toga way, except in Libya, the Jarid is usually tied at the right shoulder and the remainder is brought around up over the head. Libyan men wear leather boots, usually with a heel for riding horses, leather sandals or slippers.

As for Libyan women, the traditional outfit differs slightly from one region to another; however, the general outfit consists of a blouse with baggy sleeves that are embroidered with beads and silver/gold thread and baggy silk trousers that have an elastic band at the bottom. On top of that, women wear brightly colored cloths are made into dresses like togas and held together by silver brooches. Women in the rural areas use heavy woven rug-like cloths due to the climate. The head is covered using a colorful cloth embellished with colorful pom-poms. Libyan women wear large pieces of gold or silver jewelry. The neckwear usually goes down to the knees and the bracelets are 4–6 inches wide. The large silver brooches used to attach the cloth are now replaced with gold and are usually decorated with a “Khamaisah”, a hand shaped symbol, or other charms that are believed to keep the evil eye off.

Women only wear the full outfit with the jewelry in special occasions and weddings. It is traditional for the groom to give the outfit with the gold to his bride at their wedding and for the bride to wear it the day after. The women’s traditional outfit is very expensive, but the prices vary depending on the quality and weight of gold or silver.

== Music ==
In Libyan culture, however, music is specific to a city or region. Among the Berber or Amazigh populations in the south of the country, the most widely-liked music is the distinctive folk music of the Tuareg peoples. Sung in their original Temasek dialect. The tinde drum and a imzad, which are only performed by women, are the instruments utilized.

In Libya, women play a significant part in music. Traditional bands are groups of women that perform at gatherings and weddings specifically for women. They sing rhyming lines that vividly and frequently depict Libyan culture and heritage.

Libyan musician Dania Ben Sassi gained rapid attention in 2011 and 2013 for producing and developing Amazigh music that honors the Amazigh people's resistance and features her Tamazight singing. Specific recordings of music in the Tamazight language became quite popular among western Libyans during and after the 2011 revolution, and seen through networks that extended into Tunisia and the larger Maghreb area.

The word "Zimzamat" in Libya refers to a live band; these bands are typically made up of female musicians and are played at parties, weddings, and even everyday events. Remarkably, zimzamat is also present in the most opulent event spaces in Tripoli. Wedding halls frequently have two stages: one for the live band and one for the bride and groom. When it comes to music, they are customarily cheerful, enjoyable, and meet social expectations.

Throughout the 42-year dictatorship of Muammar Gaddafi, western music was outlawed in Libya, and non-Arabic instruments were burned in public places all around the country. As a result, radio broadcasts and television would not play non-Arabic music. In contrast, Libyan music was widely revered and played as part of the country's customs. At the 2011 Libyan Revolution, the people of Libya then rebelled against Gaddafi banning of western music.

== Media ==
Government control over the media has resulted in much of the population preferring to entertain itself by watching videos or foreign stations via satellite. Libyan television programmes are mostly in Arabic with a 30-minute news broadcast each evening in English and French. It is also possible to watch the occasional sports programs. However, the majority of programming is cultural and thus showcases more traditional Libyan music and entertainment.

Libya's daily newspaper is Al-Fajr al-Jadid and is published in Tripoli. Foreign newspapers are available, but are often very out-of-date by the time they reach the shops.

== Tribal and political divide ==
The tribal system has been a persistent aspect of Libyan society throughout history. From before the Roman era, coastal Libya was separated into two separate provinces: Tripolitania in the west, centered around Tripoli, and Cyrenaica in the east, centered on Benghazi. Libya appears to have been split along the classic east-west lines once more as a result of the 2011 civil war. The largest tribes include the Warfalla, Zuwayyah, Qadhadhfa, and Magarha.

Two administrations have been fighting for political control in Libya: one is headquartered in Tripoli (west) and is led by Abdul Hamid Dbeibeh, while the other is in the east and is backed by Marshal Khalifa Haftar.
