= Zeitan =

Zeitan: זיתן (Hebrew)
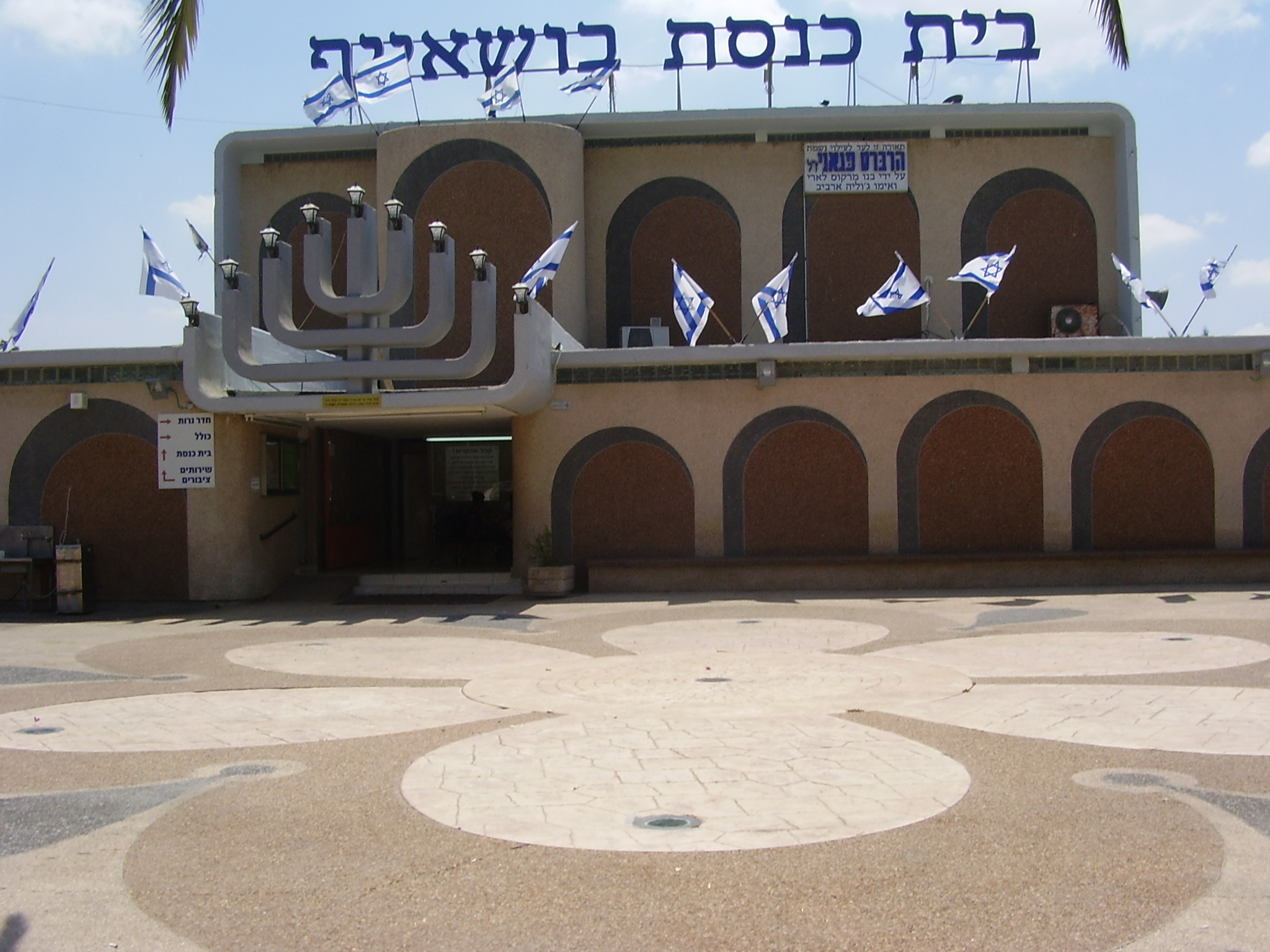
- Bushayef Synagogue

- Location within Central Israel Location within Israel
- Coordinates: 31°58′30″N 34°53′16″E
- Country: Israel
- District: Central
- Subdistrict: Ramla
- Council: Sdot Dan
- Affiliation: Moshavim Movement
- Founded: 5 June 1950
- Founder: Libyan immigrants
- Population (2024): 1,191

Zeitan (Hebrew: זיתן) is a moshav in the Central District of Israel. Located near Lod and the Ben Gurion International Airport, it falls under the jurisdiction of Sdot Dan Regional Council. In 2024 it had a population of 1,191.

== History ==
During the 18th and 19th centuries the area around Zeitan belonged to the Nahiyeh (sub-district) of Lod that encompassed the area of the present-day city of Modi'in-Maccabim-Re'ut in the south to the present-day city of El'ad in the north, and from the foothills in the east, through the Lod Valley to the outskirts of Jaffa in the west. This area was home to thousands of inhabitants in about 20 villages, who had at their disposal tens of thousands of hectares of prime agricultural land.

The village was founded on 5 June 1950 by immigrants from Tripoli in Libya who were originally from a small town named Zliten. There are several theories as to the source of its name; one is that it is an adaption of Zliten; another that it is derived from the Hebrew word for Olive (Zeit), which are grown in the area; whilst a third is that it is taken from the name of one of the Tribe of Benjamin, which lived in the area and is named in 1 Chronicles 7:10;

And the sons of Jediael: Bilhan; and the sons of Bilhan: Jeush, and Benjamin, and Ehud, and Chenaanah, and Zeitan, and Tarshish, and Ahishahar.
