= University of Benghazi =

University in Libya

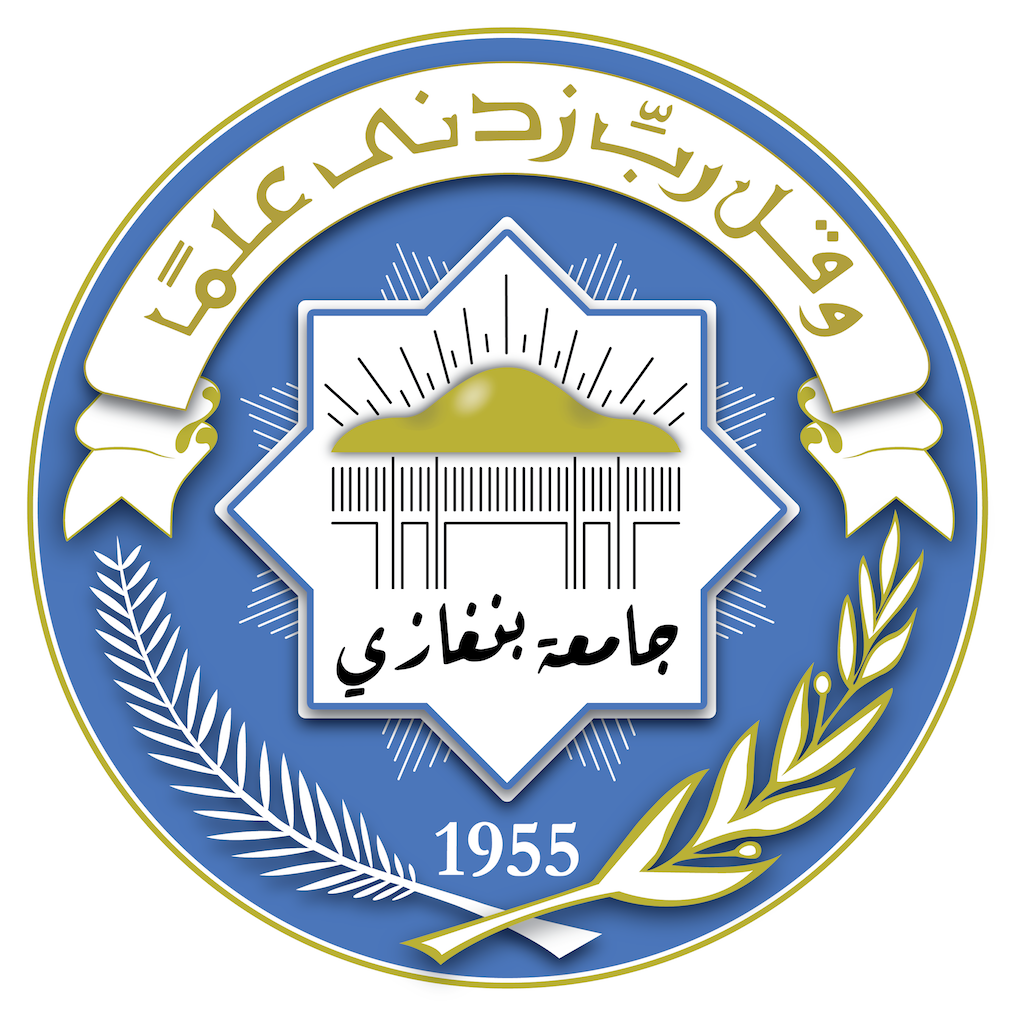
- Former names: Garyounis University; University of Libya
- Type: Public
- Established: December 15, 1955; 70 years ago
- Students: 79,968 (as of 2013)
- Location: Garyounis, Benghazi, Libya
- Campus: 530 acres (2.1 km^{2})
- Website: http://uob.edu.ly/; English

The University of Benghazi (Arabic: جامعة بنغازي), formerly known as Garyounis University, is a public university in Benghazi, Libya, the country's second-largest city as well as one of the most prestigious institutes of higher education in the country. It was founded as the University of Libya on December 15, 1955.

== History ==
The University of Libya was divided into two institutions in 1976: the University of Tripoli, situated in the region's capital in the northwest, and the University of Benghazi, located in the country's second metropolitan area in the northeast. As a result of the division, each university was authorized to form its own designation; hence, the University of Tripoli and in 1976 the University of Benghazi both entities were entitled to Al-Fateh University and Garyounis University, respectively. During the 2011 Libyan Civil War, the title of Garyounis University was once more transformed to the University of Benghazi.

The University of Benghazi consists of 23 faculties and 230 departments and institutes in Benghazi city. In 2020, the Faculty of Arts dissolved one of its literary faculties into two sections, increasing the overall number of faculties to 24. In addition, the university's campuses and scientific institutes occupy a total area of approximately 500 hectares (1,200 acres), with over 85,000 undergraduate students and 3,000 postgraduate students enrolled.

On April 17, 2016, the Libyan National Army overpowered the militants who had seized the University and the surrounding territory in order to train their troops while launching missiles towards the city. During the civil war the students of the University of Benghazi students had been dispersed to many primary, secondary and high schools in order to complete their educations.

Amal Bayou was one of the university's professors.

== Notable alumni ==
- Lamia Abusedra, Libyan ambassador to the United Nations
- Fatima Hamroush, former Libyan Minister of Health and Ophthalmologist
- Shefa Salem, artist and painter
- Haris Silajdžić, former member of the Presidency of Bosnia and Herzegovina

== See also ==
- List of Islamic educational institutions
- List of split up universities
