= Shefa Salem =

Libyan oil painter

- Born: 1996 (age 28–29); Benghazi, Libya
- Education: University of Benghazi (B.A.)
- Known for: Oil painting
- Style: Realism
- Website: shefasalem.com.ly

Shefa Salem, in Arabic: شفاء سالم (born 1996) is a Libyan artist, whose art reimagines Libyan heritage through realistic, large-scale oil-based works and murals. She was listed as one of Middle East Eye's 'Five Emerging Artists to Watch' in 2021.

== Biography ==
Salem was born in Benghazi in 1996. A graduate of the University of Benghazi, she left there in 2021 with a BA in Architecture. Her realistic, large-scale paintings and murals reimagine the history of Libya through its heritage and archaeology. Her first solo exhibition was entitled I Am Libya; it took place in 2021 at the Barah Arts and Culture Centre in Benghazi, where she is based. Significant works include Kaska, Dance of War which depicts Libyan soldiers performing a kaska dance of the indigenous Timihu people, first recorded 5000 years ago in Deir El-Bahari. Another work Libyan Flute is inspired by an ancient flute which was excavated by archaeologists in Libya. Salem found her inspiration for this by reading the journal Libyan Studies. Another work, Funeral Ritual in the Acacus, is inspired by cave art from the Acacus Mountains dating to 4000 BC that featured a boat containing a group of people, one of whom was upside down and believed to be dead.

In 2021 she was listed as one of Middle East Eye's 'Five Emerging Artists to Watch.' Her work has been compared to that of Tewa Barnosa, Afra Alashhab and Malak Elghuel by art patron Najlaa Elageli. In 2023 she was awarded a grant by Culture Resource (Al-Mawred Al-Thaqafy) to produce a new series of work entitled Ethnolibya. The resulting exhibition was shown in December 2024 at Bernice University of Architecture and Urbanism in Benghazi, and in January 2025 at Iskandar House for Arts in Tripoli. Works in the exhibition are inspired by the writing of Muhammad Al-Tarhouni and the poetry of Hamza Al-Falah.
