= Khirbat Din'ila =

Archaeological site in Israel

Khirbat Din‘ila
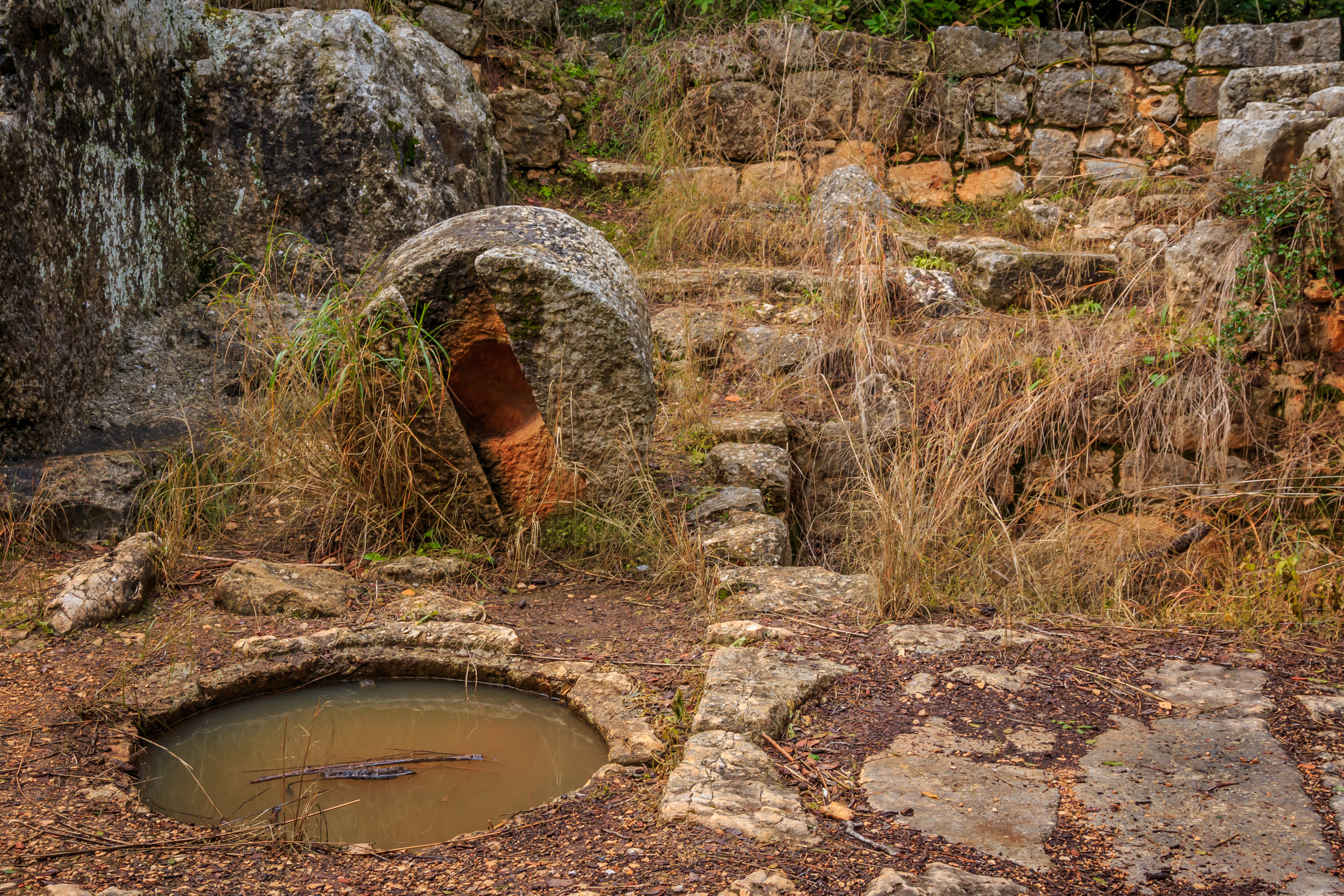
- Byzantine oil press at Khirbat Din‘ila

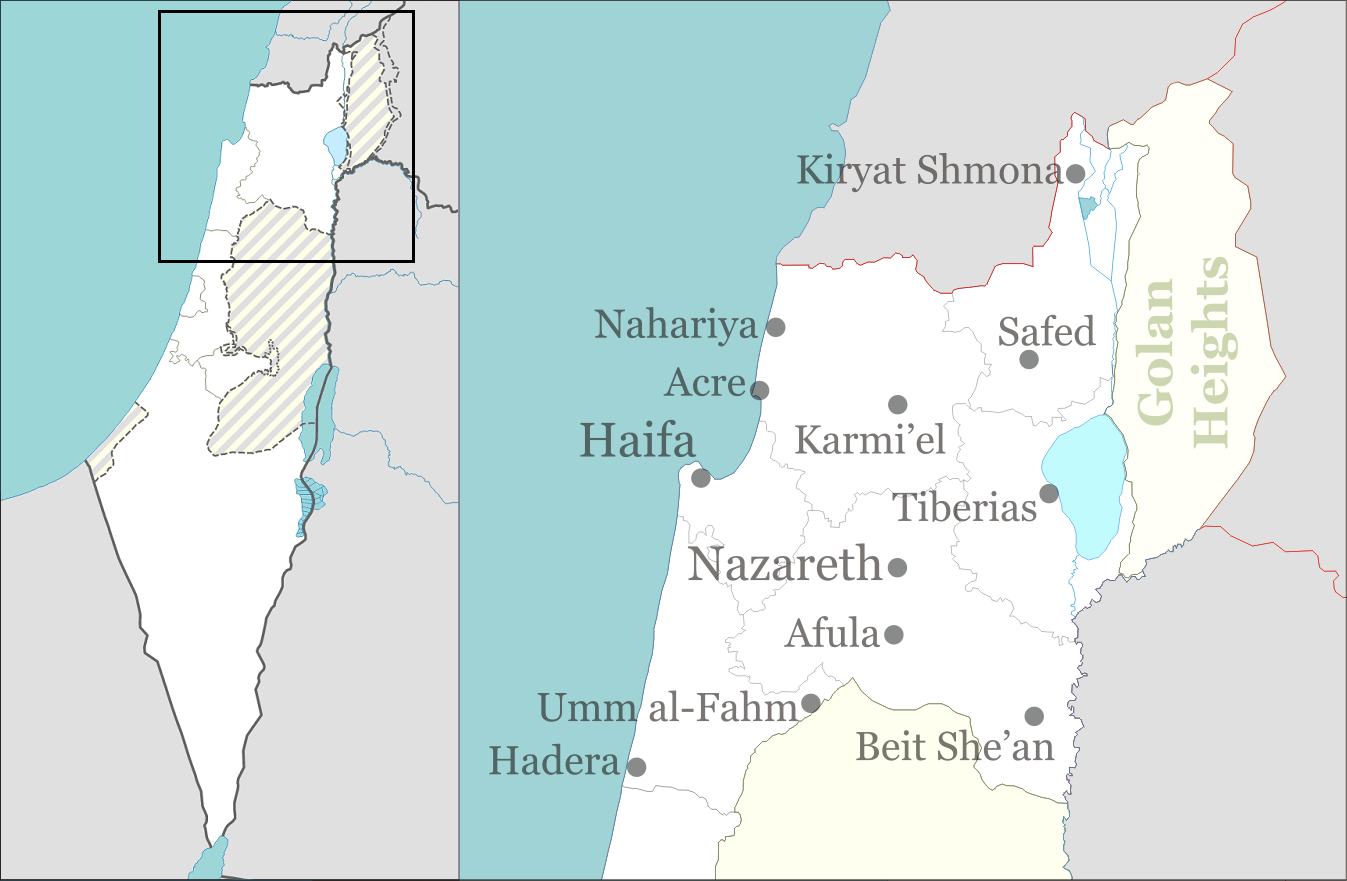
- Location within Northern Haifa region of Israel
- 33.0661°N 35.2462°E
- Type: Archaeological site
- Periods: Roman, Byzantine, Middle Ages
- Location: Upper Galilee, Israel

History
- Built: Roman period

Site notes
- Excavation dates: 2001–2002
- Archaeologists: R. Frankel; A. Tatcher
- Public access: Yes

Khirbat Din‘ila is an archaeological site and former village in the Upper Galilee in the north region of Israel. The village was established in the Roman period, with activity at the site in the Byzantine and medieval eras.

== Archaeology ==
Several surveys were done at the site, when during the survey of 1984 by R. Frankel, 7 oil presses were discovered.

In the years 2001–2002, excavations were conducted by Ayelet Tatcher as the Israel Antiquities Authority started a new project to preserve and restore some of the finding in the site. The seven oil presses that were found at the site imply that the settlement's economy was based on oil production. After the excavation was complete, the walls, thresholds and the oil presses themselves, were restored.
