= Rainbow Cave =

Rainbow Cave may refer to:

- Rainbow Cave (Iowa County, Wisconsin), from the National Register of Historic Places listings in Iowa County, Wisconsin
- Rainbow Cave (Makapansgat, South Africa)
- Rainbow Cave (Western Australia)
- Keshet Cave, Israel
