= Thella =

Ancient Jewish village in Upper Galilee

Thella was a Jewish village located near the River Jordan which formed the northern border of Jewish settlement in the Upper Galilee during the 1st century, as described by Josephus.

Identification of the present site is at Tel Talil (Khirbet Teleil) on a hill near the shores of Lake Hula, in the eastern edge of the modern settlement of Yesud HaMa'ala. This is based on the discovery of a building at the site, identified as an ancient synagogue. However, some archaeologists have questioned this conclusion and locate Thella on the west bank of the Jordan at Khirbet Makbarat Banat Yakub.

The 1st-century historian, Josephus, mentions the village in his day with reference to the extent of Upper Galilee and which stretched "in length from Meroth to Thella, a village near Jordan".

== See also ==
- Tulayl
