= Upper Galilee =

Regional area in northern Israel and southern Lebanon

Upper Galilee: הגליל העליון (Hebrew); الجليل الأعلى (Arabic)
- Region
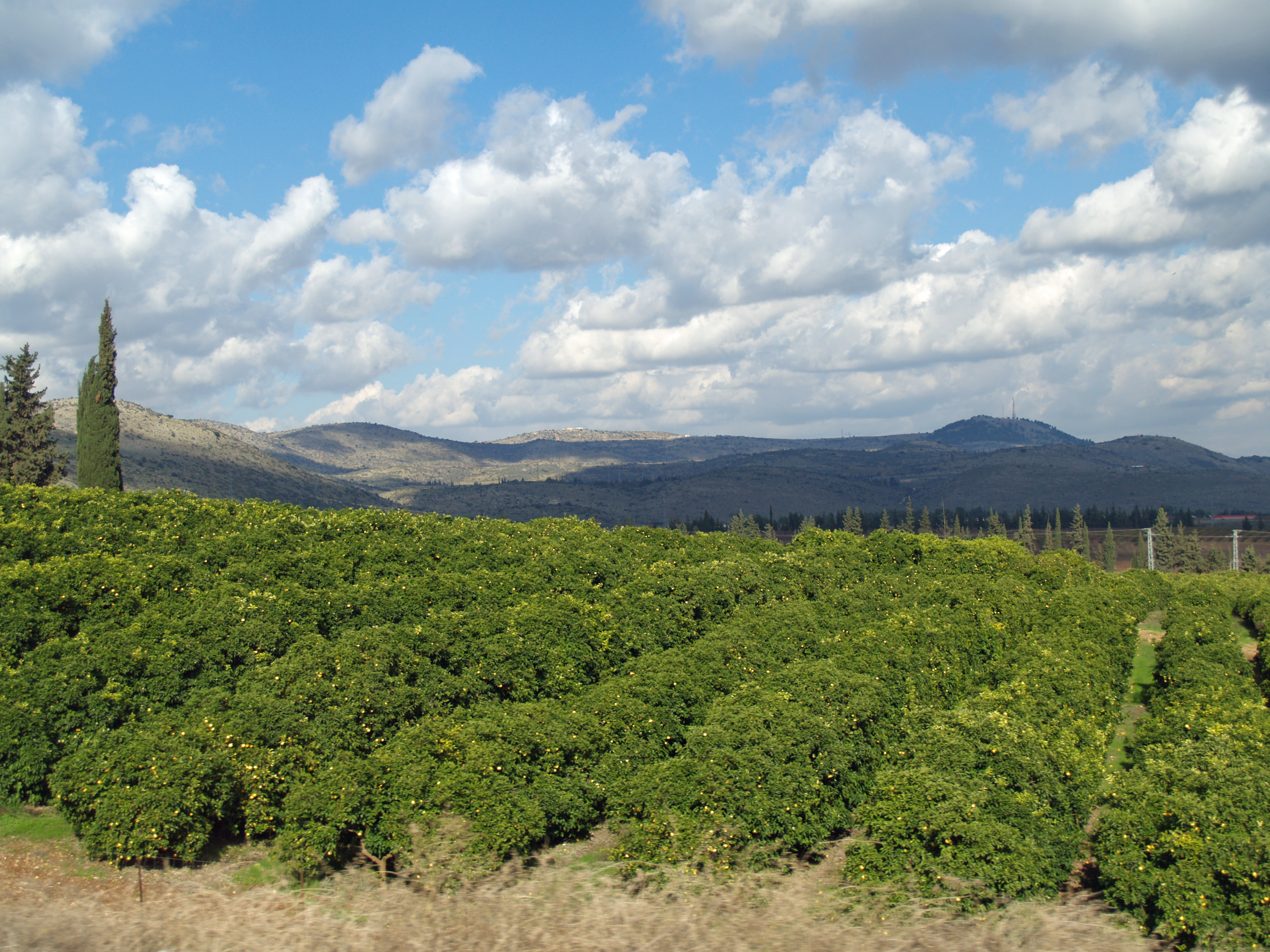
- A lemon orchard in the Galilee
- Interactive map of Upper Galilee
- Coordinates: 32°59′N 35°24′E
- Part of: Israel Lebanon
- Highest elevation: 1,208 m (3,963 ft) (Mount Meron)

Map of the Galilee region

The Upper Galilee (Hebrew: הגליל העליון, HaGalil Ha'Elyon; Arabic: الجليل الأعلى, Al Jaleel Al A'alaa) is a geographical region located in northern Israel and southern Lebanon. Part of the larger Galilee region, it is characterized by its higher elevations and mountainous terrain. The term "Upper Galilee" is ancient, and has been in use since the end of the Second Temple period. From a political perspective, the Upper Galilee is situated within the administrative boundaries of the Northern District of Israel.

The Upper Galilee is known for its natural beauty, including lush landscapes, Mediterranean forests, and scenic vistas. Significant natural sites include Nahal Amud and the Keshet Cave. It is also an area where vineyards and wineries thrive, producing quality wines. Mount Meron stands as the highest point in the area, reaching an elevation of 1,208 m (3,963 ft) above sea level. Safed is a main city in the region and also hosts an artists' quarter that was a major center of Israeli art.

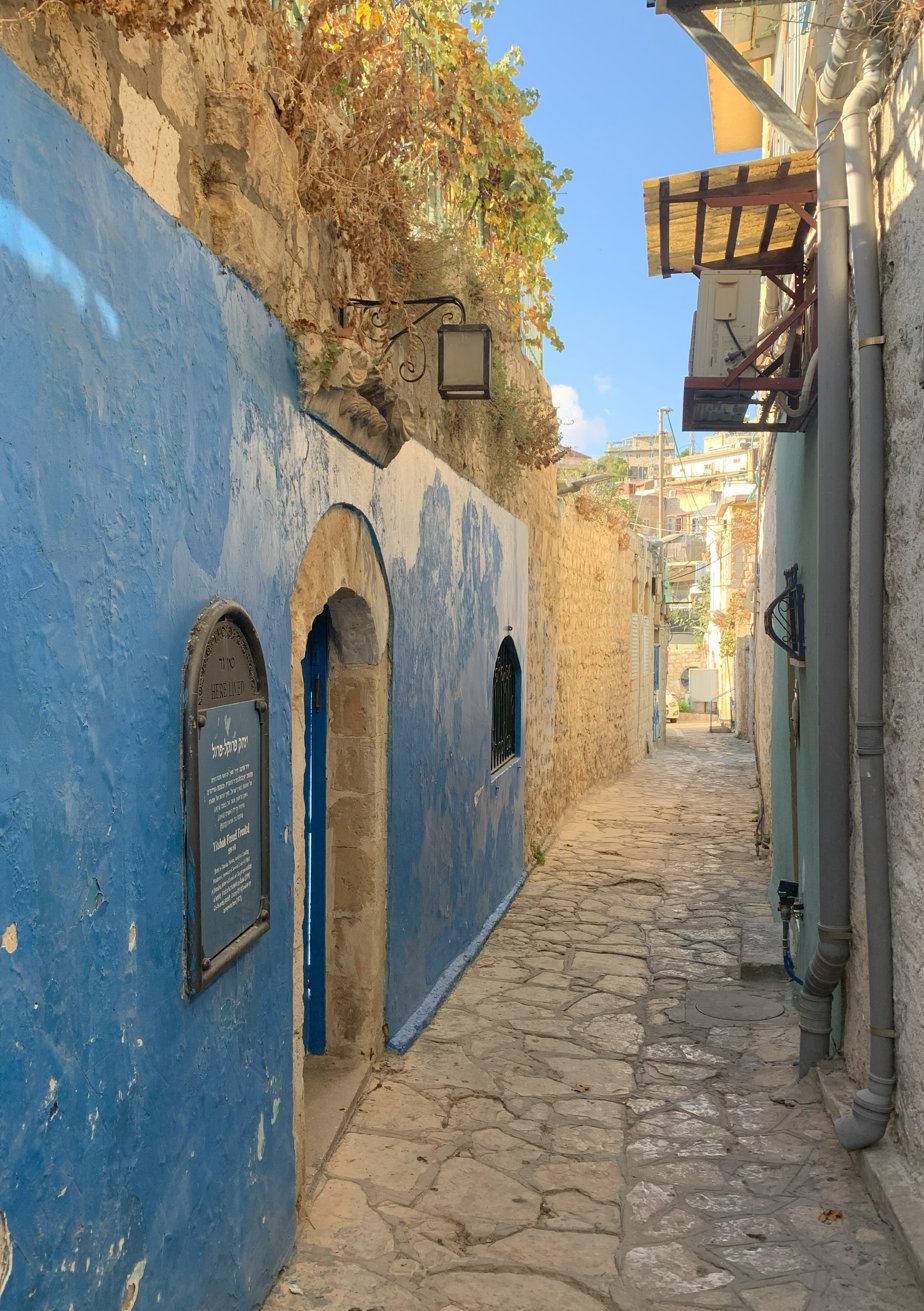
A street in the artists' quarter of Safed. Safed is the major Israeli city in the region.

Although historical definitions encompass parts of southern Lebanon within the boundaries of the Upper Galilee, the Lebanese government does not use the term "Galilee" for any part of its territory.

== Boundaries ==
Originally, the term "Upper Galilee" referred to a larger region, encompassing the mountainous regions of what is today northern Israel and southern Lebanon. The boundaries of this region were the Litani River in the north, the Mediterranean Sea in the west, the Lower Galilee in the south (from which it is separated by the Beit HaKerem Valley), and the upper Jordan River and the Hula Valley in the east.

According to the first century Jewish historian Josephus, the bounds of Upper Galilee stretched from Bersabe in the Beit HaKerem Valley to Baca (Peki'in) in the north, and from Meloth to Thella. The extent of this region is approximately 470 km^{2}.

In present-day usage, the toponym mainly refers only to the northern part of the Galilee that is under Israeli sovereignty. That is, the term today does not include the portion of Southern Lebanon up to the Litani River, or the corresponding stretches of the Israeli Coastal Plain to the west, or the Jordan Rift Valley to the east. These are considered to be separate geographical areas that are not part of “Upper Galilee.”

== History ==
=== Ancient times ===
In the late 2nd century BCE, the Upper Galilee was conquered by Hasmonean Judea, under either King Judah Aristobulus I or his brother and successor, Alexander Jannaeus. The change of hands is archaeologically attested at the Qeren Naftali fortress, which was originally a Hellenistic fort but became the site of a Jewish garrison following the conquest.

The Byzantine period saw growing population density in the Upper Galilee. The western part was home to Christian agricultural villages, some possibly monasteries or monastic farms, many of which today lie hidden beneath forest overgrowth, while the eastern part, beyond Mount Meron, had a Jewish population. Olive oil production was an important part of the local economy; some surviving stands of wild olive trees may be remnants of Byzantine-era orchards.

The Upper Galilee is home to numerous significant ancient synagogues, dating from Roman and Byzantine times. Those include the synagogues of Bar'am, Nabratein, Gush Halav, Huqoq, Chorazin, Meron and a few others. Remains of synagogues has also been found in Qision and Alma.

=== Modern period ===
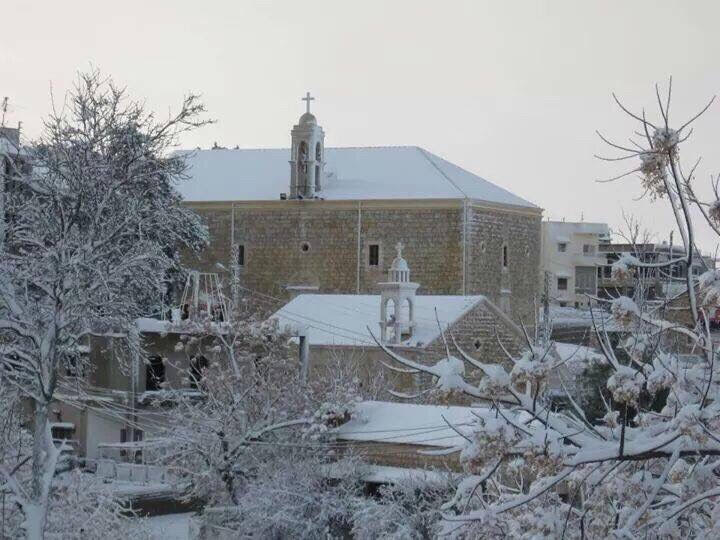
Ain Ebel in the Lebanese Upper Galilee

Following the dissolution of the Ottoman Empire and the Balfour Declaration in which the British Empire promised to create "A Jewish National Home" in Mandatory Palestine, the Zionist Movement presented to the Versailles Peace Conference a document calling for including in the British Mandate of Palestine the entire territory up to the Litani river—with a view to this becoming eventually part of a future Jewish state.

However, only less than half this area was actually included in British Mandatory Palestine, the final border being influenced both by diplomatic maneuverings and struggles between Britain and France and by fighting on the ground, especially the March 1920 battle of Tel Hai.

For a considerable time after the border was defined so to make the northern portion of the territory concerned part of the French mandated territory that became Lebanon, many Zionist geographers—and Israeli geographers in the state's early years—continued to speak of "The Upper Galilee" as being "the northern sub-area of the Galilee region of Israel and Lebanon".

Under this definition, "The Upper Galilee" covers an area spreading over 1,500 km^{2}, about 700 in Israel and the rest in Lebanon. This included the highland region of Belad Bechara in Jabal Amel located in South Lebanon, which was at for some time known in Hebrew as "The Lebanese Galilee". As defined in geographical terms, "it is separated from the Lower Galilee by the Beit HaKerem valley; its mountains are taller and valleys are deeper than those in the Lower Galilee; its tallest peak is Har Meron at 1,208 m above sea level. Safed is one of the major cities in this region".

In recent decades, however, this usage has virtually disappeared from the general Israeli discourse, the term "Upper Galilee" being used solely in reference to the part located in Israel.

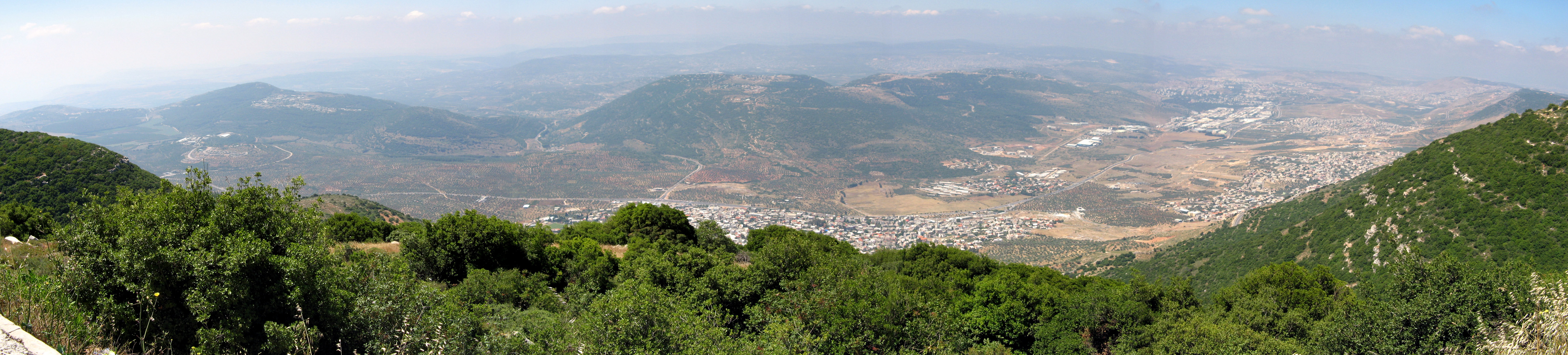
A panoramic view taken from mount Ari in the Upper Galilee towards the Lower Galilee

== In art ==
The Upper Galilee region, specifically the city of Safed was a centre of Israeli and Jewish art since 1920 when the School of Paris painter, Yitzhak Frenkel visited the region and was the first to settle in Safed where he later established an art school. In Safed was established the Artists' quarter of Safed. Safed harbored mysticism and was reminiscent of picturesque villages, which drew artists such as Frenkel, Marc Chagall, Moshe Castel, Mordechai Levanon and others. Artists were drawn to the upper galilee due to its mountainous landscapes and "mysticsm". Prior to the air conditioner, Safed also attracted artists due to its climatic conditions which were more comfortable than Tel Aviv during the summer. Safed also offered different themes for the artists, from the Klezmer musicians to the Hasidim and the city itself. Mount Meron was also an object in artworks by Jewish artists with artists such as Frenkel and Rolly Schaffer painting serene or fiery scenes of sunset over the mountain.

== Gallery ==
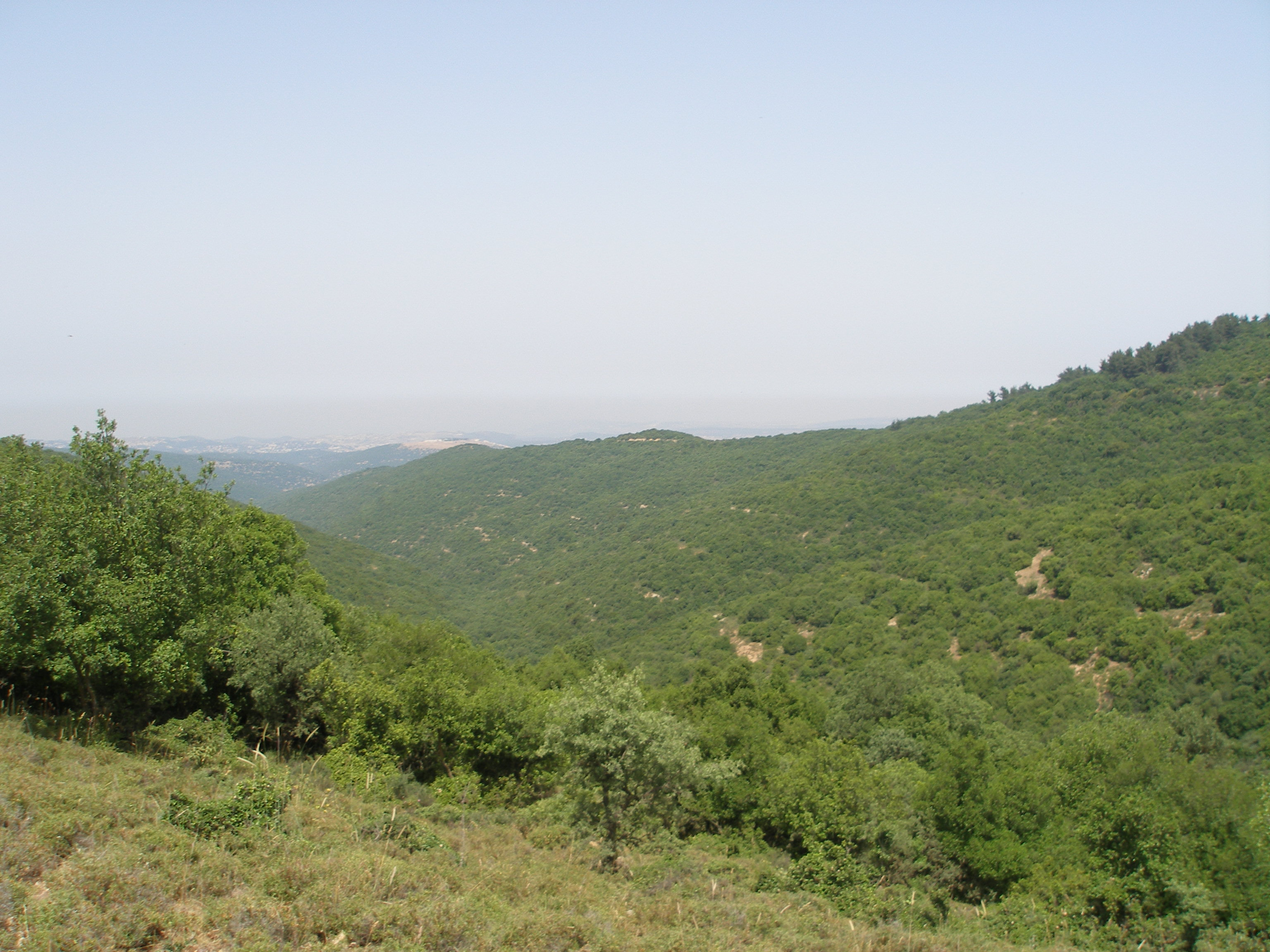
Mountainous area in the Upper Galilee

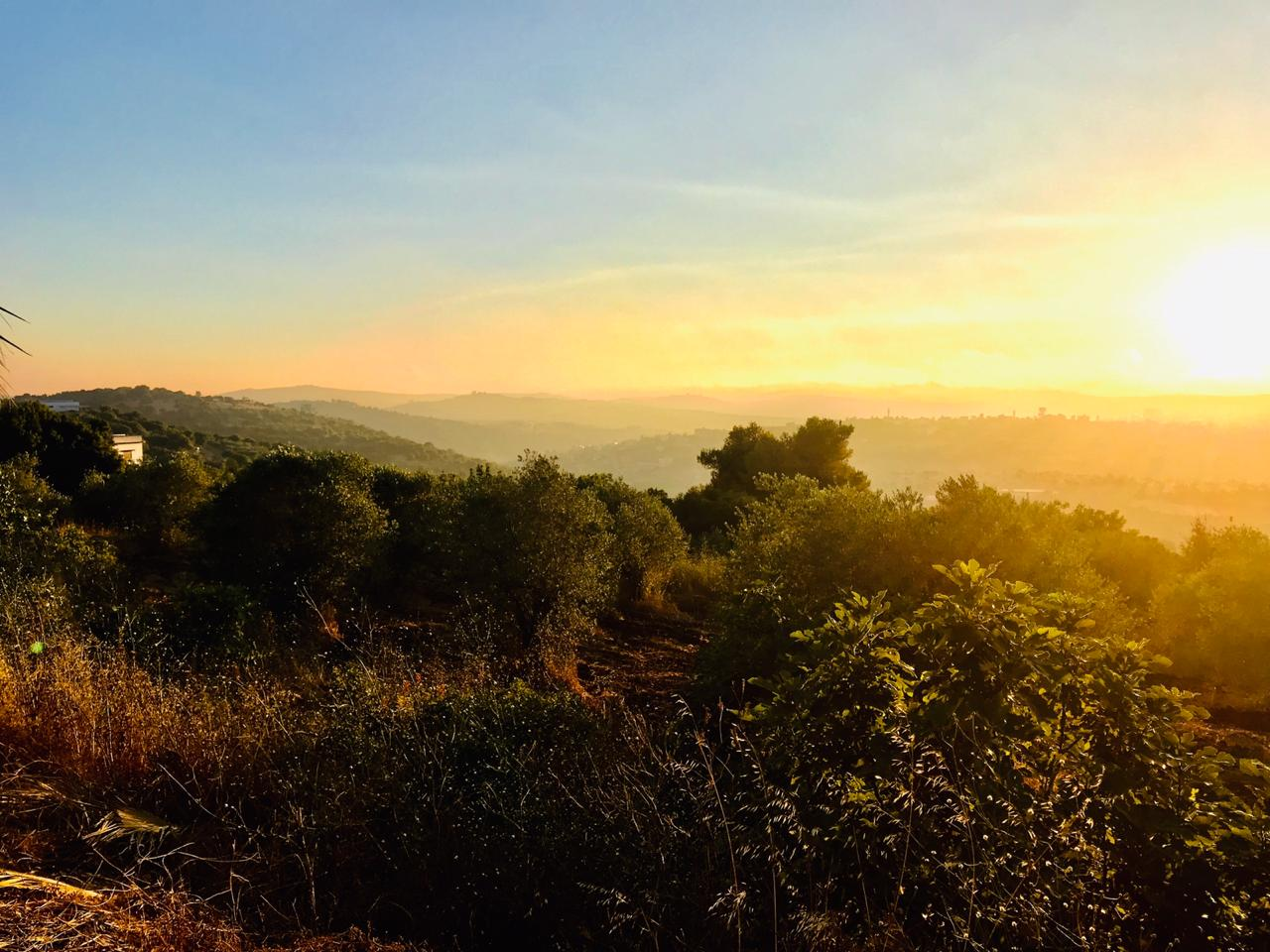
Ain Ebel in the Lebanese Upper Galilee

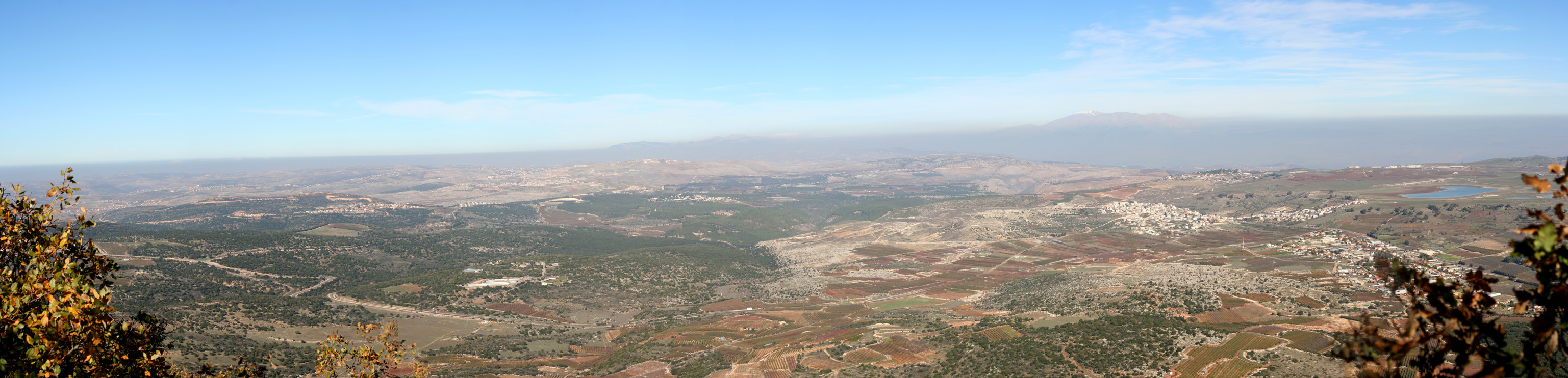
A view looking north from the top of Har Meron in the Upper Galilee. Parts of southern Lebanon are visible in the background

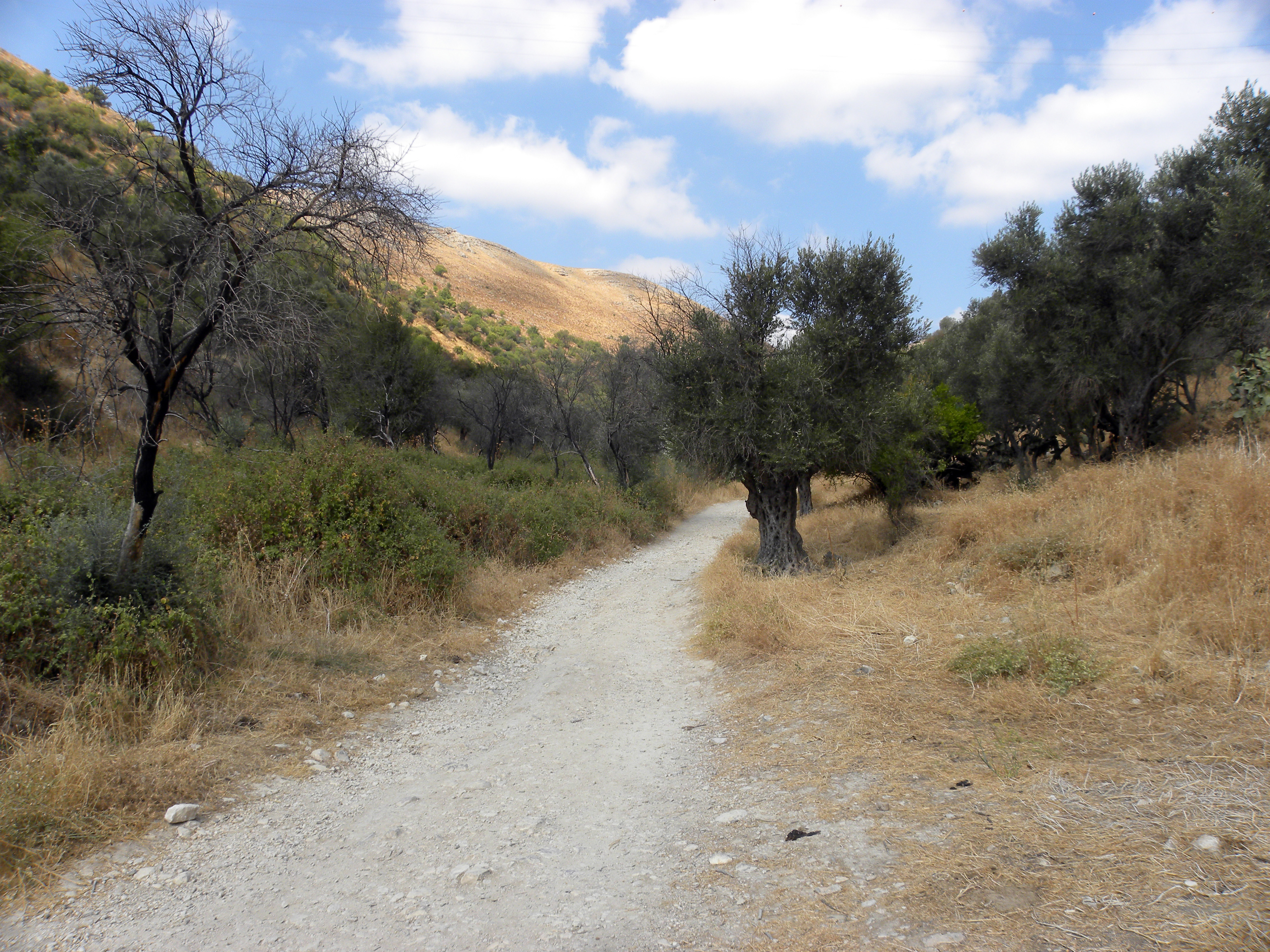
Old road from Rosh Pinna to Safed, Upper Galilee, Israel

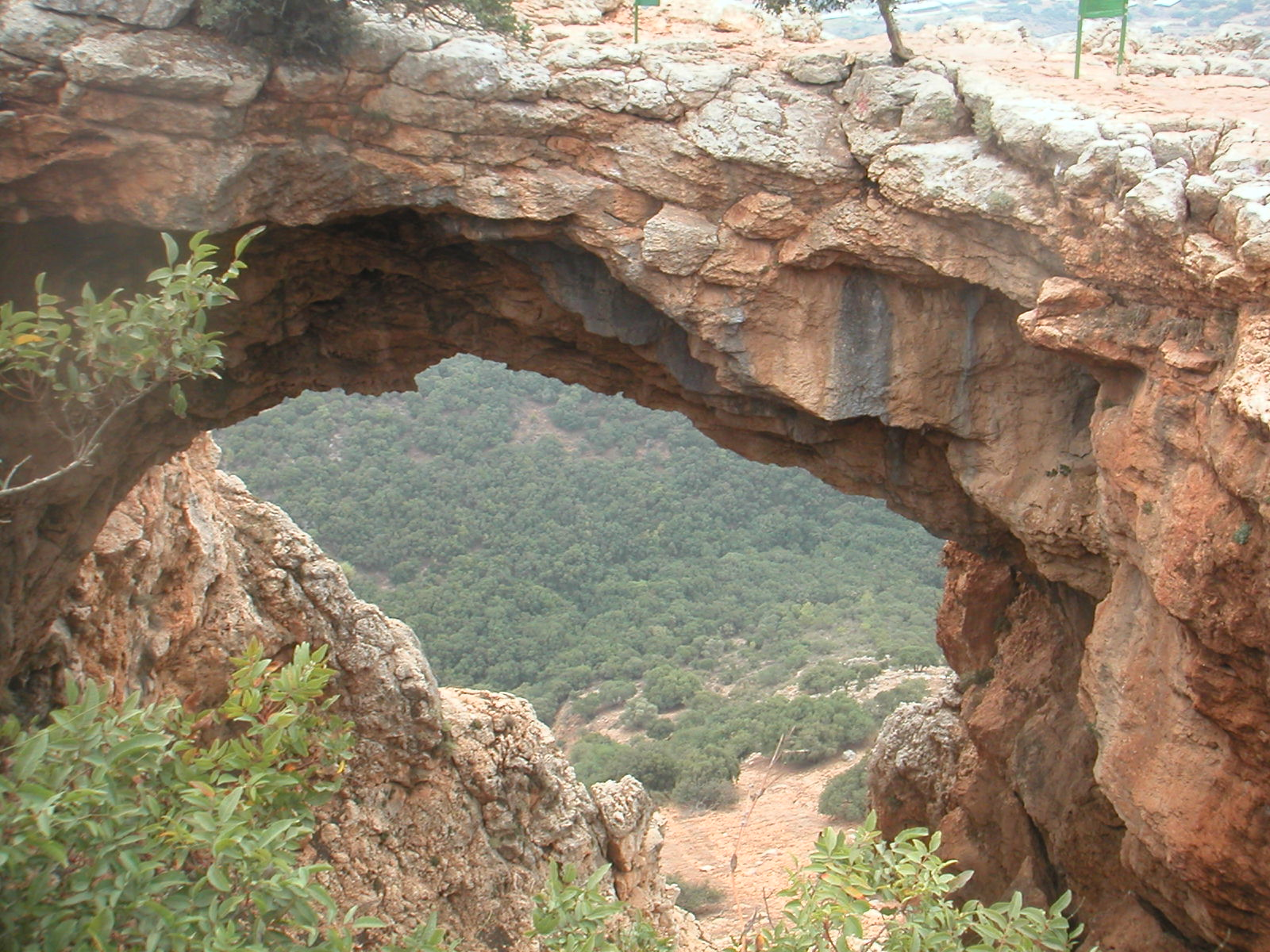
The Keshet Cave (a natural arch) located on a ridge near Nahal Betzet

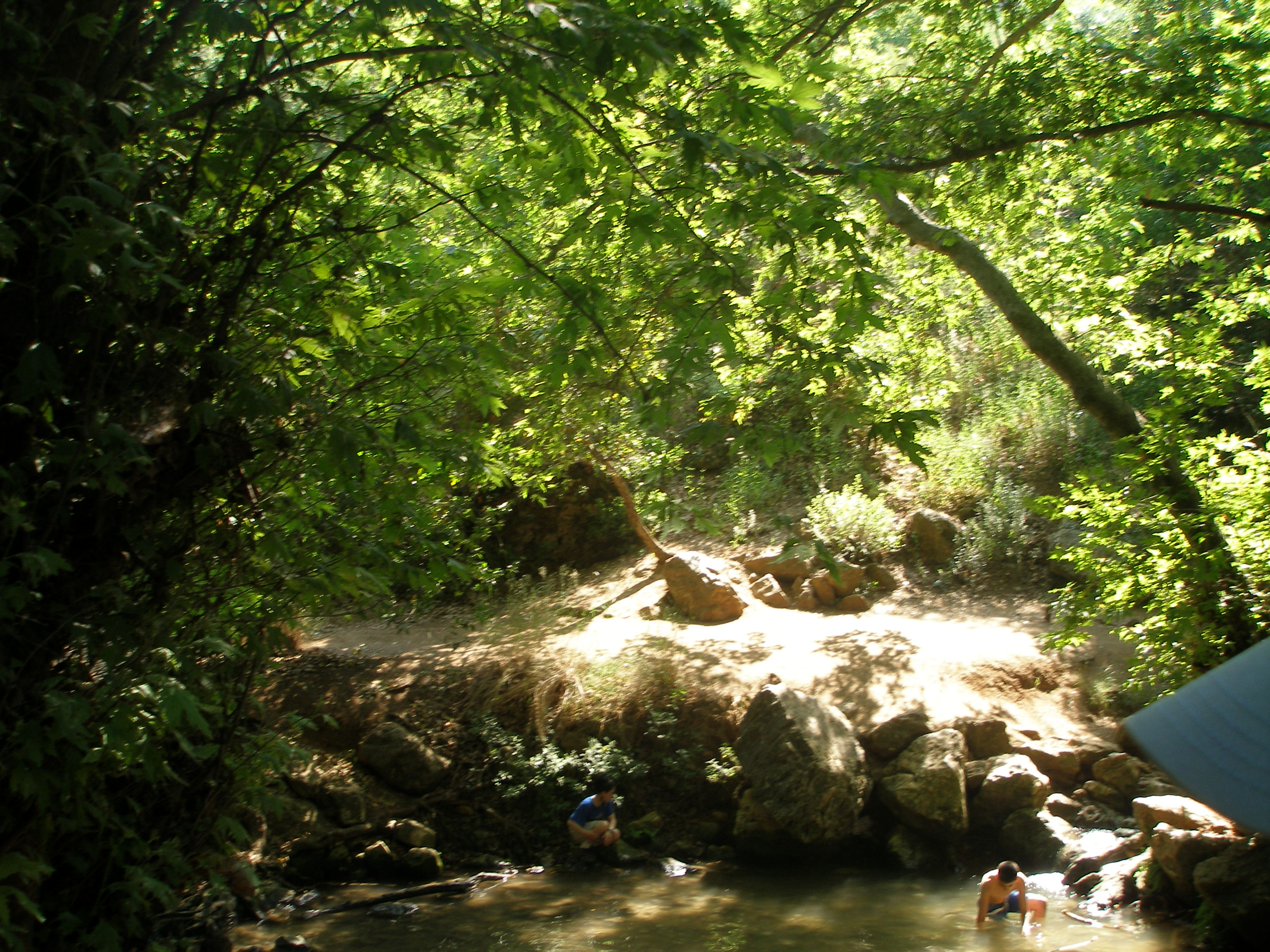
The Amud river

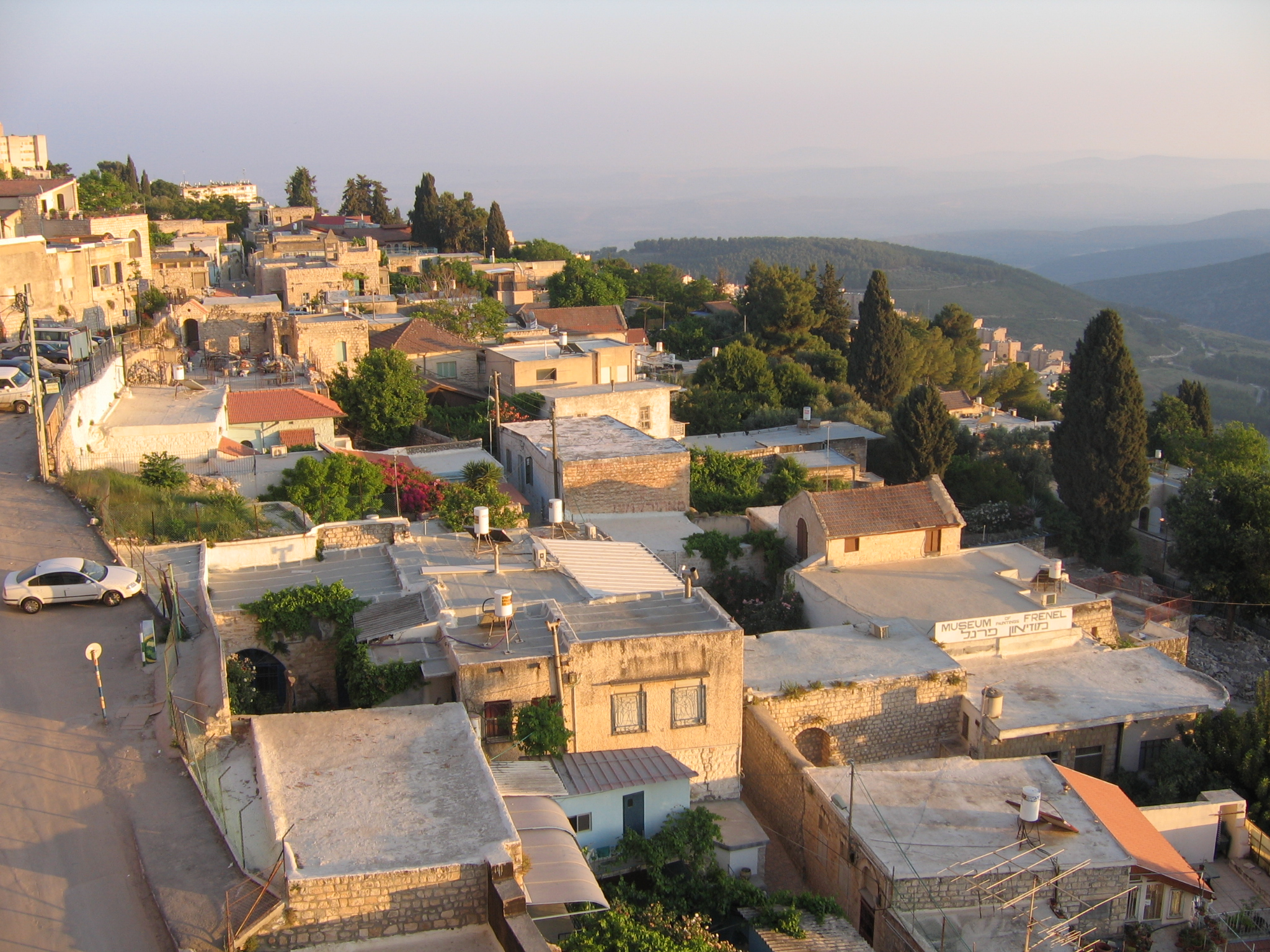
Safed, overlooking the artists' quarter.

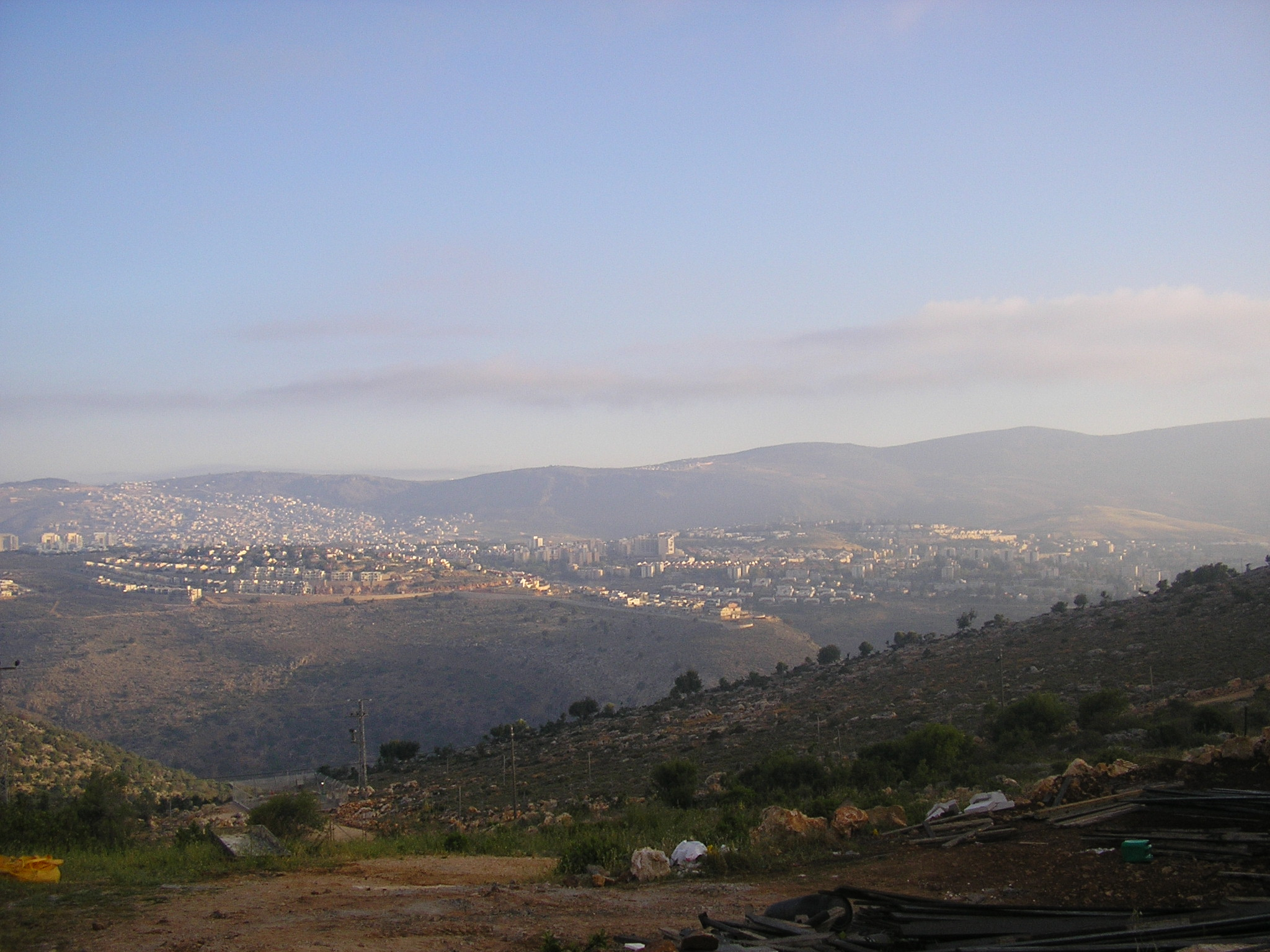
Karmiel

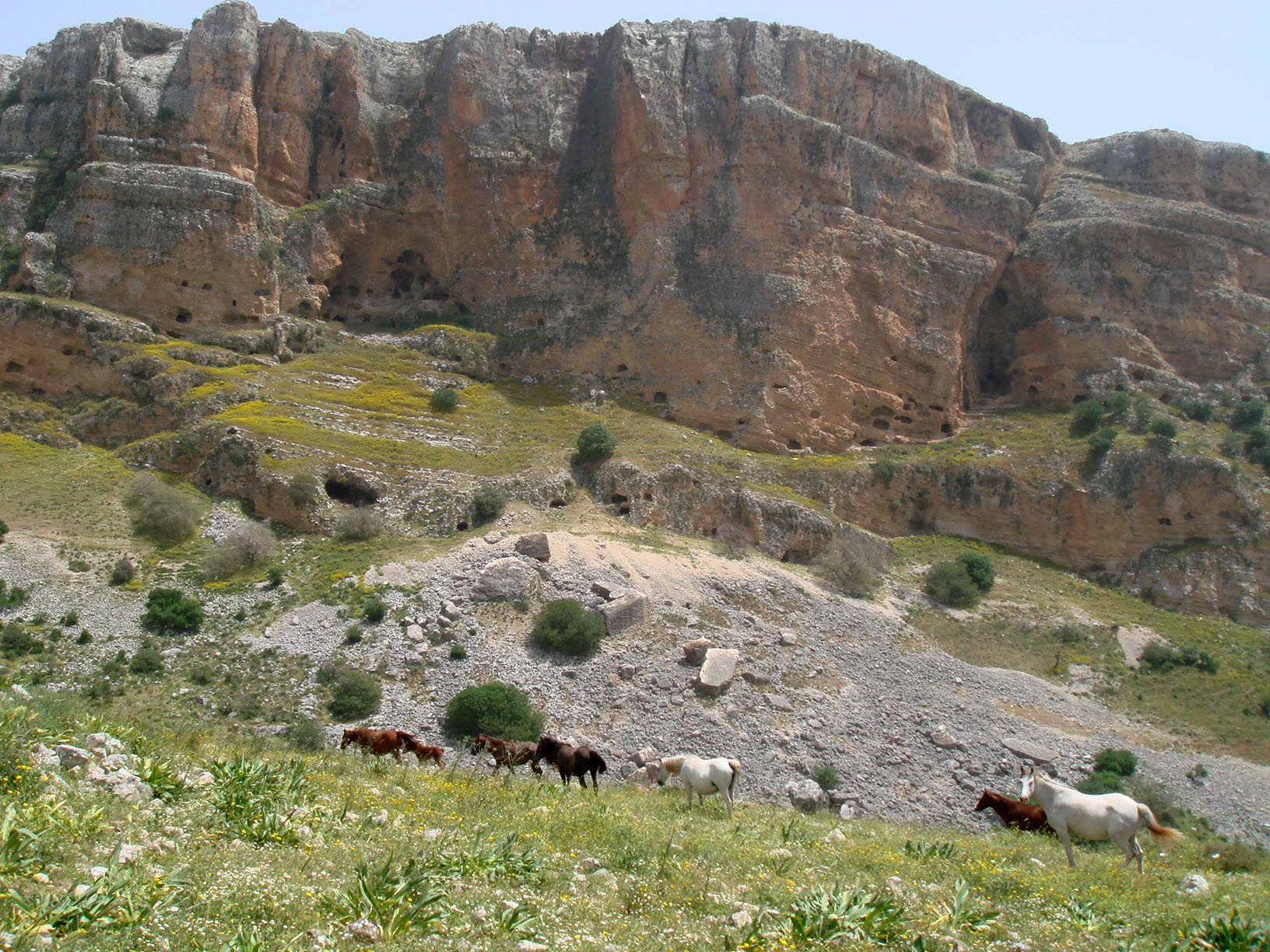
Horses roam in Amud stream, near the Sea of Galilee

== See also ==
- Galilee panhandle
- Northern District (Israel)
- Upper Galilee Regional Council
