= Ali Fahmi Khushaim =

Libyan historian (1936–2011)

- Born: 1936; Misrata, Libya
- Died: 7 June 2011 (aged 74–75); Hamburg, Germany
- Education: University of Libya, Ain Shams University
- Occupations: Historian, writer, linguist

Ali Fahmi Khushaim (Arabic: علي فهمي خشيم) (1936–2011) was a Libyan linguist and thinker who served as Minister of Culture and as a former president of the Libyan Academy of Language, as well as a member of the Academy of the Arabic Language in Cairo. He was considered one of the prominent figures of literature, thought, and culture in modern Libya. His works covered a wide range of fields, including philosophy, history, language, literary criticism, translation, and creative writing in both prose and poetry, despite the controversial nature of his linguistic views and their marginal classification within the academic sphere.

== Early life and education ==
Khashim was born in Misrata, Libya, in 1936, into a family belonging to the Circassian tribe. He obtained a Bachelor of Arts in Philosophy from the Faculty of Arts, University of Libya in Benghazi in 1962. He earned a Master of Arts in Philosophy from the Faculty of Arts, Ain Shams University, in 1966, and a PhD in Philosophy from the School of Oriental Studies at the University of Durham, United Kingdom, in 1971.

== Death ==
Ali Fahmi Khushaym died in Hamburg, Germany, on Thursday 7 June 2011, after a long battle with illness.
