= Nahal Betzet =

Intermittent stream in Israel

Nahal Betzet Nature Reserve
- שמורת נחל בצת
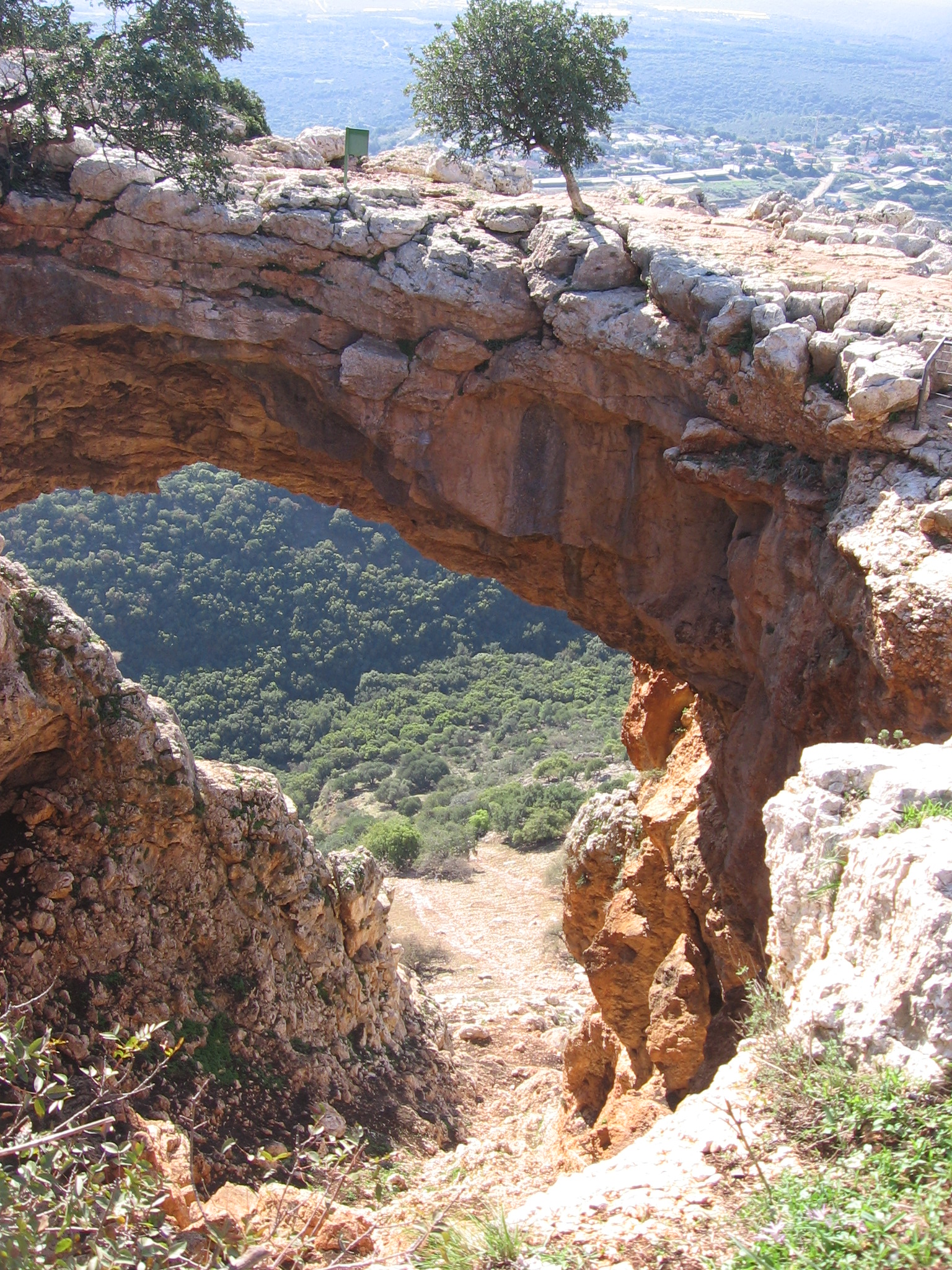
- The arch known as Keshet Cave (Rainbow Cave), the remains of a large collapsed cave

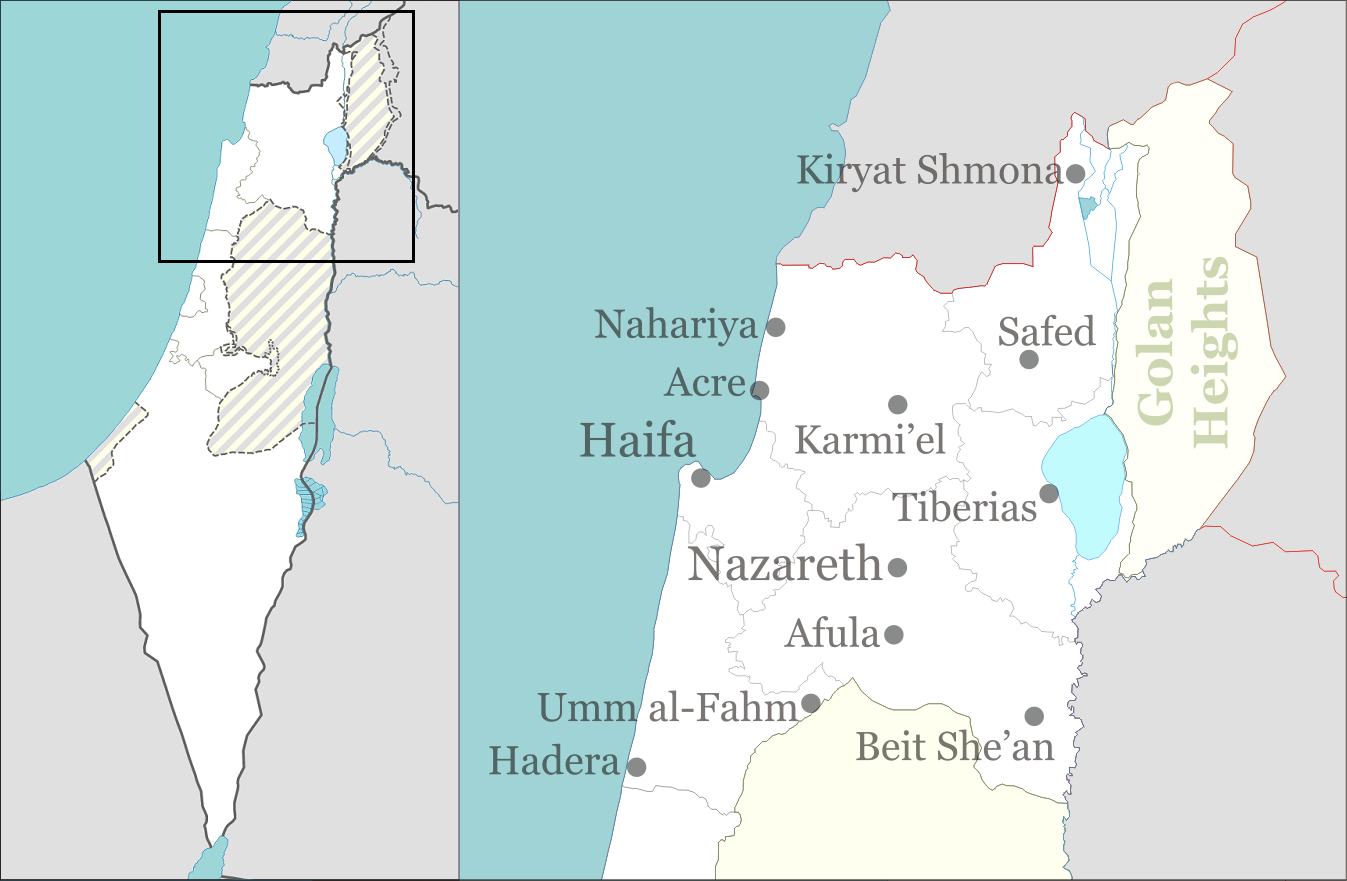
- Location within Northern Haifa region of Israel
- Location: Upper Galilee, Israel
- Nearest city: Nahariya
- Coordinates: 33.0728°N 35.2144°E
- Area: 7,650 dunams (7.65 km^{2}; 2.95 sq mi)
- Established: 1972
- Governing body: Israel Nature and Parks Authority

Nahal Betzet (Hebrew: נחל בצת, lit. "Betzet stream"; Arabic: وادي كركرة, Wadi Karkara), is a once-perennial and now intermittent stream in the Upper Galilee, Israel. Most of it is part of the nature reserve named for the stream.

== Geography ==
The stream crosses the border from Lebanon into Israel between Shtula and Zar'it, and flows westward, emptying into the Mediterranean Sea south of Rosh HaNikra. The stream runs along a geological fault line through dolomite and limestone, and is fed along its course by springs. Currently, Mekorot (the national water company) pumps the water of the stream's springs, and has been accused of causing the stream to dry up. Many caves are formed on the banks of the stream, most notably the arch known as Keshet Cave (Rainbow Cave).

== Nature reserve ==
Most of the stream is part of a nature reserve that bears its name. The reserve, declared in 1972 covers 7650-dunam and part of it reaches the Israel-Lebanese border. In 2009, 1225 dunams were added to the reserve.

Flora in the area includes Nerium oleander, Platanus orientalis, and Adiantum capillus-veneris.

== Gallery ==
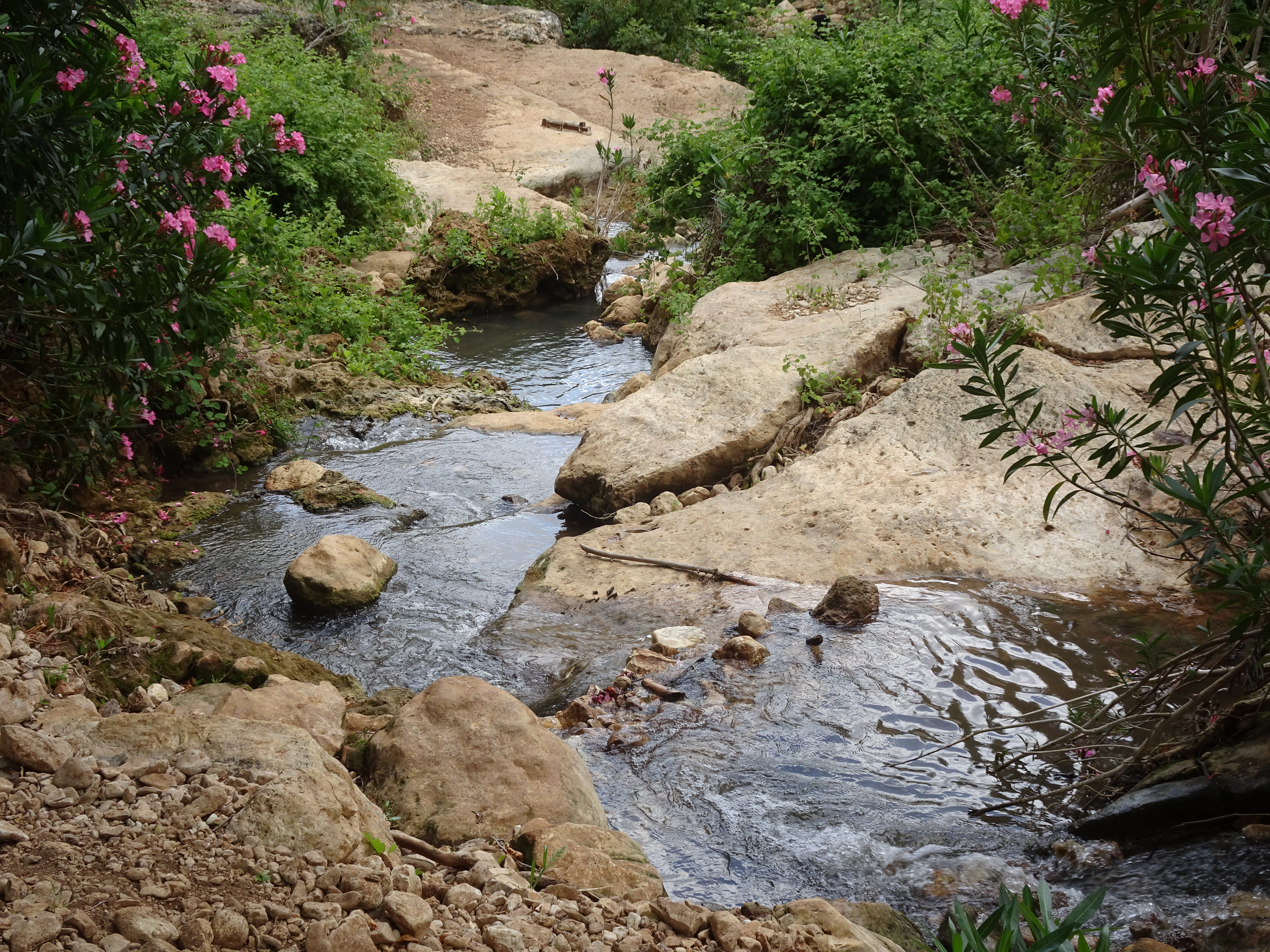
Nahal Betzet

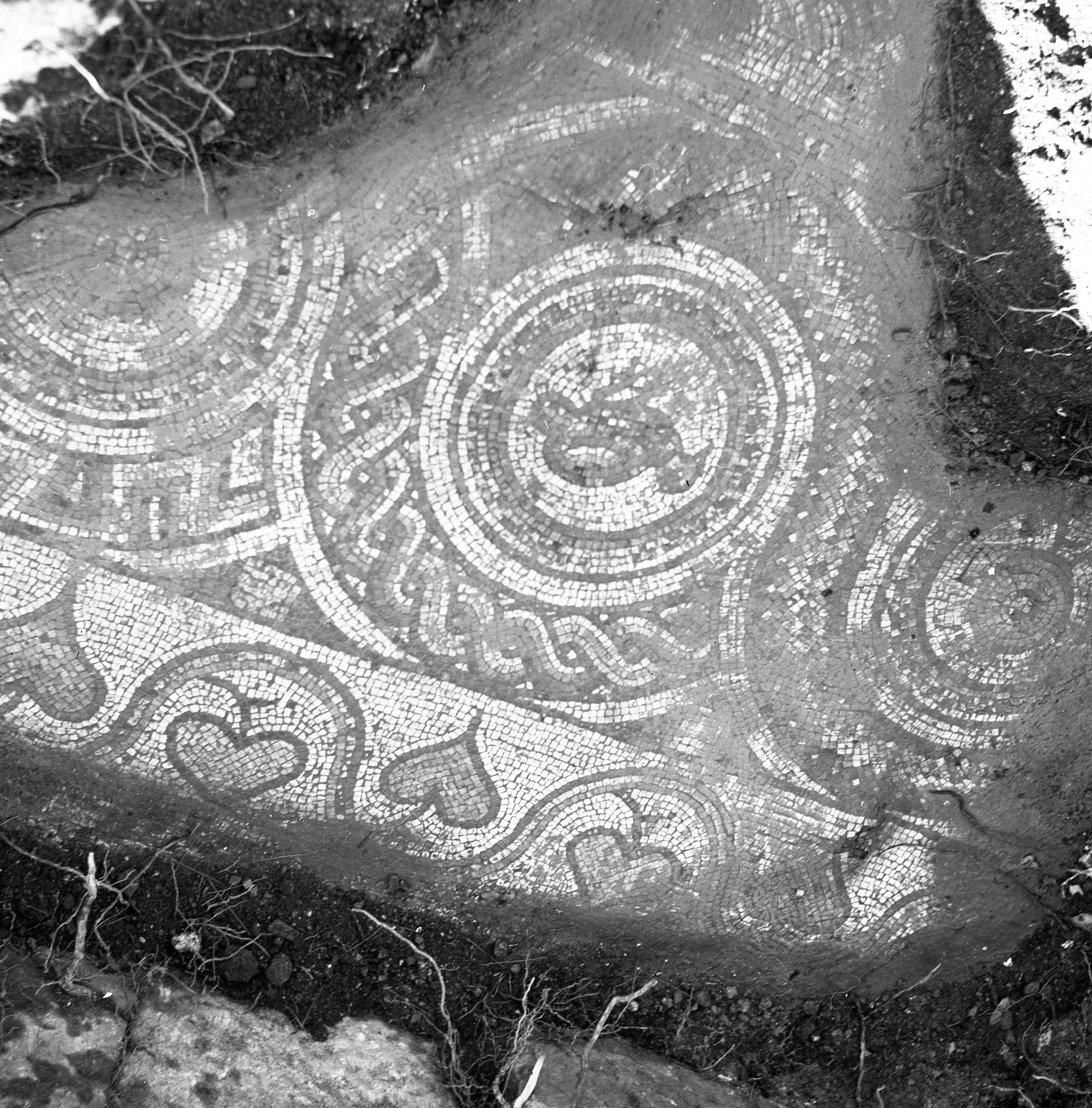
Ruins at Nahal Betzet, identified as Khirbet Karkara, an archaeological site in Israel.

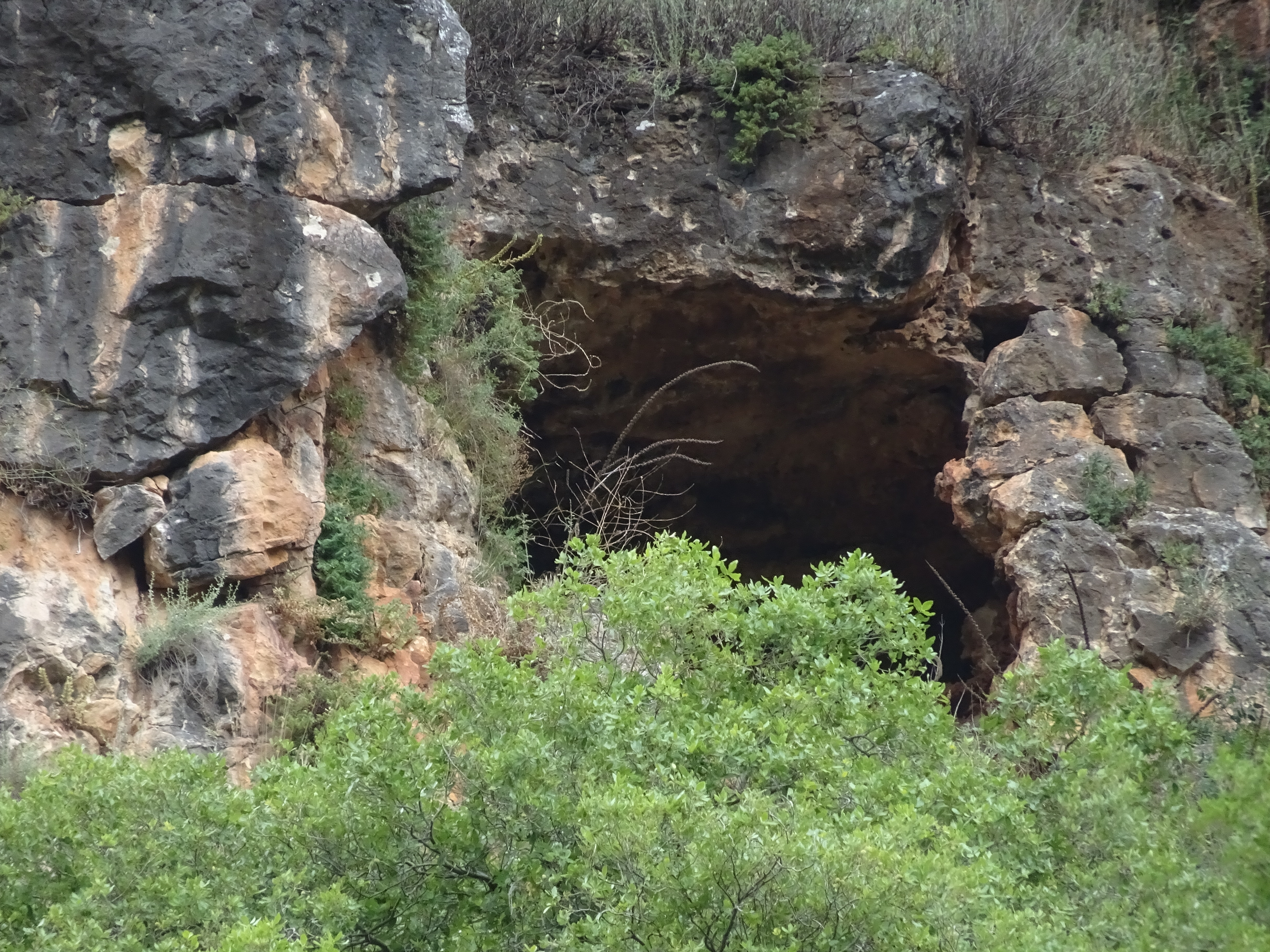
Sarach Cave, a stalactite cave home to insect-eating bats, where visitors are advised not to disturb the bats.

== See also ==
- List of rivers of Israel
