= Konrad Schmid (theologian) =

Swiss university teacher (born 1965)

Konrad Schmid (born 23 October 1965) is professor of Ancient Judaism and the Hebrew Bible at the University of Zurich in Switzerland.

== Biography ==
Konrad Schmid is the son of the Old Testament professor and theologian Hans Heinrich Schmid (1937–2014), who also taught at the Universität Zürich. Between 1985 and 1990 he completed his studies in theology at the University of Zurich, Greifswald, and Munich, and received his Ph.D. in Theology at Zurich in 1995. From 1999–2002 he was Professor of Hebrew Bible at the University of Heidelberg, Germany. He served as Member in Residence at the Center of Theological Inquiry, Princeton (2006–07) and was a Fellow of the Israel Institute for Advanced Studies in Jerusalem (2012–2013), co-directing a research group on Convergence and Divergence in Pentateuchal Theory: Bridging the Academic Cultures in Israel, North America, and Europe. In 2017, he was a member of the Institute for Advanced Study in Princeton. Since 2017, he serves as president of the Wissenschaftliche Gesellschaft für Theologie and as member of the National Research Council of the Swiss National Science Foundation.

== Publications (selection) ==
- Schmid, K. (2010). Genesis and the Moses Story. Israel’s Dual Origins in the Hebrew Bible. (J.D. Nogalski, trans.). Winona Lake: Eisenbrauns. ISBN 978-1-57506-152-8.
- Schmid, K. (2012). The Old Testament: A Literary History. (L. Maloney, trans.). Minneapolis: Fortress Press. ISBN 978-0-8006-9775-4.
- Schmid, K. (2015). Is There Theology in the Hebrew Bible? (subtitled, 'Critical Studies in the Hebrew Bible'). Winona Lake: Eisenbrauns. ISBN 978-1-57506-351-5.
- Schmid, K. (2019). A Historical Theology of the Hebrew Bible. (P. Altmann, trans.). Grand Rapids: Eerdmans. ISBN 978-0802876935.
- Schmid, K. & Schröter, J. (2021). The Making of the Bible: From the First Fragments to Sacred Scripture. (P. Lewis, trans.). Cambridge: Belknap Press. ISBN 978-0674248380.
