= Har HaAri =

Mountain in Israel

Coordinates: 32°57′19″N 35°22′00″E

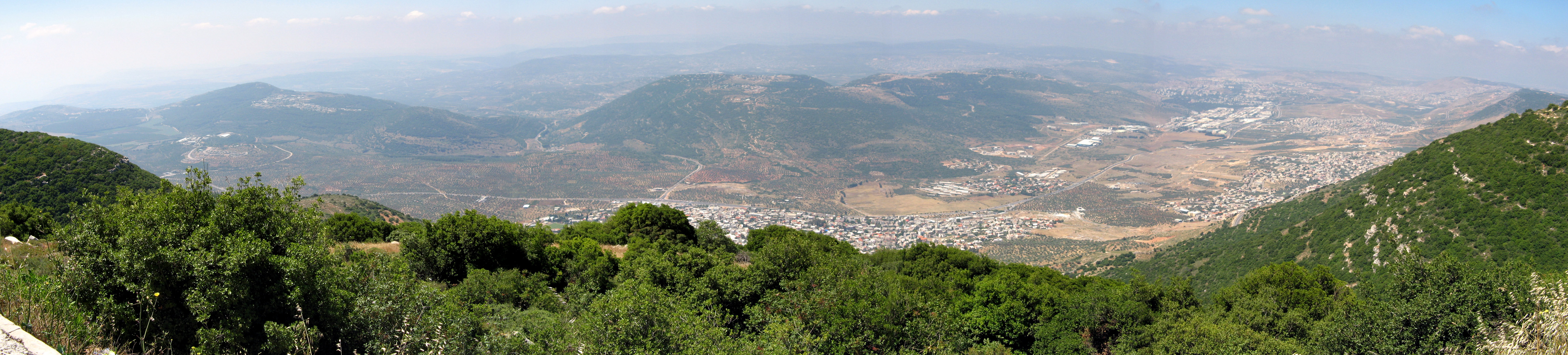
Panorama from Har HaAri looking southwards. The large town in the middle is Rameh and the hill after it is Mount Kamon

Har HaAri (Hebrew: הר הארי, Lion Mountain; Arabic: جبل حيدر, Mount Haidar) is a mountain in the Upper Galilee in northern Israel.

== History ==
With its 1047 meters (3435 ft) it is one of the highest mountains in Israel and is located about 1 kilometer south of Beit Jann. It is close to the Druze shrine of Baha' ad-Din, probably dedicated to the founding Druze leader of this name.

The mountain is a popular place for paragliding in part because of the landscape visible from there. On a clear day you can see the Gilboa Mountains and the Mediterranean Sea from it.

== Climate ==
Har HaAri has a Mediterranean climate with hot summers and cold, damp and sometimes snowy winters. Its altitude makes it vulnerable to strong winds at any time of the year. The precipitation rate on the mountain is high and reaches nearly 1000 mm. Most precipitation falls between October and May.

== Geography ==
Har HaAri is located in the Upper Galilee and is 1047 meters (3435 ft) high. Note that the directions of the geographic location navbar at the bottom of the article are reversed to fit the view of the panorama.

== See also ==
- Geography of Israel
