= Keshet Cave =

Natural arch in Israel

Coordinates: 33.077°N 35.19614°E

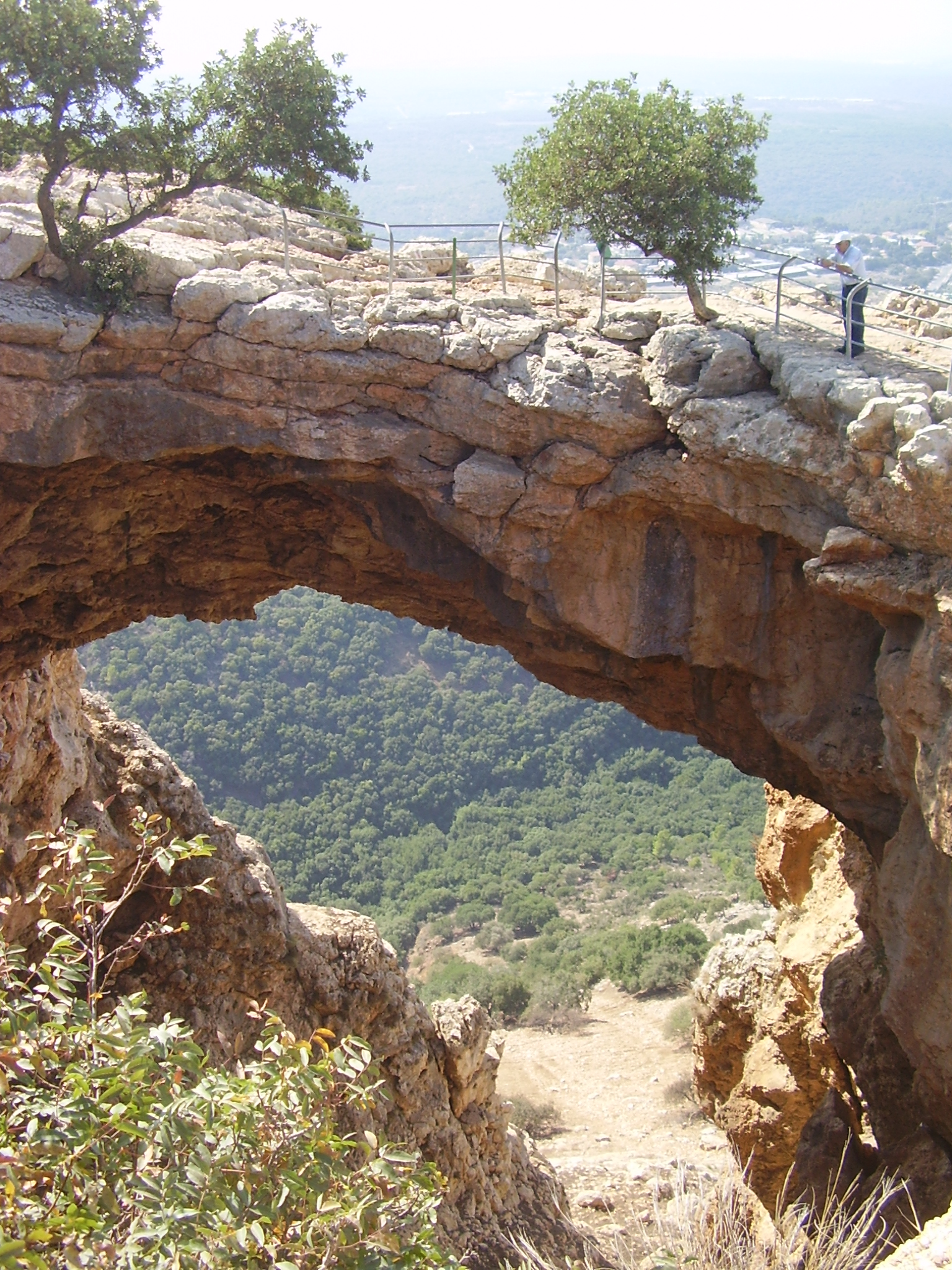
Keshet Cave

The Keshet Cave (Hebrew: מערת קשת, romanized: m'ara keshet; Arabic: مغارة القوس, romanized: maghārat al-qaws; both meaning Arch Cave) is a natural arch on a ridge by the northern bank of Betzet Stream, Upper Galilee, Israel. The cave is located near Adamit Park in the Betzet Stream Nature Reserve, close to the border with Lebanon.

== History ==
Keshet Cave is a remnant of a large collapsed karst cave and is a narrow strip of rock overhanging a deep abyss.

Accessed from Route 8993, the cave is a tourist attraction. It has also attracted the attention of rock climbers. At the end of 2012 it was opened for sports climbing, however the climbing website 26crags.com had the info about the cave replaced with the notice that rock climbing was prohibited in the area.

== See also ==
- List of caves in Israel
- Geography of Israel
