= Horvat Tefen =

Ancient fortress in northern Israel

- חורבת תפן (Hebrew) قلعة الطفانية (Arabic)
- Kulat et Tufaniyeh, Kala't Toufanieh, Tefen Fortress
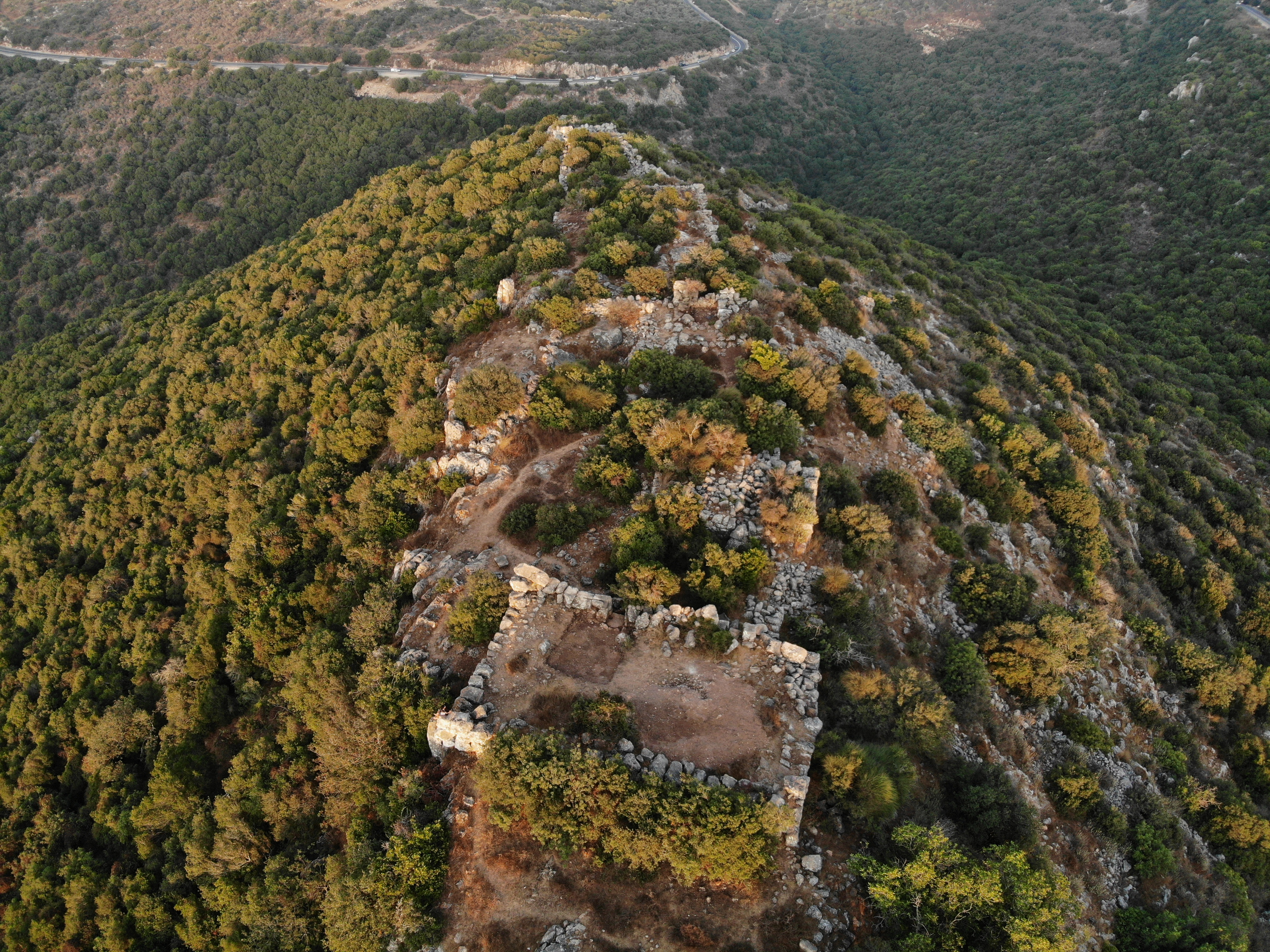
- Aerial view of the fortress

- Location within Israel
- 32°57′06.7″N 35°15′21.4″E
- Type: Fortress
- Periods: Late Hellenistic (Hasmonean) period (main phase as a Hasmonean fortress); Byzantine period (agricultural reuse)
- Location: Northern District, Israel
- Region: Western Galilee

History
- Built: 85–76 BCE
- Built by: Alexander Jannaeus (probable)

Site notes
- Excavation dates: 2019
- Archaeologists: Victor Guérin, Claude Reignier Conder, Herbert H. Kitchener, Adam Druks, Moshe Justus, Rafael Frankel, Nimrod Getzov, Ze'ev Safrai, Uzi Leibner, Roi Sabar

Horvat Tefen (Hebrew: חורבת תפן) or Qal'at et-Tufaniya (Arabic: قلعة الطفانية, lit. 'castle of the flood'), alternatively Tefen Fortress, is an archaeological site in the Western Galilee region of northern Israel. Located on a mountain ridge approximately 16 kilometres (9.9 mi) from the coastal city of Acre, the site contains the remains of a short-lived hilltop fort dating to the early 1st century BCE. Excavations conducted in 2019 have made it possible to identify the site as a Hasmonean military installation.

The fortification follows the narrow and irregular contours of the hilltop. Its architectural layout consists of seven rectangular towers of varying sizes, linked by curtain walls to form a continuous defensive perimeter. Access to the interior was limited to a single western gate, which featured a double-leaved door secured by sliding bar mechanisms. To sustain its garrison in an area devoid of natural springs, the fort relied on four large reservoirs.

The site was first documented in the 19th century by explorers such as Victor Guérin and members of the Survey of Western Palestine (SWP). Surveys conducted throughout the 20th century suggested it was a Hellenistic initiative by the people of Acre (then the Phoenician city of Akko-Ptolemais), who built it as a defensive measure against the expanding Hasmonean Kingdom of Judea following its conquest of Galilee. However, discoveries from the 2019 excavation, including the finding of overwhelmingly Hasmonean coins minted during the reign of Alexander Jannaeus in the fort's foundational levels, indicate that the site was constructed by the Hasmoneans.

The purpose of the fort is now believed to have been securing the northwestern border of the Hasmonean state against Acre. Following several centuries of abandonment, the site saw a revival during the Byzantine period (5th–7th centuries CE), when it was repurposed for agricultural use, likely serving as a winepress, as indicated by the discovery of numerous coarse tesserae and Byzantine pottery.

== Geography ==
Horvat Tefen occupies a hilltop ridge approximately 530 meters above sea level in the Western Galilee. It is located about 16 kilometers east of Acre (ancient Akko-Ptolemais). Steep slopes and deep wadis protect the site on three sides, while access is restricted to a narrow western saddle.

The site covers roughly 2.6 dunams (0.0026 km^{2}; 0.0010 sq mi) and conforms to the natural contours of the ridge. Its position provides a strategic vantage over the surrounding terrain and toward the Mediterranean coast.

== Archaeology ==
The fortress consists of seven rectangular towers connected by solid curtain walls, constructed from local fieldstones without mortar. Tower dimensions vary, and some preserve doorways made of dressed stone with drafted margins. The largest tower, a massive bastion located on the west side, measures 11.5 by 18.5 metres (38 by 61 ft). A single formal gate, equipped with sophisticated locking mechanisms for double doors, controlled access from the west.

Due to the absence of nearby springs (the closest being approximately 2 kilometres (1.2 mi) away) the garrison relied on rainwater harvesting. Four reservoirs, two within the fortress and two outside, were cut into the bedrock to collect and store water.

Finds from the site, uncovered in the 2019 excavations, are dominated by material from the late Hellenistic period. These include locally produced cooking and storage vessels typical of Galilee, with parallels at Gamla, Yodfat, and Kafr Kanna, as well as imported tableware of the Terra Sigillata A type, likely originating in northern Syria. Additional finds include glass bowls comparable to those from Hasmonean-period Gamla and various metal objects. Imported amphora fragments from Rhodes, Kos and Knidos, consistent with patterns from the reign of Jannaeus onwards, also support a date in the early 1st century BCE. Excavations uncovered identifiable 49 coins, 47 of which are Hasmonean and date to the 80s–70s BCE, consistent with the period of Alexander Jannaeus. The remaining coins include a civic coin from Akko-Ptolemais, depicting Tyche/Astarte and dating to the late 2nd or early 1st century BCE, and a 5th-century CE coin, believed to be intrusive and associated with the agricultural reuse of the site during the Byzantine period.

After centuries of abandonment, limited reuse occurred during the Byzantine period (5th to 7th centuries CE), likely for agricultural purposes. This phase is represented by pottery, tesserae, and installations consistent with rural production, probably indicating the existence of a winepress in the area.

== Research and assessment ==
The site was first documented by 19th-century explorers. Among these early visitors was Victor Guérin, who documented the site as Kala't Toufanieh; he described the place as a small fortress constructed from large rectangular blocks and noted that the dense undergrowth around it made examining the site extremely difficult. He also mentioned that the fortress had been supplied with water by several cisterns. In the 1880s, Claude Reignier Conder and Herbert H. Kitchener of the Palestine Exploration Fund (PEF) documented the site under the name Kulat et Tufaniyeh. They noted "A ruined square tower of large roughly-hewn masonry," and added that "it has an appearance of great age; there are also a small rock-cut birket and two sarcophagi."

In 1962, Adam Druks and Moshe Justus conducted a survey of the site. Another survey in the 1980s, led by Rafael Frankel and Nimrod Getzov, concluded that Horvat Tefen was constructed in the late 2nd century BCE by the inhabitants of Acre, as a defensive measure against the expanding Hasmonean kingdom, which had already taken control of Galilee; under this interpretation, the fort was later captured by the Hasmoneans under Alexander Jannaeus and remained in use into the early Roman period. In the 1970s, Ze'ev Safrai and his team from Bar-Ilan University described the site as a fortified settlement from the Hellenistic era. Most recently, in 2019, Uzi Leibner of the Hebrew University of Jerusalem conducted a survey attributing the construction of the site to the Hasmoneans.

Also in 2019, the site was excavated for the first time, by a team from the Hebrew University, led by Roi Sabar. Excavations focused on selected towers and wall junctions to establish chronology and function, with work carried out inside towers to uncover underlying assemblages that could clarify construction dates. The findings indicated that Horvat Tefen was established by the Hasmoneans during the reign of Alexander Jannaeus, specifically around 85–76 BCE. The Hasmonean kingdom, which emerged from the Maccabean Revolt against Seleucid rule, expanded significantly during the 2nd and 1st centuries BCE, including the conquest of Galilee. The excavators suggest that Horvat Tefen formed part of a network of fortifications designed to secure Hasmonean control and monitor border areas; other sites in this network included Keren Naftali and Khirbet Rushmiyeh in the northwestern region. The fort likely functioned in relation to the coastal city of Acre, an autonomous Phoenician city that was in conflict with the Hasmoneans, as Alexander Jannaeus had previously failed to capture it. GIS-based viewshed analysis supports this interpretation, showing that the fort's main line of sight covers Acre and its surroundings. The fortress was occupied only briefly, primarily during the later years of Jannaeus's reign, and was subsequently abandoned.

== See also ==
- Alexandrium
- Horvat Mazad
- Hyrcania (fortress)
- Khirbet Mudayna as-Saliya
- Masada
- Qeren Naftali fortress

== Bibliography ==
=== Sources ===
- Aviam, Mordechai (2007). "Archaeology and History: What Archaeology Can Show about Ethnic and Religious Regions in Ancient Galilee". Historical Knowledge in Biblical Antiquity. Leiden, The Netherlands: Brill. pp. 196–215. doi:10.1163/9789004397491_010.
- Conder, C. R.; Kitchener, H. H. (1881). The Survey of Western Palestine: Memoirs of the Topography, Orography, Hydrography, and Archaeology. Vol. 1. London: Committee of the Palestine Exploration Fund. p. 190.
- Guérin, Victor (1880). Description Géographique Historique et Archéologique de la Palestine (in French). Vol. 3: Galilee, pt. 1. Paris: L'Imprimerie Nationale. pp. 442–443.
- Sabar, Roi (2022). "Ḥorvat Tefen: A Hasmonean Fortress in the Hinterland of 'Akko-Ptolemais". Bulletin of the American Schools of Oriental Research (387): 55–85. doi:10.1086/719185.
