= Horbat Mazruq =

Archaeological site in Israel

- Location within Israel
- 31°47′56″N 35°06′13″E
- Type: village, underground hiding complex, rock-cut tombs
- Periods: Hellenistic (Hasmonean), Roman periods
- Cultures: Second Temple Judaism
- Location: Jerusalem District, Israel
- Region: Judaean Mountains
- New Israel Grid: 210/634

History
- Built: 2nd century BCE
- Abandoned: First Jewish–Roman War

Site notes
- Height: c. 700 m
- Excavation dates: 2009, 2014
- Archaeologists: Daniel Ein-Mor, Eyal Marco and Pablo Betzer
- Discovered: 2009
- Condition: In ruins

Horbat Mazruq is an archaeological site located in the Judaean Mountains of modern-day Israel, near the villages of Abu Ghosh and Kiryat Ye'arim. Situated along an ancient Roman road connecting Emmaus and Jerusalem, the site encompasses the remains of a Jewish village that seems to have flourished from the late 2nd century BCE until its abandonment around the destruction of Jerusalem in 70 CE.

The site, first discovered in 2009, is home to a large underground hiding complex, which includes narrow passageways and rock-cut shafts, likely used during the First Jewish–Roman War (66–70/73 CE). Additional finds include rock-cut tombs, domestic artifacts, and a hoard of 114 coins from the fourth year of the revolt (69/70 CE), which, according to the excavators, was likely hidden by someone during a reconnaissance mission.

== Location ==
The site of Horbat Mazruq is located on a terraced spur descending from the Kiryat Ye'arim ridge, which is crowned by the tell of the biblical city Kiriath-Jearim, and slopes down toward the Nahal Kesalon ravine. It is located near a section of the Roman road from Emmaus to Jerusalem, close to the modern village of Abu Ghosh. This road is believed to have been the route taken by Legio V Macedonica during the First Jewish–Roman War, after the legion camped at Emmaus in 68 CE, before advancing to lay siege to Jerusalem.

== Research history ==
Horbat Mazruq came to light in 2009 after archaeological looting caused significant damage to the site. Later that year, the Israel Antiquities Authority conducted a survey and a small excavation led by archaeologist Daniel Ein Mor. In February 2014, another portion of the site, located 200 meters away from the initial excavations, was excavated during salvage work for the widening of Highway 1, which passes nearby. The excavation was conducted by Eyal Marco and Pablo Betzer of the Israel Antiquities Authority.

The site was named "Horbat Mazruq" (the Ruin of Mazruq), based on a nearby spring called 'Ein el Mazrūq, which appears on British Mandate-era maps. The name Mazrūq is likely a phonetic error, and the original name was probably Marzūq, which in Arabic means "blessed, fortunate, prosperous", etc. The spring area was excavated in 2011, revealing parts of an ancient irrigation system. Most of the potsherds discovered at the site date from the Iron Age and the early Roman period.

== Archaeology ==
Excavations uncovered remains of a Jewish village from the late Second Temple period. The site was inhabited from the late second century BCE, possibly founded during the reign of Hasmonean king Alexander Jannaeus (104–76 BCE), and continued through the First Jewish Revolt, with activity ceasing around the destruction of Jerusalem in 70 CE.

Among the findings were two small buildings with rock-cut shafts leading to subterranean spaces, as well as a more extensive, 550 sqm underground hiding complex that sealed earlier water installations, such as cisterns and a plastered reservoir, which may have served as a mikveh (Jewish ritual bath). The hiding complex features narrow passageways and a stone blocking device, common characteristics of hideouts found in the Shephelah (Judaean Lowlands), the Hebron Hills, the Bethel area, and Galilee during this period.

Although "developed" hiding complexes in Judaea are more commonly associated with the later Bar Kokhba revolt (132–136 CE), the layout and the dated finds (though excluding a single Trajanic coin) along with the fact that the nearby area was occupied by Roman soldiers after the First Jewish Revolt, particularly with a Roman camp established in Abu Ghosh around 71/72 CE, make it more likely that the complex dates to the First Jewish Revolt.

=== Rock-cut tombs ===
Located 350 meters above a steep ravine to the northwest, four rock-cut burial caves with loculi (burial niches) were recorded; a near-complete piriform bottle points to first-century CE use. These burial caves are similar to those found in Jerusalem and the Shephelah, and are dated to the early Roman period.

=== Domestic finds ===
Finds at Horbat Mazruq include domestic artifacts such as a tabun (clay oven), basalt mortars, grinding stones, Hasmonean and Herodian lamps, and cooking pots, which are consistent with assemblages from first-century BCE to CE Jerusalem, Jericho, Masada, and refuge caves. An earlier find includes a rim of a 7th-century BCE (Iron Age) bowl.

=== Weaponry, bones and coinage ===
In 2009, an iron blade fragment was discovered, as well as adult human bones, and 25 coins. The coins include one from the reign of Alexander Jannaeus and another from the second year of the First Jewish Revolt (67/68 CE); the latter was discovered under a layer of collapsed rubble.

In the 2014 excavations, 114 coins from the fourth year of the First Jewish Revolt (69/70 CE) were found. All are bronze, in excellent condition (as they were uncirculated), and feature the same type: a chalice on the obverse and a lulav alongside two etrogs on the reverse, with the inscription "for the redemption of Zion" (לגאלת ציון) and the date "year four." They were discovered alongside a ceramic juglet, which may have originally contained the coins. According to the excavators, Ariel, Marco, and Betzer, the hoard was likely hidden by someone on a reconnaissance mission, rather than a refugee fleeing Jerusalem, as he headed westward toward Roman-controlled territory.

== See also ==
- First Jewish Revolt coinage
- Horvat 'Ethri
- Horvat 'Eqed
- Horvat Mazad
- Te'omim Cave

== Bibliography ==
- Ariel, Donald T.; Marco, Eyal; Betzer, Pablo (2018). "A Hoard of First Jewish Revolt Coins Found near Ḥorbat Mazruq (Abu Ghosh)". Strata BAIAS. 36: 11–35.
- Ein Mor, Daniel (2022). "Remains of a Rural Settlement from the Late Hellenistic–Early Roman Periods and a Hiding Complex from the Roman Period at Ḥorbat Mazruq near Abu Ghosh (with a contribution by Donald T. Ariel)". 'Atiqot. 108. doi:10.70967/2948-040X.1152.
- Ein Mor, Daniel; Storchan, Benyamin; Levy, Danit; Landes-Nagar, Annette (2019). "חידושים בתמונה היישובית לאורך הדרך אמאוס–קריית יערים–ירושלים" [The Settlement Pattern along the Emmaus- Kiryat Ye’arim -Jerusalem Road: In Light of New Archaeological Evidence from the 2nd century BCE until the 2nd century CE]. Studies on the Land of Judea (in Hebrew). 4: 47–71.
- Farhi, Yoav; Finkelstein, Israel; Kirilov, Yana; Römer, Thomas (2021). "Kiriath-jearim from the Ptolemaic Period to the Bar Kokhba Revolt in Light of the Numismatic Finds". Semitica. 63: 203–222.
