= Qeren Naftali fortress =

- קרן נפתלי (Hebrew); Khirbet el-Ḥarrawi (Arabic)
- Keren Naftali fortress, Khurbet Ḥarrawi
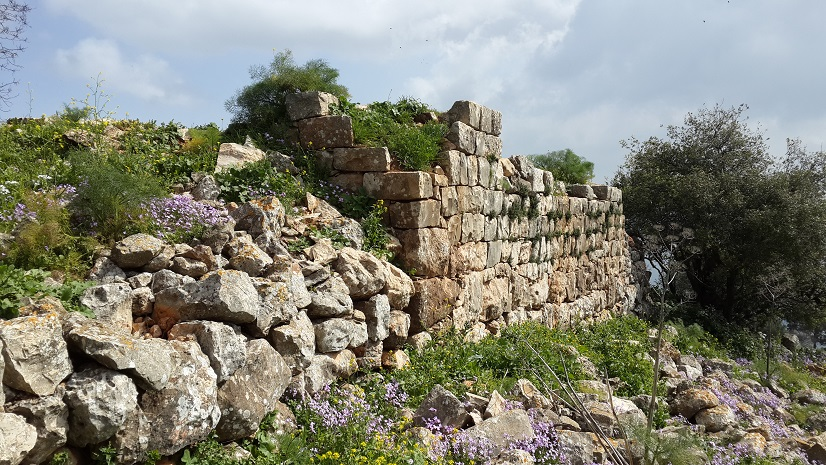
- Northeastern tower wall of the fortress

- Location within Israel
- 33°05′26.9″N 35°33′45.5″E
- Type: Fortress
- Periods: Hellenistic, Hasmonean, Herodian, early Roman, late antiquity
- Cultures: Phoenician, Jewish, Greco-Roman
- Location: Eastern Upper Galilee, Israel
- Region: Upper Galilee
- Nearest city: Ramot Naftali
- Israeli Transverse Mercator: 252/777

History
- Built: 3rd/2nd century BCE

Site notes
- Material: Stone
- Elevation: 510 metres (1,670 ft)
- Length: 110 metres (360 ft)
- Width: 40 metres (130 ft)
- Excavation dates: 1981, 2000
- Archaeologists: Mordechai Aviam
- Condition: In ruins

The Qeren Naftali fortress, also spelled Keren Naftali, also known as Khirbet el-Ḥarrawi or Khurbet Ḥarrawi, is an ancient fortress in the eastern Upper Galilee region of northern Israel. It sits atop Qeren Naftali peak, 492 metres (1,614 ft) above sea level, southeast of the modern village of Ramot Naftali and across a narrow vale from the ancient city of Kedesh, with which it shares clear lines of sight. From its summit, the site commands views of the Hula Valley directly below, Mount Hermon to the north, and the Golan Heights plateau beyond.

The fortress was built during the Hellenistic period as part of the defensive network protecting Kedesh, then an administrative center of the Phoenician city of Tyre. During this period, it controlled routes through the Hula Valley and onward toward Tyre via Tibnin. It was captured by Hasmonean Judea during a military campaign most commonly associated with King Alexander Jannaeus. The fort was subsequently garrisoned by Jewish soldiers, whose presence is attested by Hasmonean coins and a mikveh (Jewish ritual bath). The site appears to have later fallen under Herodian control, with archaeological evidence pointing to a siege; following the Roman conquest, the mikveh was repurposed as refuse pit, and finds such as figurative oil lamps and non-kosher animals suggest a non-Jewish garrison occupied the fortress. In late antiquity, during the 2nd and 3rd centuries CE, the site was inhabited by a pagan population, as indicated by dedicatory inscriptions to Greek deities.

The site has drawn scholarly attention since the 1880s, beginning with Victor Guérin's visit and a subsequent survey by C. R. Conder and H. H. Kitchener of the Palestine Exploration Fund; in the 1990s and 2000s, surveys by the Israel Antiquities Authority headed by Mordechai Aviam have refined the fortress's chronology and layout.

== Geography ==
The citadel was built on a steep hill 492 metres (1,614 ft) above sea level in eastern Upper Galilee. It rises approximately 410 metres (1,350 ft) above the Hula Valley to the east and 60 metres (200 ft) above the plain to the west. The peak is part of the Ramim Ridge. From the summit, Mount Hermon and the Beqaa Valley are visible to the north, the Hula Valley and Mount Canaan to the south, the Golan Heights plateau to the east, and the Qedesh Valley to the west.

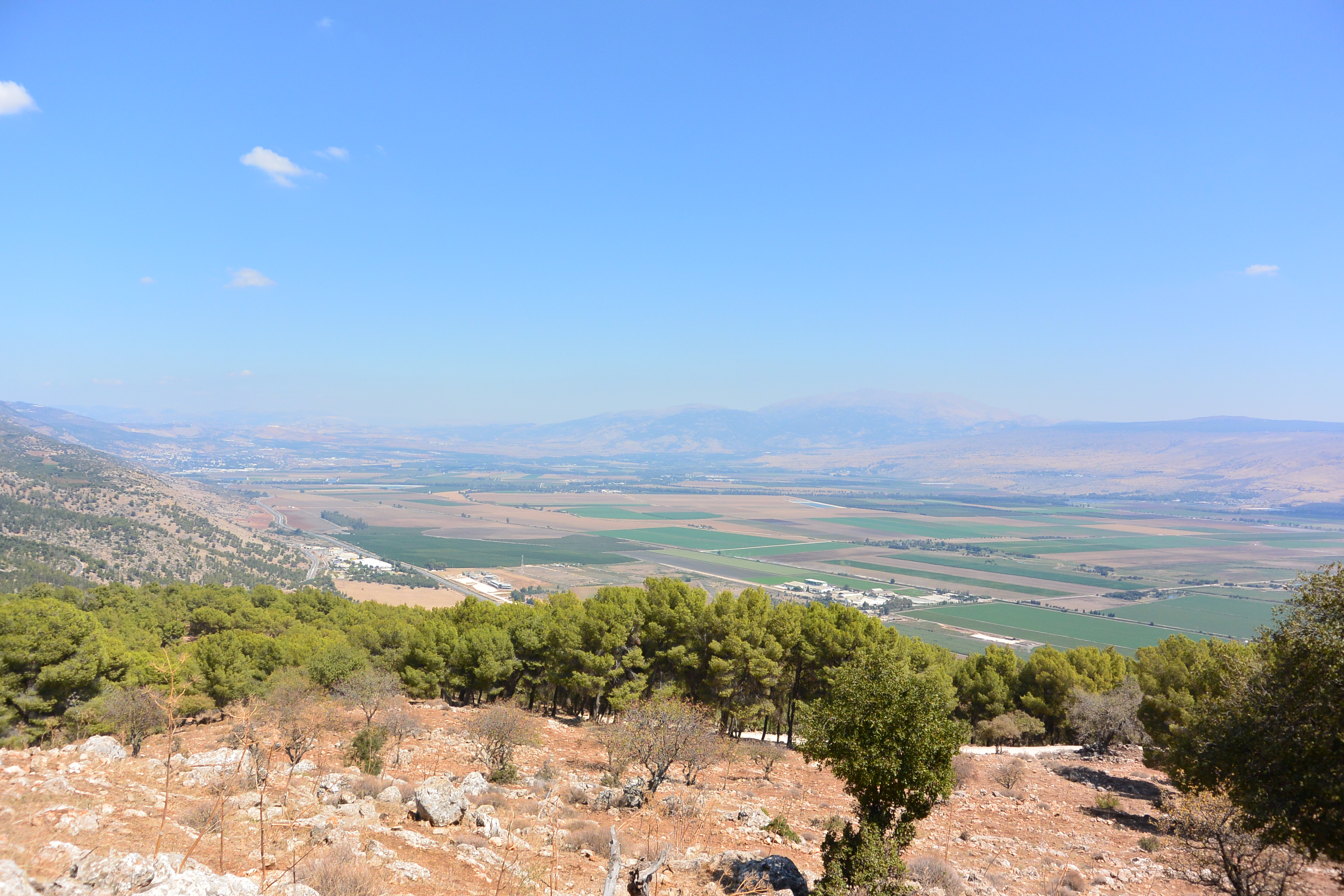
View to the northeast across the Hula Valley, with Mount Hermon in the distance

The modern village of Ramot Naftali is located to the west.

== History ==
=== Hellenistic period ===
According to the site's excavator, Mordechai Aviam, the fortress was built during the Hellenistic period, in the third or second century BCE, at the initiative of the leaders of the Phoenician city of Tyre—located further west, on the Mediterranean coast of what is now southern Lebanon. In his view, it was built to defend Kedesh, which was then an important administrative center for Tyre. Below the fortress are the ruins of a settlement with pottery dating from the Hellenistic period and the early and middle Roman periods.

Kedesh itself sits just across the Kedesh valley from Qeren Naftali, two kilometers to the west, and the two locations are intervisible. The fortress controlled the highway running along the Hula Valley (and the large Einan spring), as well as the route leading from the Hula Valley through Kedesh to Tibnin and on to Tyre.

The fortress was constructed to match the natural shape of the summit on which it sits, stretching about 110 metres (360 ft) in length. Its width varies along this axis: it is narrower in the north, at 29 metres (95 ft), widest in the south, at 50 metres (160 ft), and measures about 40 metres (130 ft) across in the middle section. Two corner towers in the north, each roughly 9 by 9 meters, match the dimensions of a known Hellenistic-era tower at Tel Dor. Along the western side, three rectangular towers jut out about 5 meters from the wall line, and a corresponding tower survives on the eastern side. The southernmost western tower, about 11 meters long, matches the size of other known Hellenistic towers at Tel Dor and at Yodefat.

The southeastern section is buried under the collapse of Arab-period houses, making the wall line untraceable there. The surviving southern and western walls reach a maximum height of about 2 metres (6.6 ft), with thickness measurable only near one western tower, at about 2.8 metres (9.2 ft). On the north, west, and south sides, the walls and towers were later reinforced with an outer wall 2.8–3 meters away, the gap filled with loose fieldstones. At least one major interior wall crosses the fortress from west to east.

Two Tyrian coins from the late Hellenistic period were found.

=== Hasmonean period ===
The Jewish historian Josephus describes a battle that took place in Kedesh, in which Jonathan Apphus, brother and successor of Judas Maccabeus, fought the Seleucid king Demetrius II Nicator. The Qeren Naftali fortress was captured by Hasmonean Judea during its conquest of Upper Galilee a few decades later, by either Hyrcanus I, Aristobulus I, or, according to the most widespread view, Alexander Jannaeus.

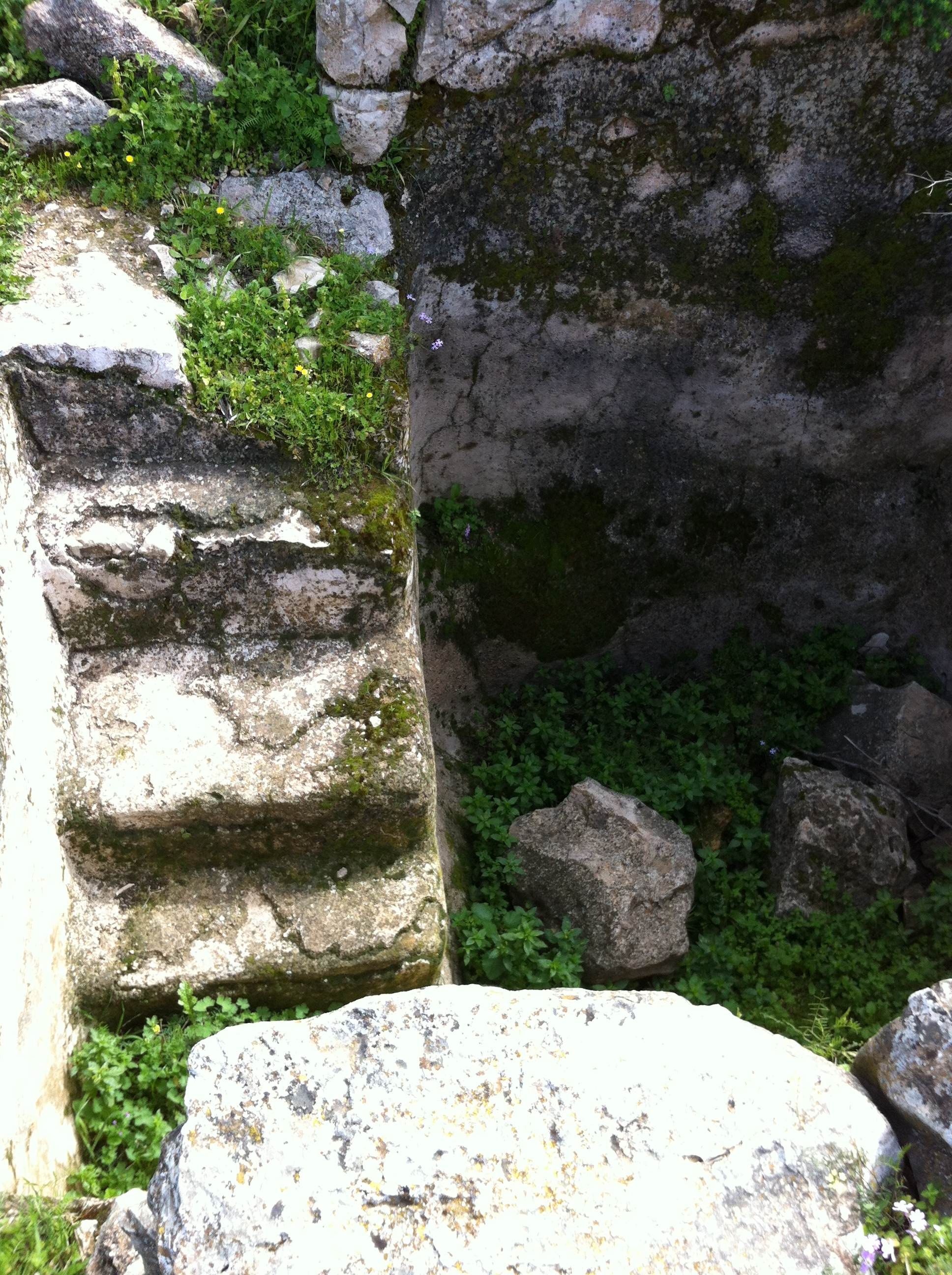
Stairway to the Jewish ritual bath (mikveh)

The presence of a Jewish garrison at the site is attested by five coins of the Alexander Jannaeus type and a Jewish ritual bath, or mikveh. This stepped pool was found in the western part of the fortress, and its earliest remains date to the late second or early first century BCE. The plaster technology employed in the mikveh is closely comparable to that documented at several other contemporary mikvehs, including Sepphoris and Yodefat (in the Lower Galilee) and Horvat 'Ethri (in the Judaean Foothills). This similarity suggests the work of skilled specialists operating within a shared tradition, although the raw materials used for plaster production appear to have been sourced from nearby areas.

=== Herodian and early Roman periods ===
The Qeren Naftali fortress appears to have been conquered under Herod, who ruled Judaea as a client kingdom under Roman patronage (r. 37–4 BCE). Herod had already held administrative roles in Judaea earlier, during the ethnarchy of Hyrcanus II and the period when Herod's father, Antipater, was the dominant force in the polity; Josephus wrote that in 43 BCE, Herod expelled Marion of Tyre, who held three fortresses in Galilee, from the region. Later, circa 38 BCE, Herod conducted a campaign in Galilee against dissidents supportive of his rival to the throne, the Hasmonean leader Antigonus II Mattathias. According to Josephus, locals killed Herod's commander Ptolemy in a surprise attack and then took refuge in the swamps, likely those of the Hula Valley. Once informed, Herod launched a campaign in which he besieged and captured unnamed fortresses throughout Galilee.

The siege at Qeren Naftali is attested by a siege system, including large rolling stones and what appears to be a circumvallation wall surrounding the fortress from the south, east, and northeast. The rolling stones (seven in the southwest corner of the fortress, each about half a meter across, with three more discovered near the village at the base of the hill) are all similar in size, roughly cut and round in shape; one was weighed at about 156.5 kilograms. Aviam suggested that the siege could be attributed either to Herod's activities against Marion or to his war against the supporters of Antigonus.

After the Roman conquest, the mikveh was repurposed as a refuse pit, where animal bones (including non-kosher animals), ash, and 1st-century BCE pottery were found; these finds point to the settlement of a non-Jewish garrison at the site, a conclusion also supported by the presence of oil lamps decorated with figures (one showing wrestlers, another apparently depicting Aphrodite), notable since Jewish art of this period was largely aniconic.

Coins from the 1st century BCE include two coins from Tyre, one from Sidon, and one of Herod Philip minted in Paneas.

=== Late Roman period ===
The site yields evidence of pagan activity, including architectural fragments and two Greek inscriptions. One inscription, carved on a large and well-preserved stone lintel originally belonging to a doorway, refers to Athena and was interpreted as evidence that the structure had been a sanctuary dedicated to the goddess. The second, a fragmentary Greek inscription, was found reused in a later building and appears to have been a dedication to the Heliopolitan Zeus. Aviam suggested dating the Athena inscription to the 1st or 2nd century CE and the Zeus inscription to the 3rd century CE.

The site was damaged by the construction of homes in the early 20th century.

== Research history ==
The earliest scholar to visit the site was Victor Guérin, during his tour of the area in 1880; he identified it with the biblical city of Hazor, which today is identified instead with a site a few kilometers away, Tel Hazor. He documented details of the fortress as well as ruins of a settlement. In 1881, Palestine Exploration Fund (PEF) explorers Claude R. Conder and Herbert H. Kitchener visited the site. They confirmed Guérin's findings and also noted the presence of cisterns, a "zig-zag pathway" leading to the large spring of 'Ain al Mellahah, and rock-cut tombs with loculi. In 1908, Ernest Masterman discovered the stone dedicatory inscriptions to Athena and Zeus.

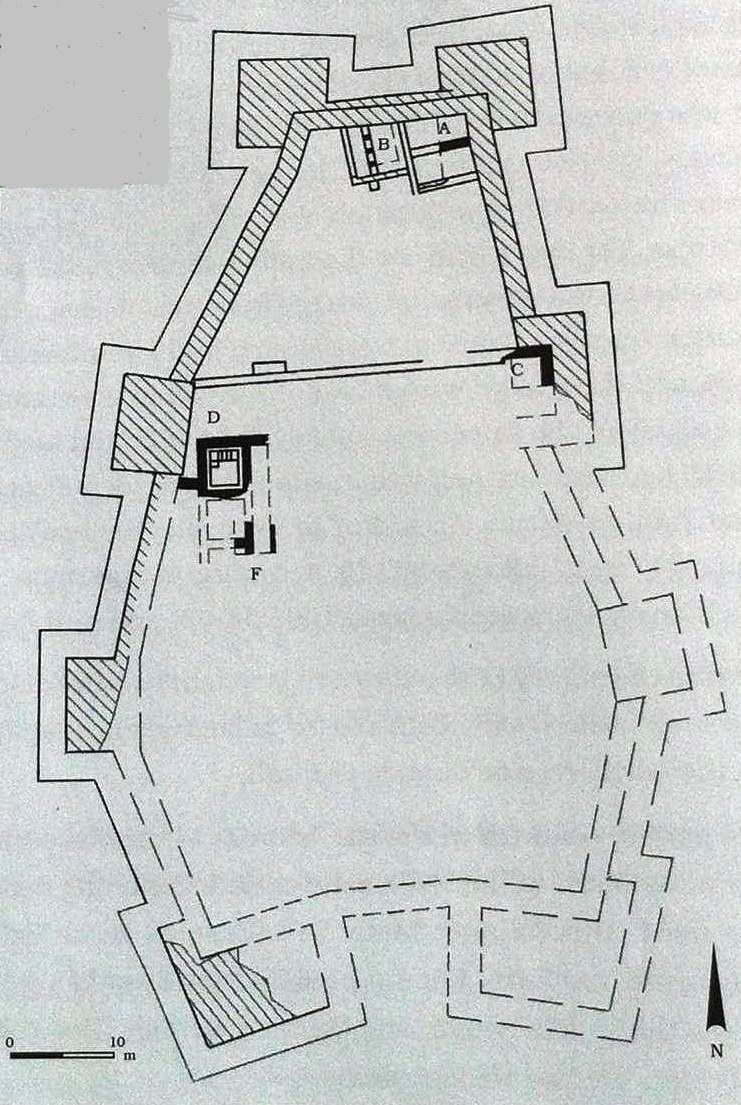
Plan of the fortress

In 1981, archaeologist Dan Bahat carried out a salvage excavation at the southern part of the site on behalf of the Israel Antiquities Authority (IAA). The dig uncovered a lime-plastered floor and a nearby depression interpreted as a refuse pit containing mainly Roman-period pottery, glass fragments, and possible stone remains of uncertain function. This was followed by a 1995 survey, also conducted by the IAA, headed by Mordechai Aviam. In 2000, Aviam led further IAA work at the site, this time as part of an excavation aiming at more precise dating of the fortress and its various periods, and connection to historical events.

== See also ==
- Horvat Tefen
- Horvat Mazad
- Khirbet Mudayna as-Saliya

== Bibliography ==
=== Sources ===
- Aviam, Mordechai (2004). "The Hellenistic and Hasmonean Fortress and Herodian Siege Complex at Qeren Naftali". In Aviam, Mordechai (ed.). Jews, Pagans, and Christians in the Galilee: 25 Years of Archaeological Excavations and Surveys, Hellenistic to Byzantine Periods. Rochester, NY: University of Rochester Press. pp. 59–88.
- Aviam, Mordechai (2014). "מצודת קרן נפתלי" [Qeren Naftali Fortress]. ממגדל נוצרים עד עיר מבצר [From Watch Tower to Fortified City] (PDF). Land of Galilee (in Hebrew). Vol. III. Kinneret Academic College: Ostracon Publishing. pp. 101–112.
- Aviam, Mordechai (2015). "The Transformation from Galil Ha-Goyim to Jewish Galilee: The Archaeological Testimony of an Ethnic Change". In Fiensy, David A.; Strange, James Riley (eds.). Galilee in the Late Second Temple and Mishnaic Periods: Volume 2, The Archaeological Record from Cities, Towns, and Villages. Fortress Press. pp. 9–21. ISBN 9781451467420.
- Bahat, Dan (1981). Dayan, Amir (ed.). "Keren Naftali (Harrawi) A-1047/1981". Favissa: Past Archaeological Excavation Reports. Israel Antiquities Authority.
- Bonnie, Rick; Holmqvist-Sipilä, Elisabeth; Kouki, Paula; Zissu, Boaz (2025). "Plasters from Jewish ritual purification baths in Late Hellenistic–Early Roman Palestine: composition, production areas, and anthropogenic residues". npj Heritage Science. 13 (1): 78. doi:10.1038/s40494-025-01594-1. hdl:10138/594099.
- Conder, Claude R.; Kitchener, Herbert H. (1881). The Survey of Western Palestine: Memoirs of the Topography, Orography, Hydrography, and Archaeology. Vol. 1. London: Committee of the Palestine Exploration Fund.
- Masterman, Ernest W. G. (1908). "Two Greek Inscriptions from Khurbet Harrawi". Palestine Exploration Quarterly. 20: 155–157.
