= Kishorit =

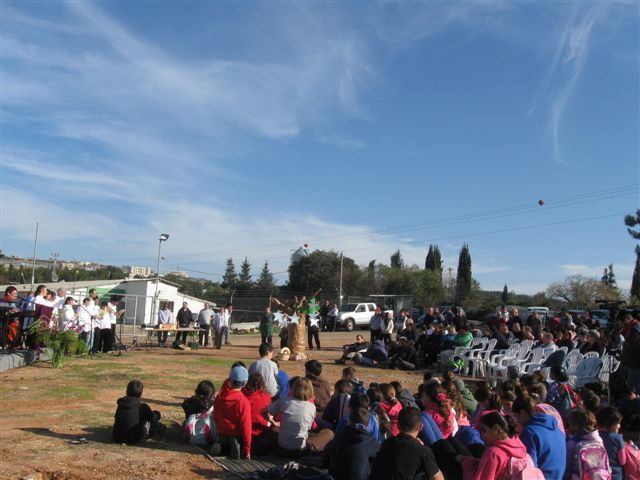
- Tu BiShvat celebration in the village in 2011

- Location within Northwest Israel
- Coordinates: 32°56′51″N 35°15′0″E
- Country: Israel
- District: Northern
- Subdistrict: Acre
- Council: Misgav
- Affiliation: Kibbutz Movement
- Founded: 1970s
- Founder: Hashomer Hatzair Members
- Population (2024): 234
- Website: www.kishorit.org.il

Kishorit (Hebrew: כישורית, lit. 'Distaff') is a kibbutz in northern Israel. Located in the Galilee near Karmiel, it falls under the jurisdiction of Misgav Regional Council. In 2024 it had a population of 234. Its members are all disabled adults.

== History ==
The kibbutz was originally founded in the late 1970s under the name Kishor, but was abandoned a few years later. In 1997 it was refounded as Kishorit, a kibbutz for individuals with special needs. Named after the Bible (Proverbs 31:19) together with the nearby kibbutz Pelekh, whose name is the corresponding word of the same sentence.

Kishorit provides its members with employment opportunities, leisure activities, private living quarters, medical supervision, nursing care and opportunities for social integration in Israeli society. All members are assigned work duty in the laundry room, kitchen or one of ten work centers. The centers, all headed by outside professionals, include an organic goat farm, a chicken coop, a toy factory and a dog kennel that breeds miniature schnauzers sold in Europe.

== See also ==
- Horvat Tefen – a nearby Hasmonean fortress
