= Pelekh =

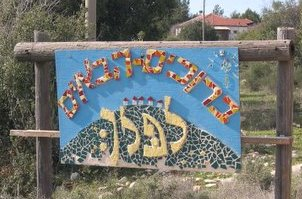

- Location within Northwest Israel
- Coordinates: 32°56′2″N 35°14′1″E
- Country: Israel
- District: Northern
- Subdistrict: Acre
- Council: Misgav
- Affiliation: Kibbutz Movement
- Founded: 1982
- Founder: Soviet Hashomer Hatzair members
- Population (2024): 215

Pelekh (Hebrew: פֶּלֶךְ, lit. 'Spindle') is a kibbutz in northern Israel. Located in the western Galilee near Karmiel, it falls under the jurisdiction of Misgav Regional Council.

== History ==
The village was founded in 1982 by a gar'in of Hashomer Hatzair members. It takes its name from a verse in the Book of Proverbs (31:19) together with the nearby kibbutz Kishorit, whose name appears the same sentence.

In its early years, the core families, immigrants from the former USSR, ran a chicken coop, cow shed and kiwi plantation.
