= Khirbet Mudayna as-Saliya =

Ancient fortress in central Jordan

- Khirbet al-Medeiyineh, Khirbet al-Mdejjene, el-Medeiyineh
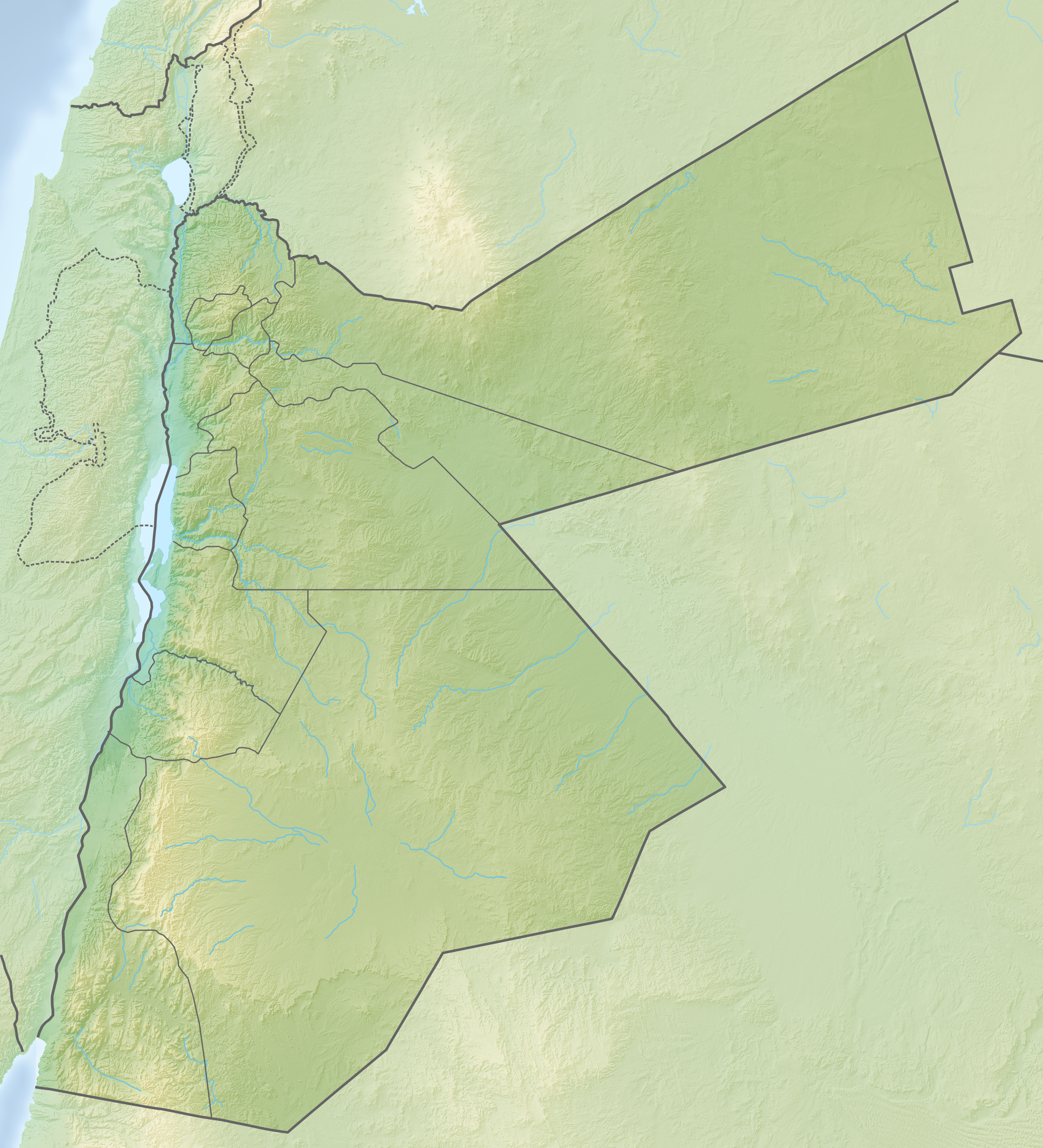
- Location within Jordan
- 31°25′15.5″N 35°57′00.8″E
- Type: desert fortress
- Periods: Iron Age II; Late Hellenistic and early Roman periods
- Cultures: Moabite, Judaism (Second Temple), Nabataean
- Associated with: Moabites, Jews, Nabateans
- Location: Amman Governorate, Jordan
- Region: Dhiban Plateau
- Part of: Moab, Hasmonean Judea, Nabataean kingdom

History
- Built: 1st century BC
- Abandoned: 1st century AD

Site notes
- Condition: In ruins

Khirbet Mudayna as-Saliya is an archaeological site consisting of the remains of an ancient desert fortress situated on an isolated promontory in central Jordan. Archaeological surveys indicate activity during the Iron Age and classical periods, with its peak occupation occurring in the late Hellenistic to early Roman era.

The ruins exhibit architectural and hydrological features comparable to those of the fortress at Machaerus; their characteristics, including the type of the cisterns and the presence of a mikveh (Jewish ritual bath), suggest that the site was originally constructed by the Hasmonean Kingdom of Judea, with later reoccupation by the Nabataeans.

== Geography ==
The fortress stands on an isolated rise where Wadi Saliya meets Wadi Saida, at the eastern headwaters of Wadi Mujib. It occupies a naturally defensible spur roughly 25 km southeast of Dhiban and about 60 km south of Jordan's capital, Amman. The summit is bordered by steep slopes on nearly all sides, with only a narrow approach preserved on the east. The upper surface measures approximately 50 m north–south by 150 m east–west.

The name "Khirbet Mudayna" is applied to several sites in the region and means "small city" in Arabic. According to archaeologist Chaim Ben David, however, the name may actually preserve the biblical toponym "Midian," which Late Roman and Byzantine sources place in Moab near the Arnon River (modern Wadi Mujib).

== Research history ==
The site was visited by several scholars throughout history. In the early 20th century, it was visited by Alois Musil in 1900 and 1901, and Félix-Marie Abel (1938). Abel identified the site as "the city in the middle of the valley" mentioned in the Hebrew Bible (Num 22:36, Deu 2:36, Josh 13:9). Nelson Glueck surveyed the site in June 1933 and described it as a large isolated Nabatean site surrounded by a strong wall with towers, assigning most of the collected pottery sherds to the Nabatean and early Roman periods. The first systematic survey of Mudayna as-Saliya was conducted in 1996 by the Dhiban Plateau Survey Project team, headed by Chang-Ho C. Ji and Jong-Keun Lee. This visit documented the remains of walls, buildings and cisterns. Another session took place in 1997.

== Archaeology ==
The layout of the site and the design of its structures bear a strong similarity to those at Machaerus, especially the components dating to the Hasmonean era. On the southern side, two fortification lines (each more than a meter thick and surviving to about a meter in height) indicate that the settlement underwent at least two separate phases of defensive construction. The earlier wall may belong to the Iron II period, whereas the later system appears to have been built in the late Hellenistic era during the 1st century BCE and continued to be used into the early Roman period.

Architectural traces are spread unevenly across the top of the hill. Several substantial buildings once occupied the northern part of the summit, while the central and southeastern areas show comparatively few remains, suggesting functions other than dense habitation, possibly open surfaces used for rainwater harvesting. Many surviving wall segments align with the natural contours of the promontory. At the summit of the site is a stone pile, which may represent the remnants of an elevated platform or a masonry structure.

The site incorporates both exposed and subterranean installations for managing water. At the summit is a ruined open reservoir; another, much larger, lies on a terrace partway down the northern slope and was originally partitioned internally. An aqueduct from the adjacent hills was once directed along a built channel that crossed the eastern saddle before feeding a series of rock-cut cisterns on the promontory’s flanks. Surveyed cisterns vary considerably in size but generally fall between roughly 50 and 200 square meters. On the north-western side, a stepped installation with plastered surfaces has been interpreted as a mikveh (Jewish ritual bath). Seven steps descend into a small chamber. Features of the structure resemble purification installations known from sites associated with the Hasmonean and Herodian periods, including the nearby palace-fort of Machaerus.

== Historical interpretation ==
The first significant occupation at the site dates to Iron Age II. Ceramic findings, including Moabite globular cooking pots, suggest the earlier fortification might be attributable to the Moabites, who controlled the area during the 9th to 7th centuries BC.

Archaeological indicators point to a Late Hellenistic foundation of the fortress, and the combination of features at the site—its placement on a high, defensible promontory, the scale of its fortification system, the sophisticated arrangements for capturing and storing water, and the inclusion of a stepped immersion installation—aligns well with what is known from other strongholds built under Hasmonean rule. On this basis, Ji suggested that the fort may have been created during the reign of Hasmonean king Alexander Jannaeus, sometime after his construction of nearby Machaerus around 90 BC and before his death in 76 BC.

The site's strategic value under the Hasmoneans appears to have been primarily military. Situated near the desert track running along the eastern side of Wadi Mujib, the position would have allowed oversight of movement between the southern regions of Transjordan and the uplands to the north and west. Control of this corridor would also have complemented Hasmonean efforts to restrict Nabataean trade and mobility following their acquisitions of Gaza and sections of the King's Highway. If this reconstruction is correct, the site might reflect a period when the frontier between the Hasmonean and Nabataean realms was shifting, and when Hasmonean expansion may have reached farther east than generally assumed.

The final phase of Hasmonean activity at the site likely came to an end in the late 50s BC, around the time when Roman commander Aulus Gabinius dismantled Machaerus during his campaign against the last Hasmonean forces. The ceramic record at Mudayna as-Saliya contains no examples of Nabataean Phase II painted ware (typically dated to the second half of the 1st century BC), which implies that little or no occupation followed immediately after the Hasmonean withdrawal. Nabataean presence is only evident in the Early Roman period, when material from the 1st century AD becomes more common on the surface.

== See also ==
- Alexandrium
- Hyrcania
- Masada
- Machaerus
- Qeren Naftali

== Bibliography ==
- Abel, Félix-Marie (1938). Géographie de la Palestine II: Géographie politique, les villes. Paris: Gabalda.
- Ben David, Chaim (2017). "The Mudayna sites of the Arnon tributaries: "Midian alongside Moab"?" (PDF). Antiguo Oriente. 15: 149–174.
- Glueck, Nelson (1934). Exploration of Eastern Palestine I. Philadelphia: American Schools of Oriental Research.
- Ji, Chih-Chieh; Lee, Jong (1998). "Preliminary Report on the Survey of the Dhiban Plateau, 1997". Annual of the Department of Antiquities of Jordan. 42: 549–571.
- Ji, Chang-Ho (2020). "A Late Hellenistic–Early Roman Fortress at Khirbat Mudayna as-Saliya, Central Jordan". Palestine Exploration Quarterly. 152 (3): 207–233. doi:10.1080/00310328.2020.1759297.
- Musil, Alois (1907–1908). Arabia Petraea, Volume 1. Vienna: Kaiserliche Akademie der Wissenschaften; Holder.
