= Horvat 'Eqed =

Ruins of a fortified settlement in ancient Judea

Khirbet el-ʻAqd
- خربه العقد (Arabic)
- Horvat ʻEqed
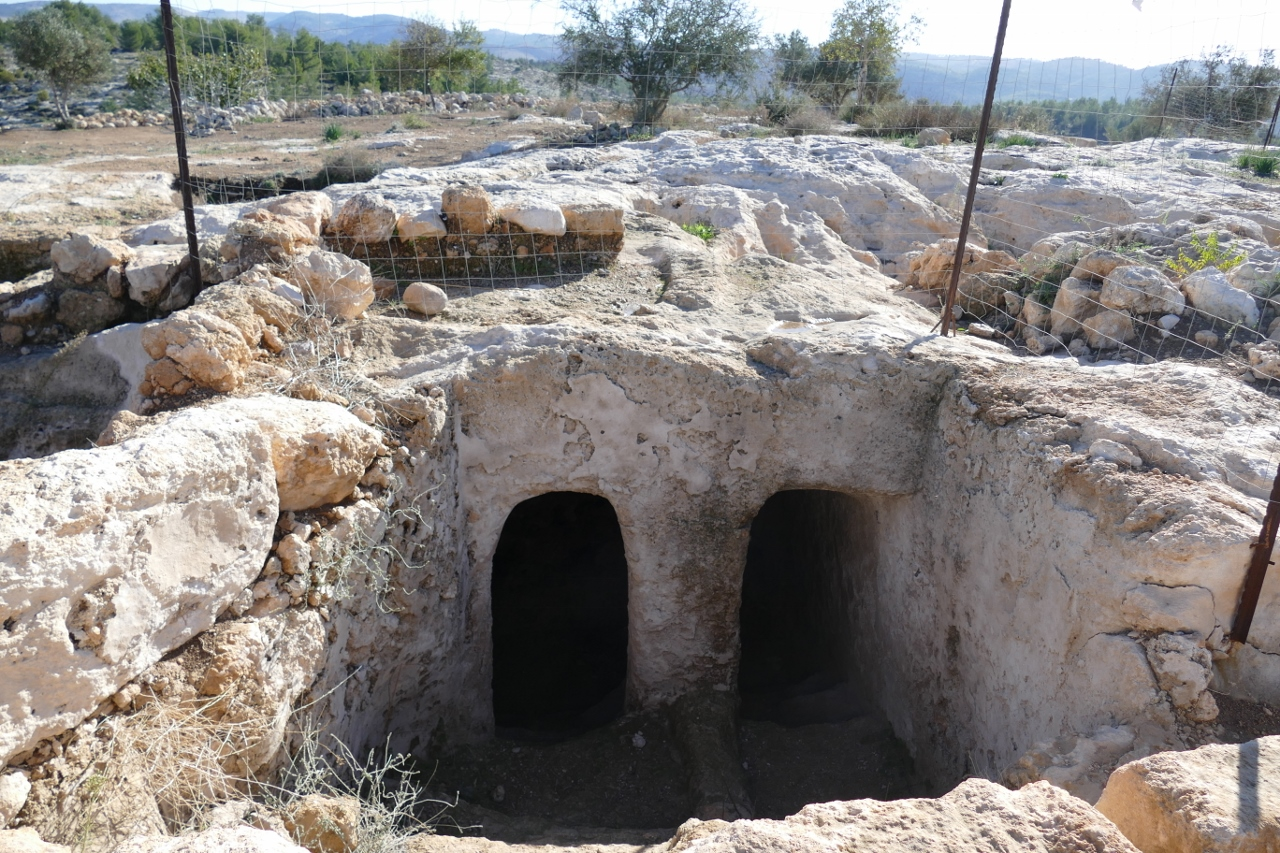
- Jewish ritual bath in Khirbet el-ʻAqd

- Location within the West Bank
- 31°50′12″N 35°00′30″E
- Type: Fortified settlement
- Periods: Hellenistic and Roman
- Cultures: Hellenistic culture, Second Temple Judaism
- Associated with: Jews
- Location: Canada Park
- Region: Shephelah
- Palestine grid: 150/138

History
- Event(s): Maccabean revolt Bar Kokhba revolt

Site notes
- Height: 365 m (1,198 ft)
- Excavation dates: 1976, 1978–1980, 1983, 2012
- Condition: In ruins
- Public access: Yes

Khirbet el-ʻAqd (Arabic: خربه العقد) or Horvat ʻEqed (Hebrew: חורבת עקד) is an archaeological site in the Latrun salient of the West Bank, (Note: The international community considers the area to be part of the West Bank, while Israel considers it part of its own territory and currently occupies it.) approximately 22 km northwest of Jerusalem. The site, situated on a hill, contains the ruins of an ancient fortified town dating from the Hellenistic period through the Bar Kokhba Revolt (130s CE), after which the site was ultimately abandoned.

The site has yielded significant finds, including robust fortifications constructed during the Hellenistic period, possibly by the Seleucid general Bacchides. These defenses were subsequently strengthened during the Bar Kokhba Revolt, suggesting the site's potential role as a major rebel stronghold during that period. Further discoveries from this revolt include hiding complexes and coins used by the Jewish rebel state. Notable among the findings are Jewish ritual baths, as well as remnants of weaponry such as armor scales, slingshots, ballistae and arrowheads.

Khirbet el-ʻAqd is believed to be the site of the Hellenistic and early Roman-period town of Emmaus, with the name later shifting to a newer, larger city situated on the slopes, 2 km away from the original location.

== Geography ==
Khirbet el-ʻAqd is located in the Latrun salient, approximately 2 km southeast of the ruins of Emmaus Nicopolis—modern Imwas, razed in 1967—and 22 km northwest of Jerusalem, within the Canada Ayalon Park. It is situated atop a steep hill 365 m high, providing vantage points over its surroundings, including the northern Ayalon Valley, the Shephelah, the hills of Benjamin and the Jerusalem Mountains. Its location, at the crossroads between Jerusalem and the coastal plain, coupled with nearby water sources, made it a site of strategic significance in ancient times.

== Surveys and excavations ==
The archaeological site was initially surveyed in 1873 by C. R. Conder and H. H. Kitchener from the Palestine Exploration Fund, who recorded the presence of "[f]oundations of houses, traces of ruins, and caves".

Further explorations were undertaken by the Mandatory Department of Antiquities, and the site was surveyed again in 1972 by the Israel Archaeological Survey.

In the mid-1970s, unauthorized digs at the site prompted salvage excavations led by E. Damati. These efforts concentrated on a hiding complex located in the western section of the site.

From 1978 to 1980, and again in 1983, the site was excavated under the direction of M. Gichon and Mi. Fischer from Tel Aviv University. These excavations revealed a 30-meter section of a wall at the southwestern summit of the hill, constructed with roughly hewn stones and fillers. The wall's thickness was approximately 2.5 meters, and it was preserved up to 3 meters high. In 1980, the excavations focused on uncovering semi-circular towers flanking the southern gate of the site. These towers were based on natural rock and filler, and evidence suggested they were destroyed during the First Jewish–Roman War and reconstructed in the Bar Kokhba Revolt.

In 2011, B. Har-Even and E. Aharonovich from the Staff Office of Archaeology conducted a survey as part of a comprehensive plan focusing on the development, preservation, and conservation of key archaeological sites within Canada Ayalon Park.

In 2012, further archaeological investigations were conducted at the site by H. Hizmi, M. Haber, and E. Aharonovich. The work during this period was concentrated on the southeastern section, revealing portions of the southern and eastern walls that featured six towers spanning approximately 170 meters in total. The primary goals of this excavation phase were to better understand the site's fortifications across different historical periods. Special discoveries from this excavation include stamped Rhodian handles and yh-ligatured stamp impressions dating back to the 2nd century BCE, numerous marble fragments in three different colors, hypocaust bricks from a bathhouse, and fragments of ornate kalal vessels.

== History ==
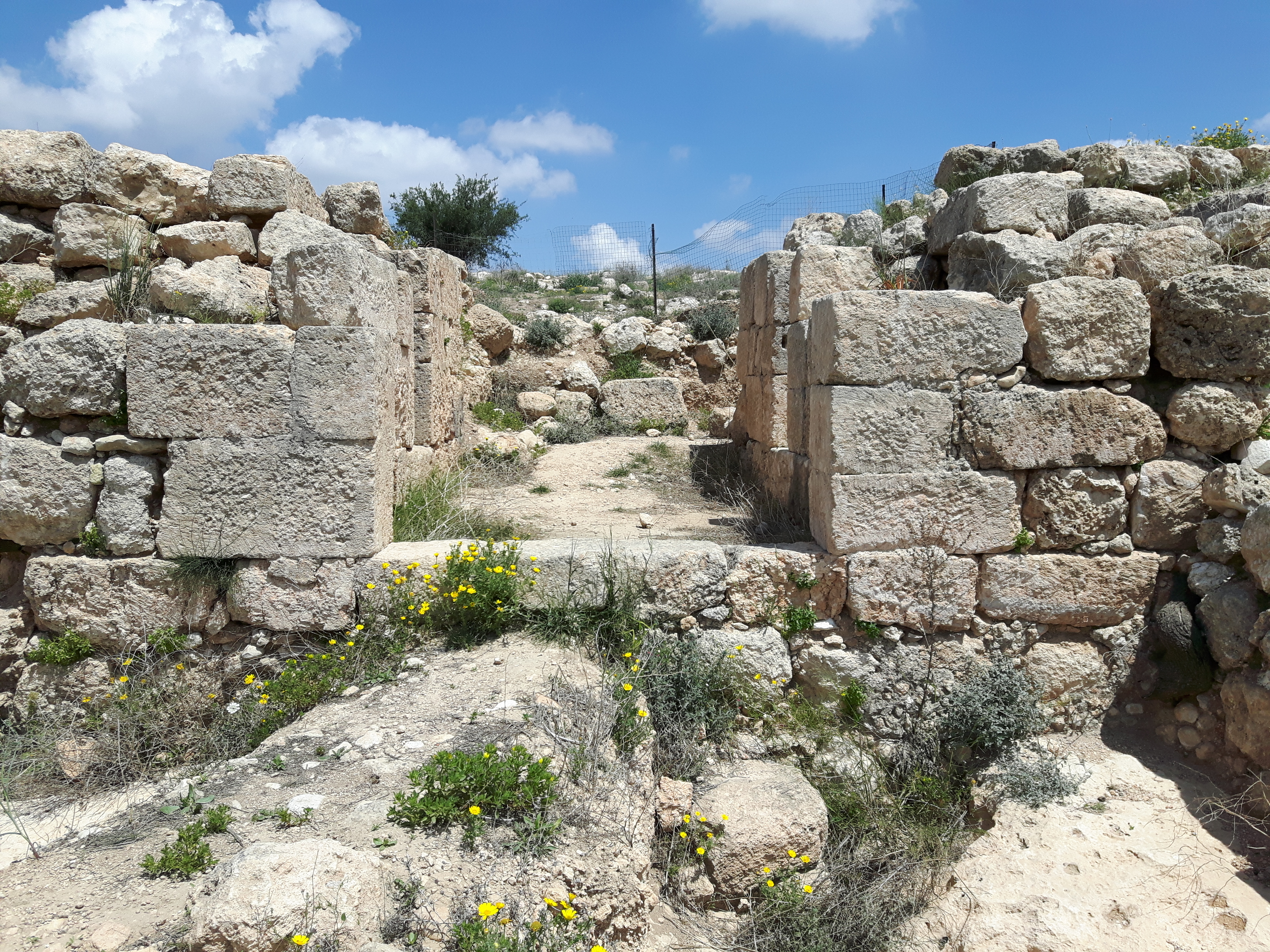
Doorway at the site

Gichon and Fischer propose that the site corresponds to the Hellenistic-period Emmaus, which, according to the Book of Maccabees and the historian Josephus, was one of several locations fortified by the Seleucid general Bacchides around 160 BCE. This fortification formed part of a broader campaign to suppress the Maccabean Revolt by controlling critical passes leading to the Judaean Mountains and ultimately to Jerusalem. This identification has also been accepted by archaeologists Hizmi, Haber, and Aharonovich, who note its proximity to the site of Emmaus known from Roman and Byzantine times. They add that impressive remains dating from the second century BCE were found exclusively at the former site and not at the latter, lending further support to this identification.

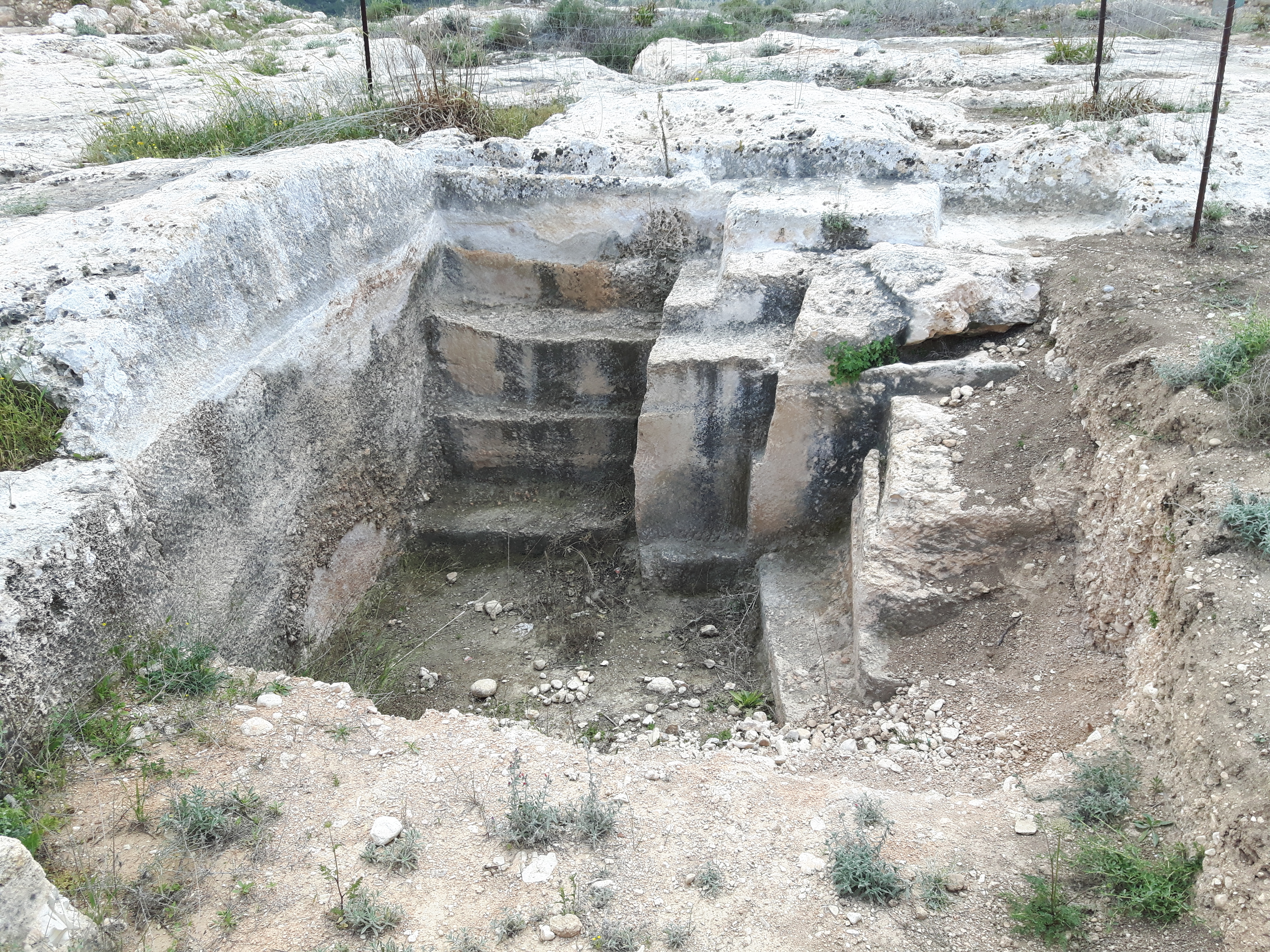
Ancient quarry

Findings from the early Roman period imply that inhabitants at the site sought and relished a degree of comfort and luxury. However, it remains unknown whether these were local civilians who resettled the area, newcomers who established roots there, or Hasmonean soldiers who continued to occupy the fortress following the defeat of the Seleucids.

Khirbet el-ʻAqd exhibits a well-documented presence of Jewish rebels during the Bar Kokhba Revolt, as evidenced by hiding complexes as well as artifacts such as arrowheads, pottery, and coinage typical of the period. The Hellenistic-period fortifications were reinforced during the revolt. The majority of arrowheads unearthed at the site are believed to originate from the period of the revolt. Drawing on evidence of hiding complexes and imposing fortifications, archaeologists Hizmi, Haber, and Aharonovich argue that the site was more than a mere refuge. They posit that it was a major stronghold during the revolt, possibly serving as a secure and strategic base from which attacks were launched and daily activities under siege were coordinated.

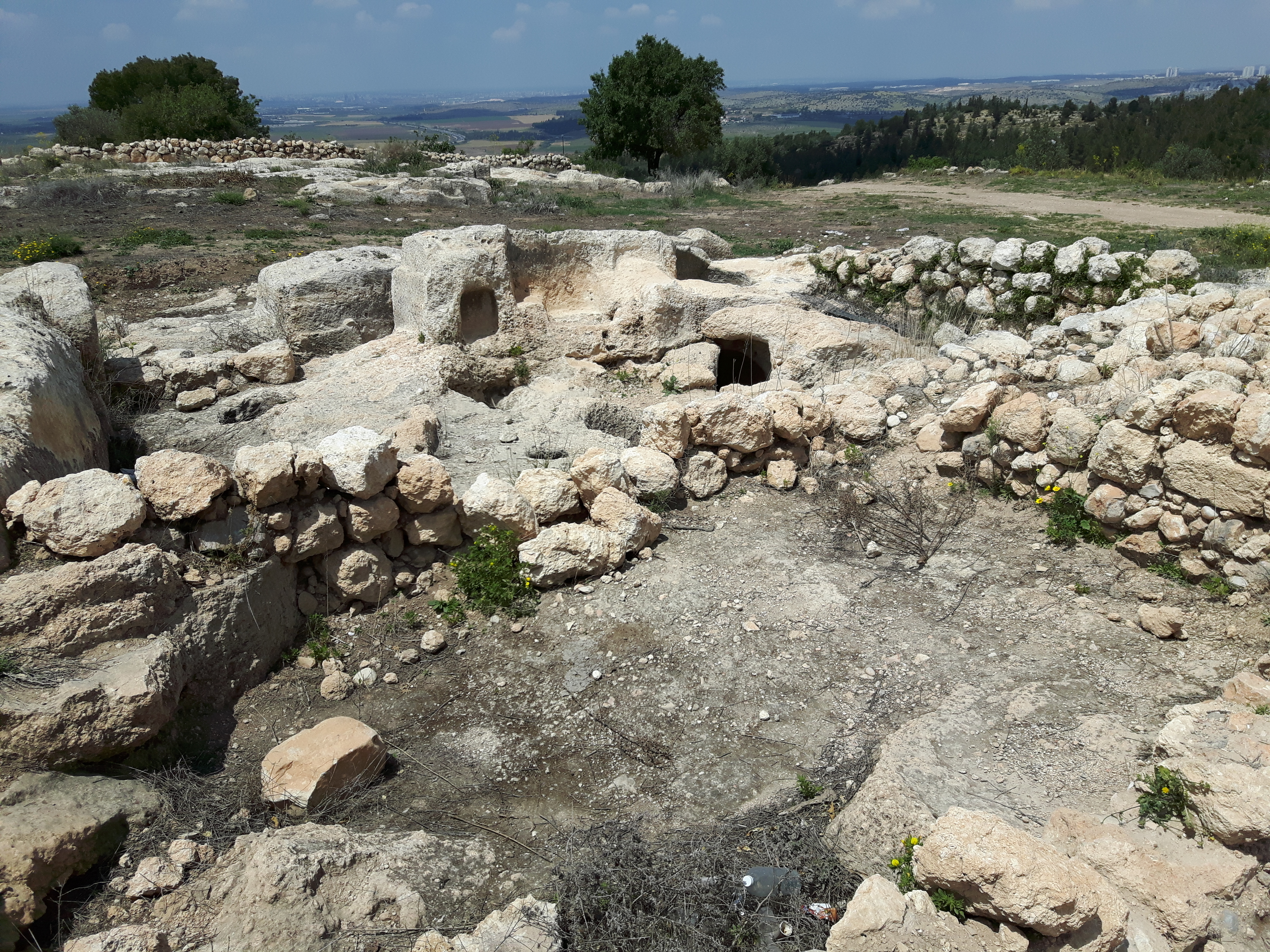
Remains of rock-cut structures

The site was ultimately abandoned after the revolt, and the name Emmaus was transferred to a newly established town situated on the slopes 2 kilometers northwest. This "new" Emmaus may trace its origins back to the 1st century BCE, as evidenced by archaeological findings from this period found at the site. This historical relevance is supported by Josephus, who refers to Emmaus as a metropolis—a designation unlikely to apply to ʻEqed. According to Josephus, around 4 BCE, Varus burned Emmaus in retaliation for an attack on Roman soldiers by Jewish rebels nearby. Additionally, in 68 CE, the Legio V Macedonia was stationed at Emmaus, where they constructed a fortified camp to oversee the main routes leading to Jerusalem and the coast.

== See also ==
- Emmaus Nicopolis – the site of Emmaus during the later Roman and Byzantine periods
- Horvat Mazad – a nearby fortified site also connected with the Hasmoneans
