= Horvat Mazad =

Archaeological site in Israel

- חורבת מצד (Hebrew)
- Khirbet al-Qasr خربة القصر (Arabic)
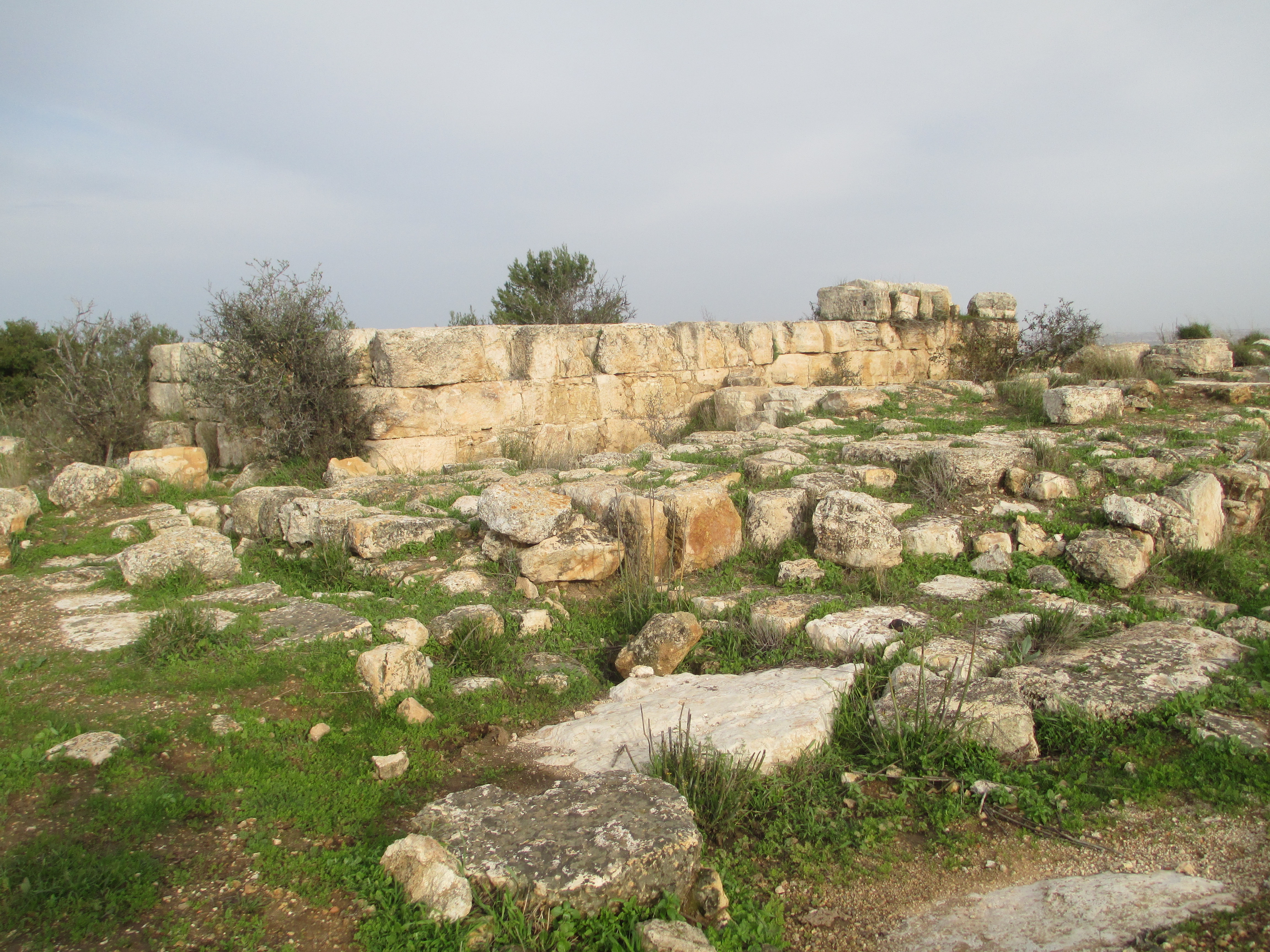

- Location within Israel
- 31°48′59.2″N 35°03′14.5″E
- Type: Fortification
- Periods: Early agricultural activity: Bronze Age, Iron Age, Yehud Medinata period; Main phase: Hasmonean and Herodian periods; Later phases: Byzantine, Early Islamic, Mamluk and Ottoman periods
- Cultures: Second Temple Judaism
- Associated with: Jews
- Location: Jerusalem District, Israel
- Region: Judaean Mountains
- Palestine grid: 155/135

Site notes
- Height: 530 m (1,740 ft)
- Excavation dates: 1977, 1978, 1980, 1984, 1998
- Archaeologists: Moshe Fischer
- Condition: In ruins
- Public access: Yes

Horvat Mazad (also spelled Hurvat Mesad, Hebrew: חורבת מצד) or Khirbet el-Qasr (also Khirbet al-Kusr, Arabic: خربة القصر) is an archaeological site located in the Jerusalem District of Israel. Occupied intermittently from the Late Bronze Age to the modern period, its main phase occurred between the 2nd century BCE and the 1st century CE, when it was developed into a fortified complex by the Hasmonean and Herodian dynasties before being abandoned during the First Jewish–Roman War (66–73 CE).

Horvat Mazad, located along the ancient Jaffa–Jerusalem road, served as a strategic outpost overseeing access between the coastal plain and the Judaean Mountains. Archaeological remains include a square watchtower, casemate walls, cisterns, vaults, and a rock-cut mikveh (Jewish ritual bath) that was later altered by burials dating to the Early Islamic period. Researchers believe the site was part of a broader defensive network protecting routes into Jerusalem. Excavations have uncovered artifacts from multiple periods, including a substantial number of coins minted during the reign of Alexander Jannaeus, as well as oil lamps, jewelry, and textile fragments.

== Location ==
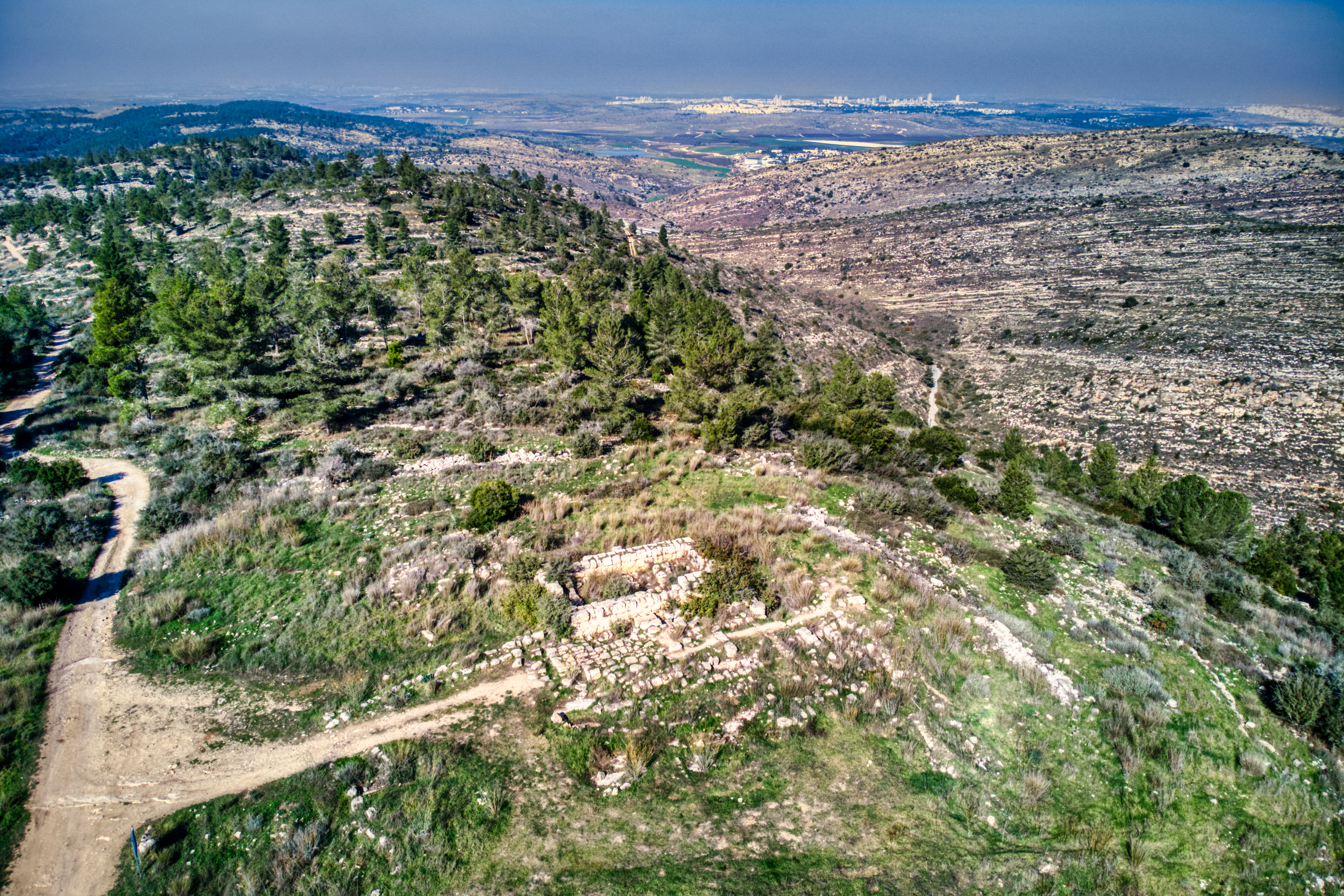
Westward view from Horvat Mazad (foreground) toward the coastal plain

Horvat Mazad lies on a hilltop about 530 meters above sea level, approximately 16 kilometers west of Jerusalem and around 3 kilometers west of Neve Ilan. It is bordered by steep slopes on the west, north, and east, while to the south, the terrain descends more gradually toward the riverbed below. In antiquity, the site was situated within the territory of Judea proper, along the ancient route connecting Jaffa and Jerusalem.

The original name of the site is unknown, and it may have referred descriptively to its role and elevated position. In modern times, the site was recorded in the 19th century under the Arabic name Khirbet al-Qasr, meaning "ruins of the fort." The modern Hebrew name, Horvat Mazad, carries the same meaning and is derived from the Arabic.

== Description ==
=== Early habitation ===
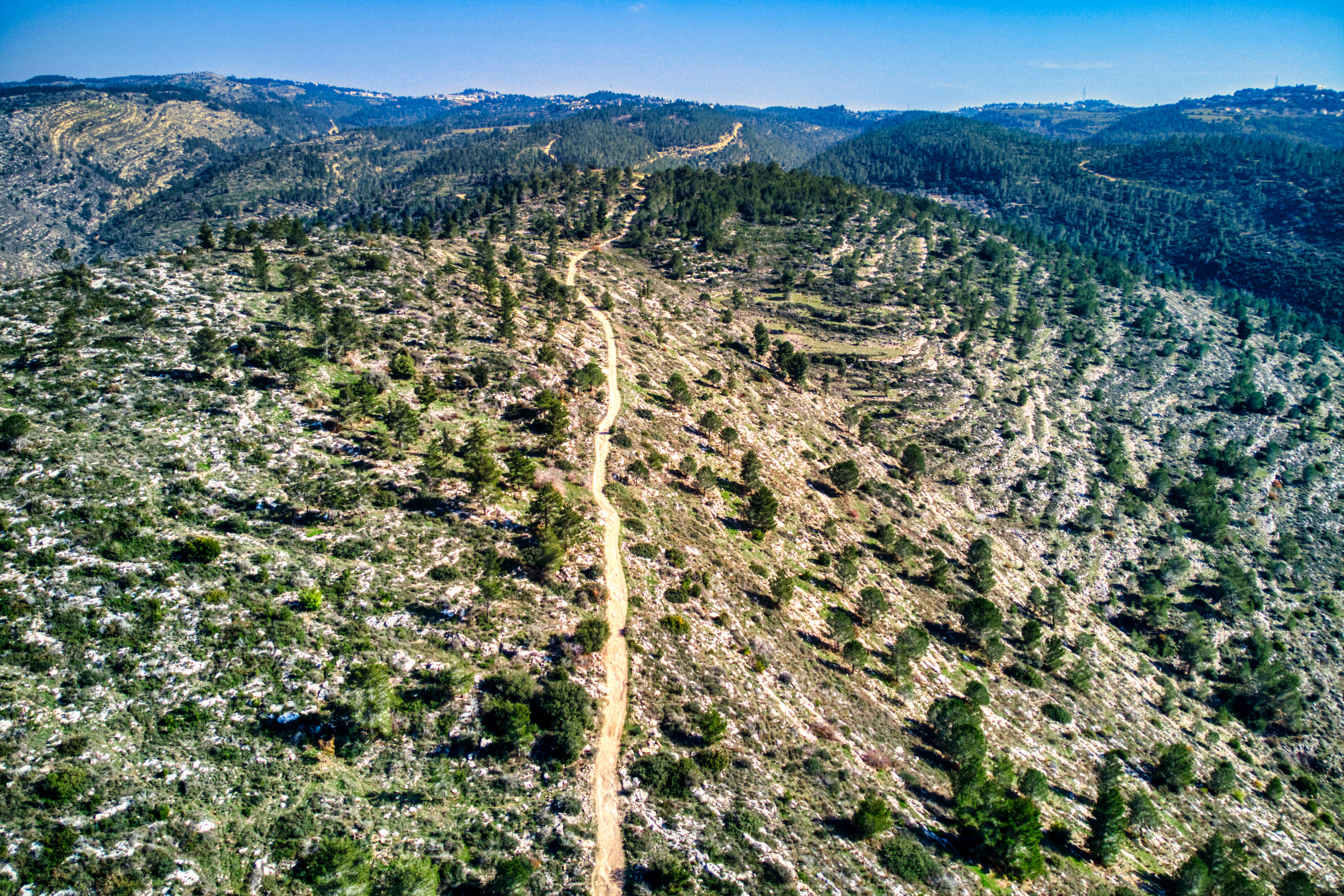
Aerial view of the surrounding area: the site appears on the hilltop near the center, to the left of the road. North is to the left.

The earliest evidence of activity at Horvat Mazad dates to the Late Bronze Age, Iron Age II, and Persian period. These remains, which were uncovered mainly in fissures and pits in the bedrock, are not associated with any architectural structures and are therefore believed to reflect agricultural activity. Finds from these periods include pottery sherds, a votive juglet, and ceramics. Notable items from the Iron Age include a Judean stone weight and a scarab, both dated to the 8th–7th centuries BCE. Artifacts from the Persian period include a mortarium fragment and two basalt bowls.

=== Hasmonean fort ===
The site's first major phase dates to the Hasmonean period (2nd to 1st centuries BCE), during which a square watchtower and a simple courtyard were constructed as part of a small fort. It was likely built under the rule of the Hasmonean king Alexander Jannaeus (103–76 BCE), though an earlier date cannot be ruled out.

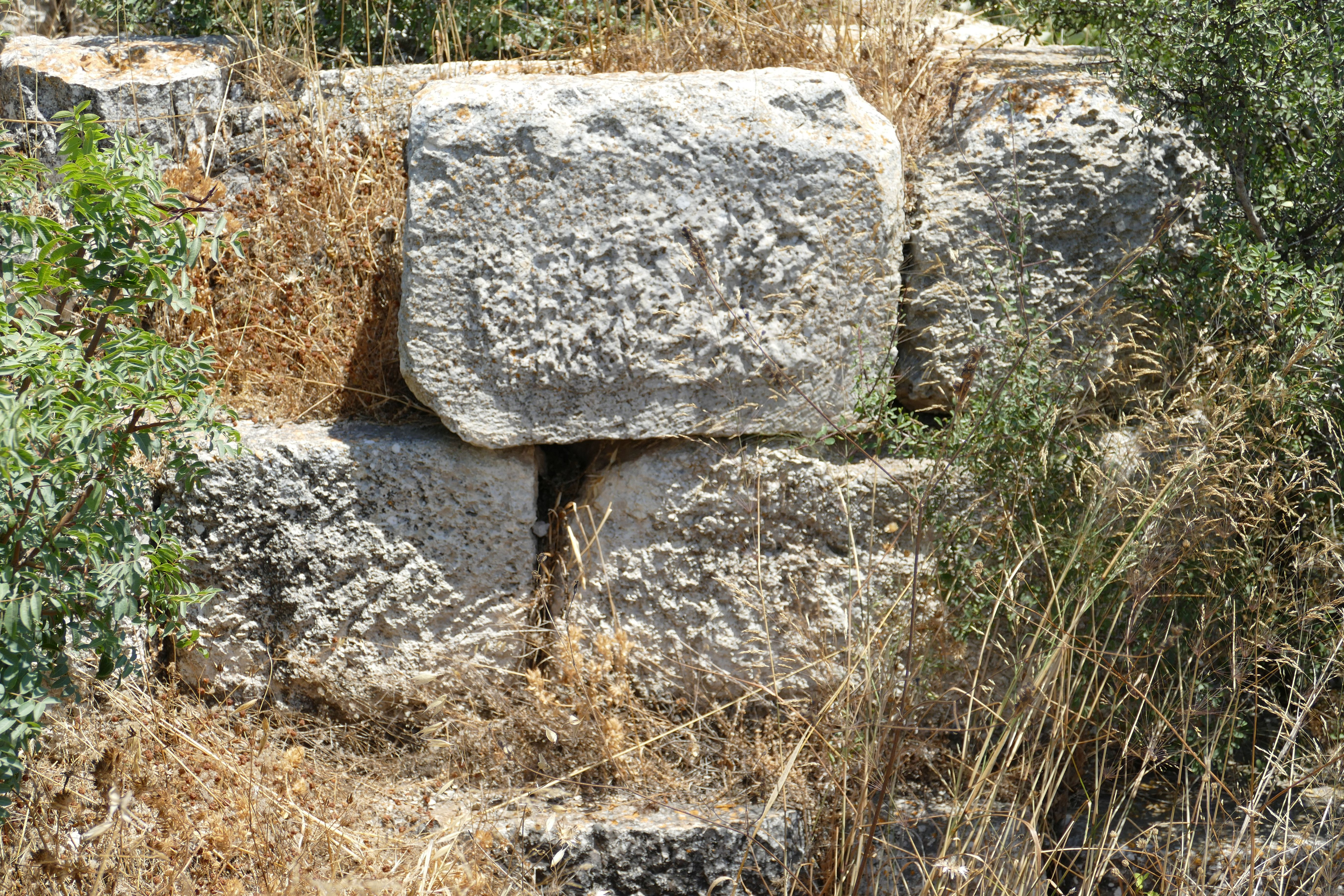
Ashlars with marginal dressings

The remains from this phase consist of a rectangular fortified complex covering approximately 200 square meters. The building featured four rooms arranged around a narrow corridor, possibly serving as the base of a staircase or ladder leading to a flat roof. Entry was through a forecourt on the eastern side, which included additional rooms. Architectural analysis indicates the use of dry masonry built directly onto leveled bedrock, with wall foundations composed of large, roughly cut stone blocks. Ashlars with prominent protruding bosses—typical of Hasmonean-period masonry found in Jerusalem and Alexandrium—were discovered at the site. The plan of the fort closely resembles other contemporary defensive installations.

The Hasmonean structure was originally enclosed by a defensive wall approximately 1.2 meters thick. A total of 56 coins from the Hasmonean period were recovered at the site, 51 of which were issued by Jannaeus, the largest assemblage associated with a single ruler yielded at the site.

Based on ceramic typology and numerous coins recovered in situ, the Hasmonean fort appears to have been abandoned shortly after the death of Jannaeus in 76 BCE and remained unoccupied until construction renewed around 40–37 BCE.

=== Herodian fortified complex ===
Horvat Mazad underwent significant expansion beginning during the reign of Herod the Great (37–4 BCE), developing into a larger fortified complex. The new construction encompassed approximately 1,600 square meters and was enclosed by a wall measuring about 1.3 meters in thickness. Builders incorporated the leveled foundations of the earlier Hasmonean structure into the expanded layout, integrating the original fort as the central core of the new complex.

The Herodian expansion included residential quarters and various installations, notably a rock-cut installation interpreted as a ritual bath (mikveh). A complete Herodian oil lamp was found lodged in one of the cracks in its wall, further supporting the proposed dating. This feature had seven steps leading down to its floor, though it was damaged by the construction of tombs during the Early Islamic period. The presence of such a facility suggests that the inhabitants were Jewish and observed purification practices consistent with those documented in rural areas and along pilgrimage routes to Jerusalem.

Architectural analysis reveals that the walls were constructed using large, roughly cut stones and reused ashlars with marginal dressing and protruding central bosses, characteristic of Herodian masonry. In the western section of the complex, rooms were built between the main core and the surrounding wall, forming casemate walls. These served both defensive purposes and as storage areas, a design characteristic of Iron Age Israelite fortifications that was revived during the reign of Herod.

The site is believed to have formed part of a broader fortification system guarding the route between Jerusalem and the coastal plain; an additional site associated with this system has been identified at Givat Shaul, and another may have been located at Emmaus. According to Yizhar Hirschfeld, although the site was previously interpreted as a roadside station—and may have initially served such a function—archaeological evidence suggests it more likely functioned as a fortified manor house.

Horvat Mazad appears to have been deserted during the First Jewish–Roman War, around 68/9 CE, possibly when Roman forces were assembling at nearby Emmaus ahead of their advance on Jerusalem. Three bronze coins from the Second and Third Years of the revolt were discovered at the site, attesting to its occupation during the conflict. Like many small settlements in Judea, Horvat Mazad was not rebuilt in the aftermath and remained largely uninhabited until the Byzantine period.

=== Middle Roman and Byzantine periods ===
After its abandonment during the First Jewish Revolt, Horvat Mazad remained uninhabited but showed signs of intermittent Roman military use. Artifacts from the site's abandonment layer include 1st–2nd century CE pottery, a stamped oil lamp linked to Roman supply lines, and a coin of the Legio X Fretensis issued c. 76–77 CE. These suggest the site was used as a temporary post by patrolling Roman troops. A reused milestone fragment dated to 162 CE confirms continued use of the road passing by the site.

During the Byzantine period, Horvat Mazad was rebuilt as a small fortified structure, measuring approximately 11 by 7 meters. Positioned on the summit of the hill, the fort was constructed directly atop the remains of earlier Hasmonean and Herodian buildings, utilizing their foundations and layout. A total of nine coins recovered from the site date to the Byzantine period, including examples from the reigns of Anastasius I and Justinian, which support a 6th-century date for the fort’s construction and use. The building likely functioned as a police station tasked with securing the route to Jerusalem and providing protection for Christian pilgrims.

=== Later history ===
During the Early Islamic period (7th–10th centuries CE), Horvat Mazad remained active, with modifications made to the existing Byzantine fort and surrounding areas. The fort's interior was reconfigured with new partition walls and ovens, while its floor was elevated. The surrounding area saw the addition of enclosure walls and continued use as a rest stop. A notable development south of the Roman road was the construction of a substantial building interpreted as a roadside inn, featuring a vestibule, a courtyard with two aisles, and adjacent rooms. Pottery and coins from the Umayyad period, including imitations of Byzantine types and post-reform issues, support the dating of these phases. Twenty-two tombs from the 8th–9th centuries CE were discovered at the site, oriented east–west and aligned toward Mecca; associated jewelry, coins, and textile fragments reflect burial practices consistent with those of contemporary Bedouin society.

In the Mamluk period (13th–15th centuries), the site was used intermittently as a way station, as indicated by ceramic and numismatic evidence, though no building activity is documented. During the Ottoman period (16th–20th centuries), the site functioned as a rest stop, with finds such as clay pipe fragments and coins suggesting continued but limited activity without substantial construction.

== Research history ==
=== Surveys ===
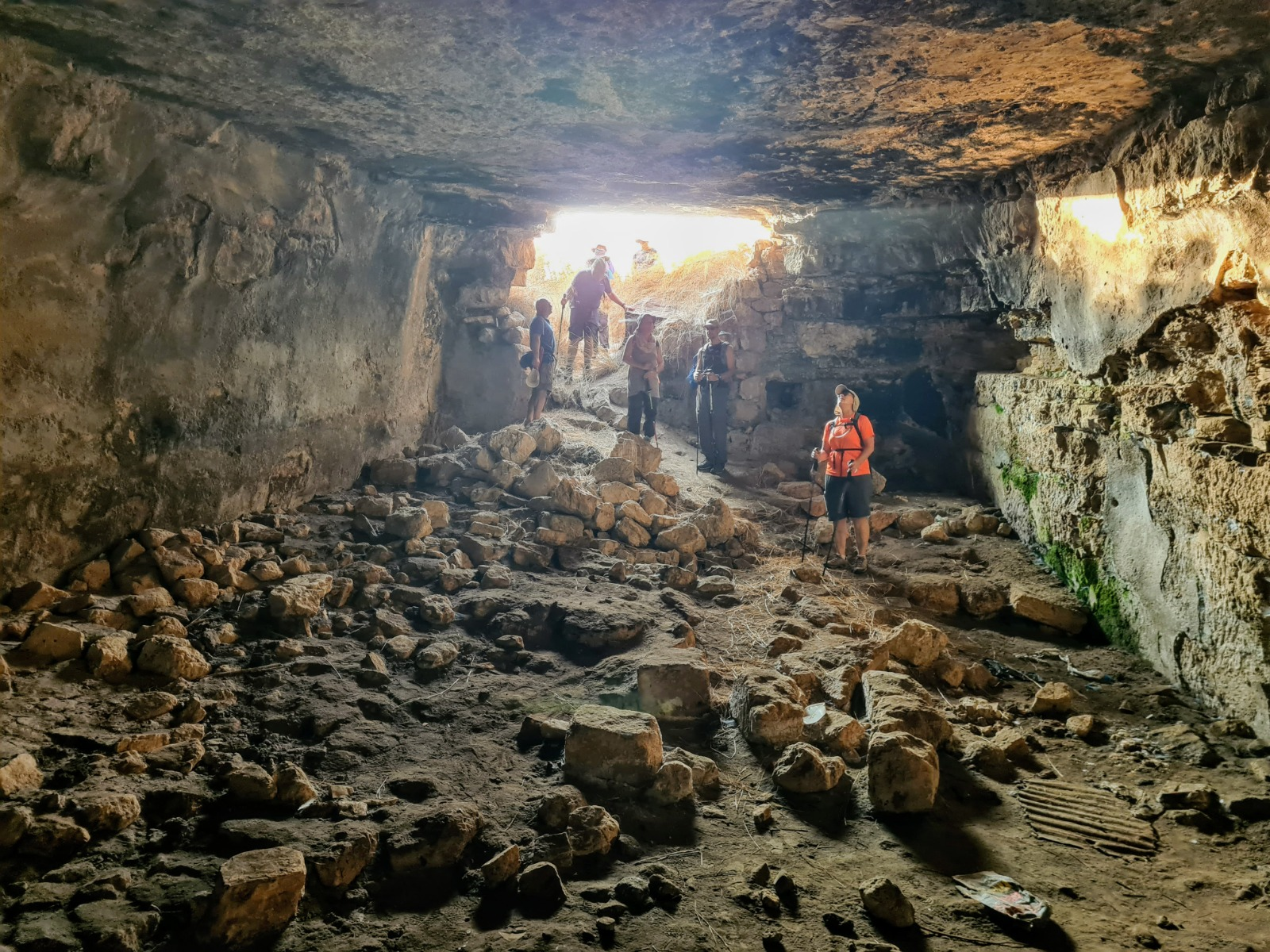
Cistern

Horvat Mazad was first noted in modern scholarship during the 19th and early 20th centuries, when several explorers and archaeologists visited the site. In the 1880s, Claude Reignier Conder and Herbert Kitchener documented "Square foundations of good-sized masonry, a rock-cut cistern, vaults and a cave," concluding that the site likely served as a station along the Roman road. Around the same period, Charles Simon Clermont-Ganneau also recorded ruins at the location.

Subsequent surveys were conducted by the German Protestant Institute of Archaeology at Jerusalem. In the 1910s and 1920s, researchers such as Mader, followed by Kuhl and Meinhold, documented architectural remains and features of the ancient road, including nearby milestones.

During the British Mandate period, Dimitri Baramki of the Mandatory Department of Antiquities inspected the site on multiple occasions. On a visit in 1942, he recorded a plan, description, and photographs, including images of a vaulted eastern wall later dated to the Byzantine period. In 1947, S.A.S Husseini noted a rectangular vault with a small doorway in the southeastern corner and observed remains of the ancient road to the east, along with Roman-era pottery fragments.

In 1972, the site was included in the Israel Milestone Committee's research program. It was visited and surveyed by Mordechai Gichon, D. Chen (who produced a detailed site plan), and Z. Roll. This plan informed the initial stages of later archaeological excavations.

=== Excavations ===
In 1977, Mordechai Gichon launched a regional archaeological program in the Emmaus–Jerusalem area, aimed at investigating the ancient roads connecting the two locations and the surrounding settlement patterns over time. As part of this program, Horvat Mazad was excavated over three main seasons—in 1977, 1978, and 1980—under the direction of Moshe Fischer, with Gichon co-directing the first two seasons. Additional surveys and soundings at the site were conducted in 1984 and 1998. The broader project received support from the Thyssen Foundation (Germany) and the Jewish National Fund (Israel), and served as a field training program for archaeology students from Tel Aviv University. Volunteers from several countries, including Brazil, Germany, the United Kingdom, Israel, Italy, Switzerland, and the United States, participated in the fieldwork. The findings from this project contributed to major studies on the Roman road system between Jaffa and Jerusalem, as well as to scholarly publications concerning Emmaus and its surrounding sites.

== See also ==
- Horvat 'Eqed – a nearby fortified site also connected with the Hasmoneans

== Bibliography ==
- Conder, Claude Reignier; Kitchener, Herbert (1883). The Survey of Western Palestine: Memoirs of the Topography, Orography, Hydrography and Archaeology. Vol. III. London: Committee of the Palestine Exploration Fund.
- Fischer, Moshe (2012). Ḥorvat Meṣad: A Way-Station on the Jaffa-Jerusalem Road. Emery and Claire Yass Publications in Archaeology, Institute of Archaeology, Tel Aviv University. ISBN 978-965-266-033-6.
- Hirschfeld, Yizhar (1998). "Early Roman manor houses in Judea and the site of Khirbet Qumran". Journal of Near Eastern Studies. 57 (3): 161–189. doi:10.1086/468637.
- Shatzman, Israel (1991). The Armies of the Hasmonaeans and Herod: From Hellenistic to Roman Frameworks. Texts and Studies in Ancient Judaism. Vol. 25. Mohr Siebeck. p. 354. doi:10.1628/978-3-16-158776-4. ISBN 978-3-16-145785-2.
