= Alexandrium =

Sartaba, an ancient Hasmonean fort

- Alexandreion, Sartaba
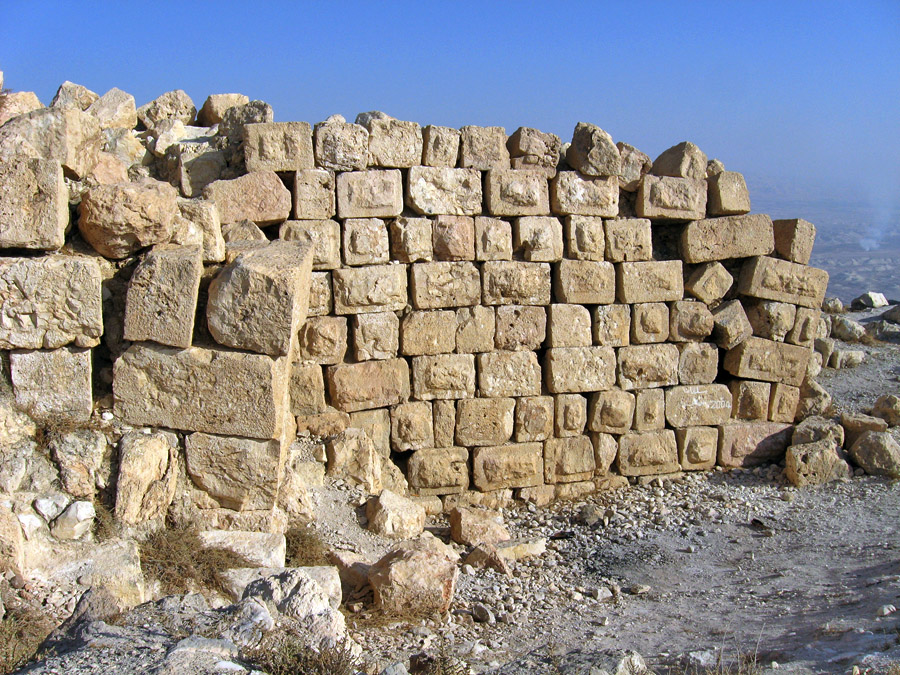
- Wall at Alexandrium

- Location within the West Bank Location within the West Bank
- 32°5′45″N 35°27′41″E
- Type: Fortification
- Periods: Hellenistic to Roman Empire
- Location: Jericho Governorate, Judea & Samaria
- Region: Judea

History
- Built: 1st century BCE
- Built by: Probably Alexander Jannaeus
- Abandoned: About 70 CE

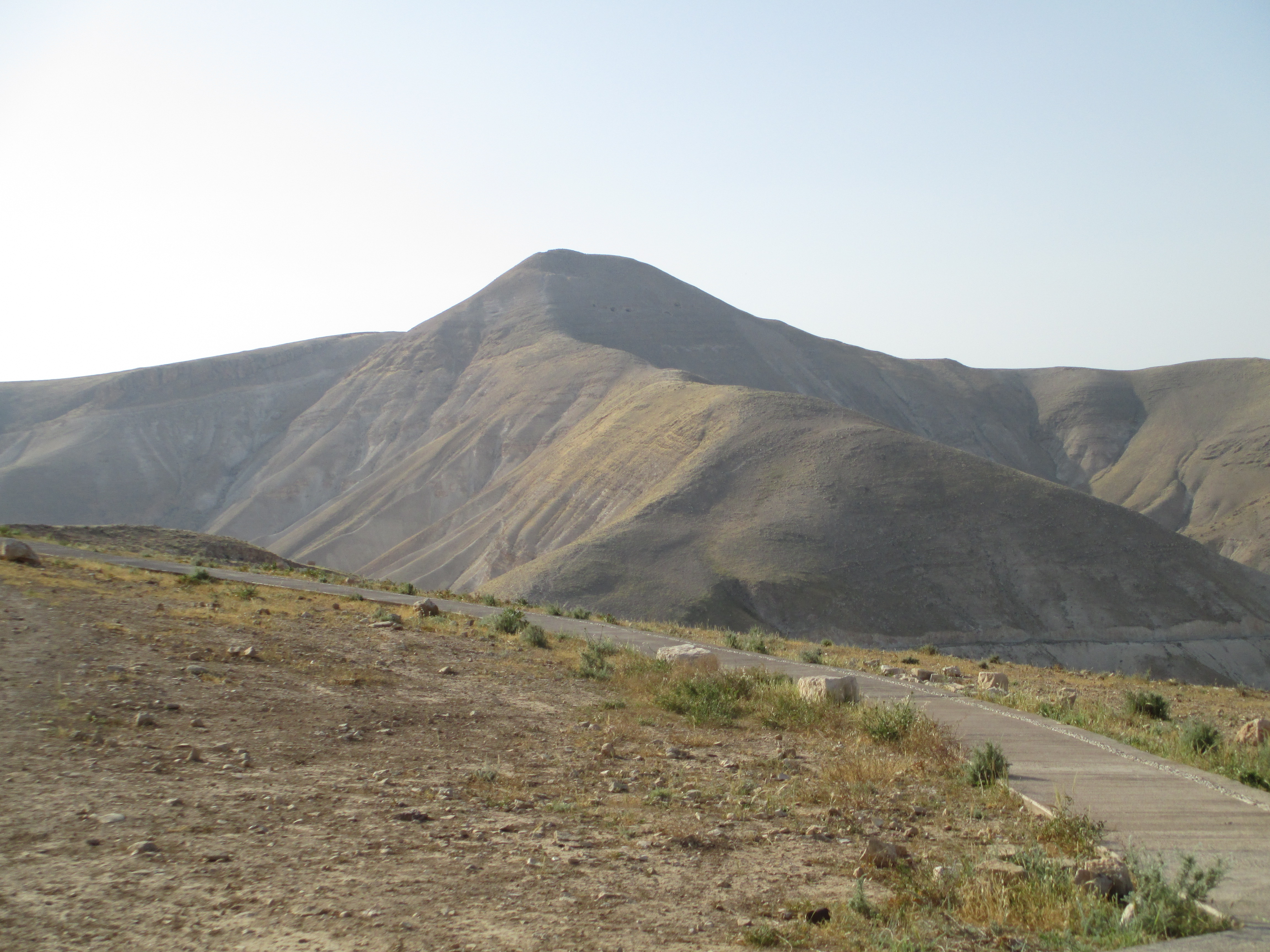
Mount Sartaba, once topped by Alexandrium fortress

Alexandreion (Greek), or Alexandrium (Latin), called Sartaba in the Mishna and Talmud and Qarn Sartaba in Arabic, was an ancient hilltop fortress constructed by the Hasmoneans between Scythopolis and Jerusalem on a pointy barren hill towering over the Jordan Valley from the west. It was likely named after Hasmonean king Alexander Jannæus (104–77 BCE).

== Name ==
The fortress called "Alexandreion" in Greek, simplified to "Alexandrion" (and Latinised as "Alexandrium"), is mentioned by Josephus in his Antiquities of the Jews. It was mentioned in the Mishna and Talmud as "Sartaba" and is now called "Qarn Sartabe" (lit. "Horn of Sartabe") in Arabic.

== History ==
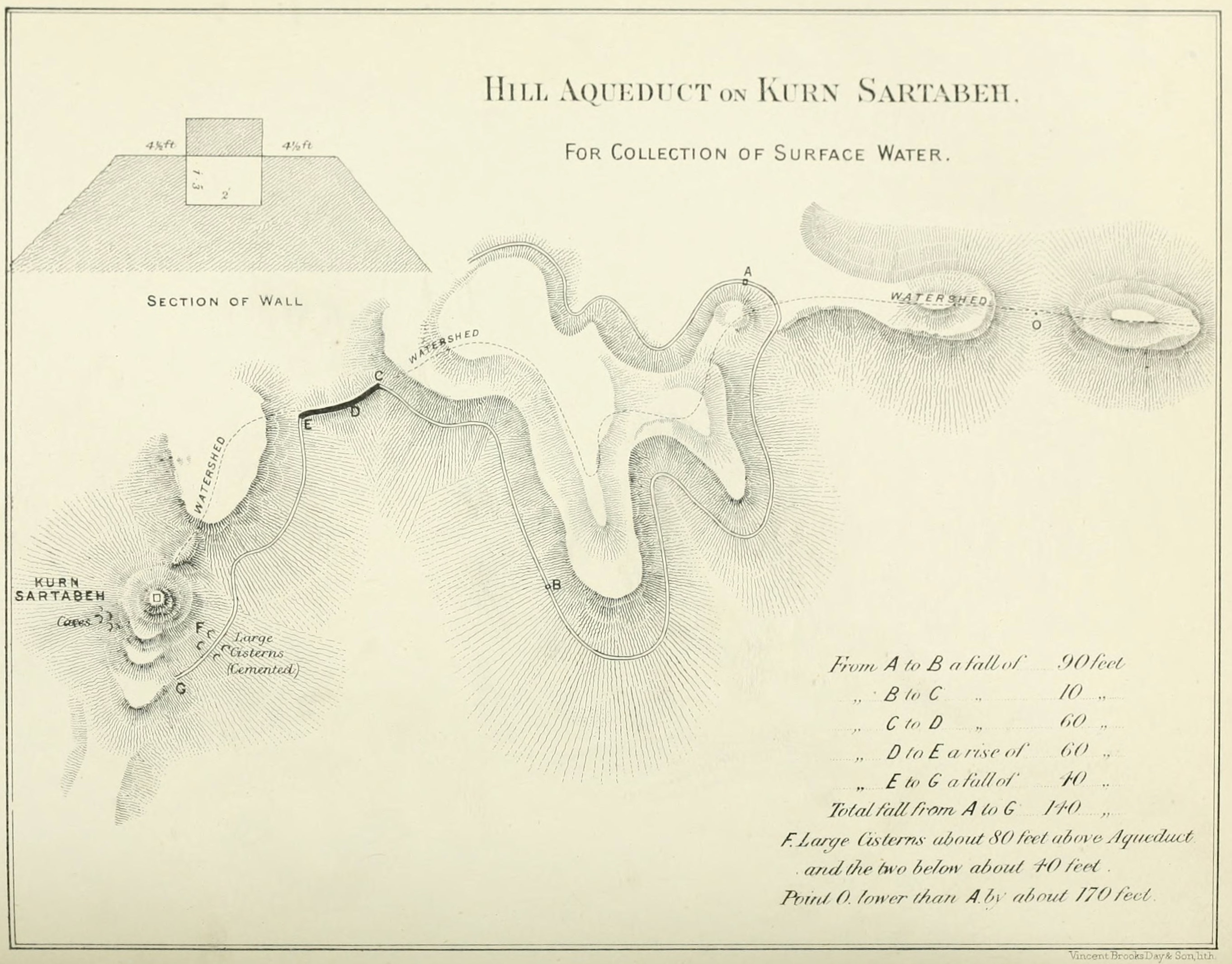
Khan Sartabeh aqueduct from the 1871-77 PEF Survey of Palestine

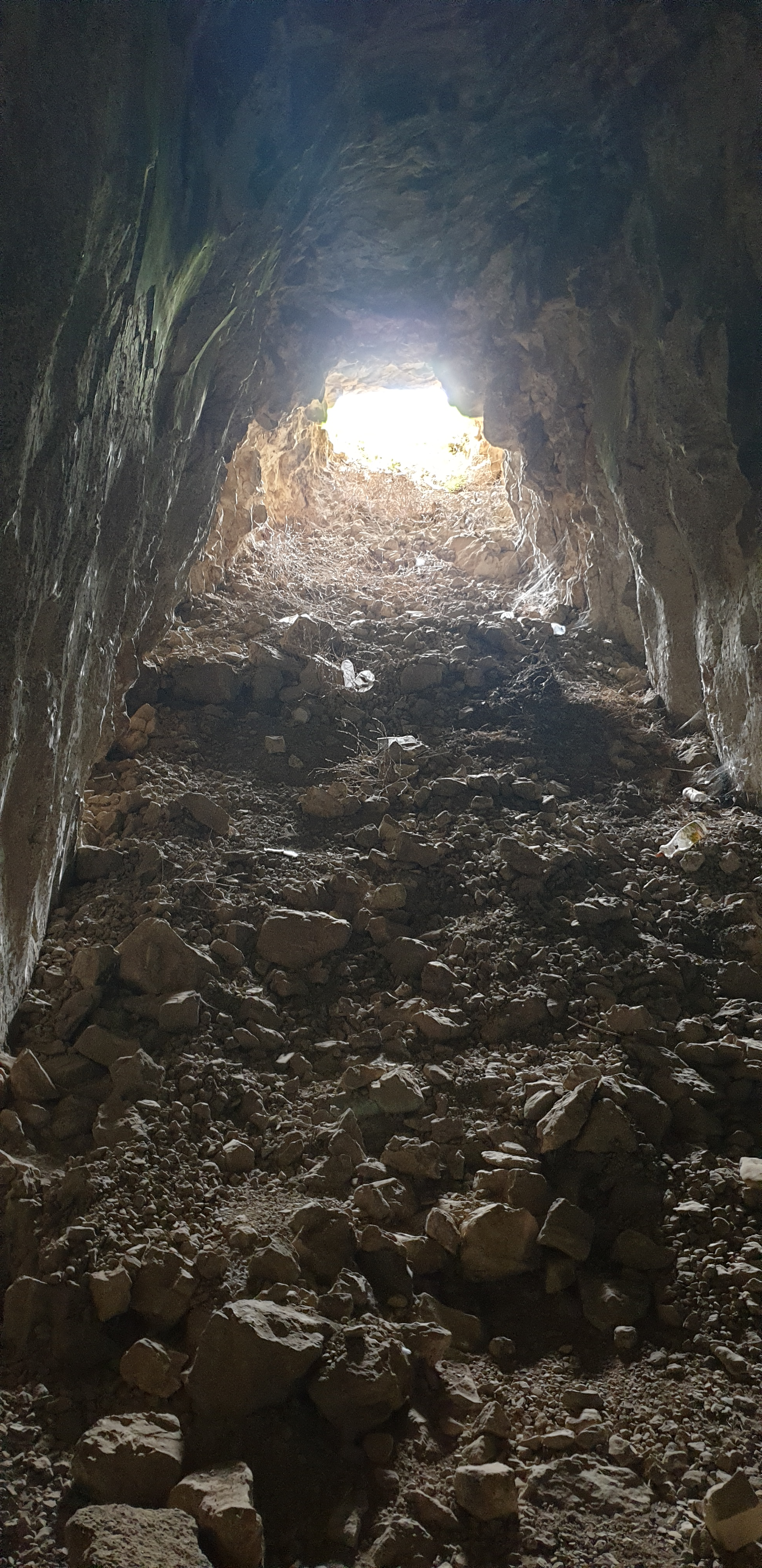
A huge rock-cut water reservoir typical of Hasmonean fortresses

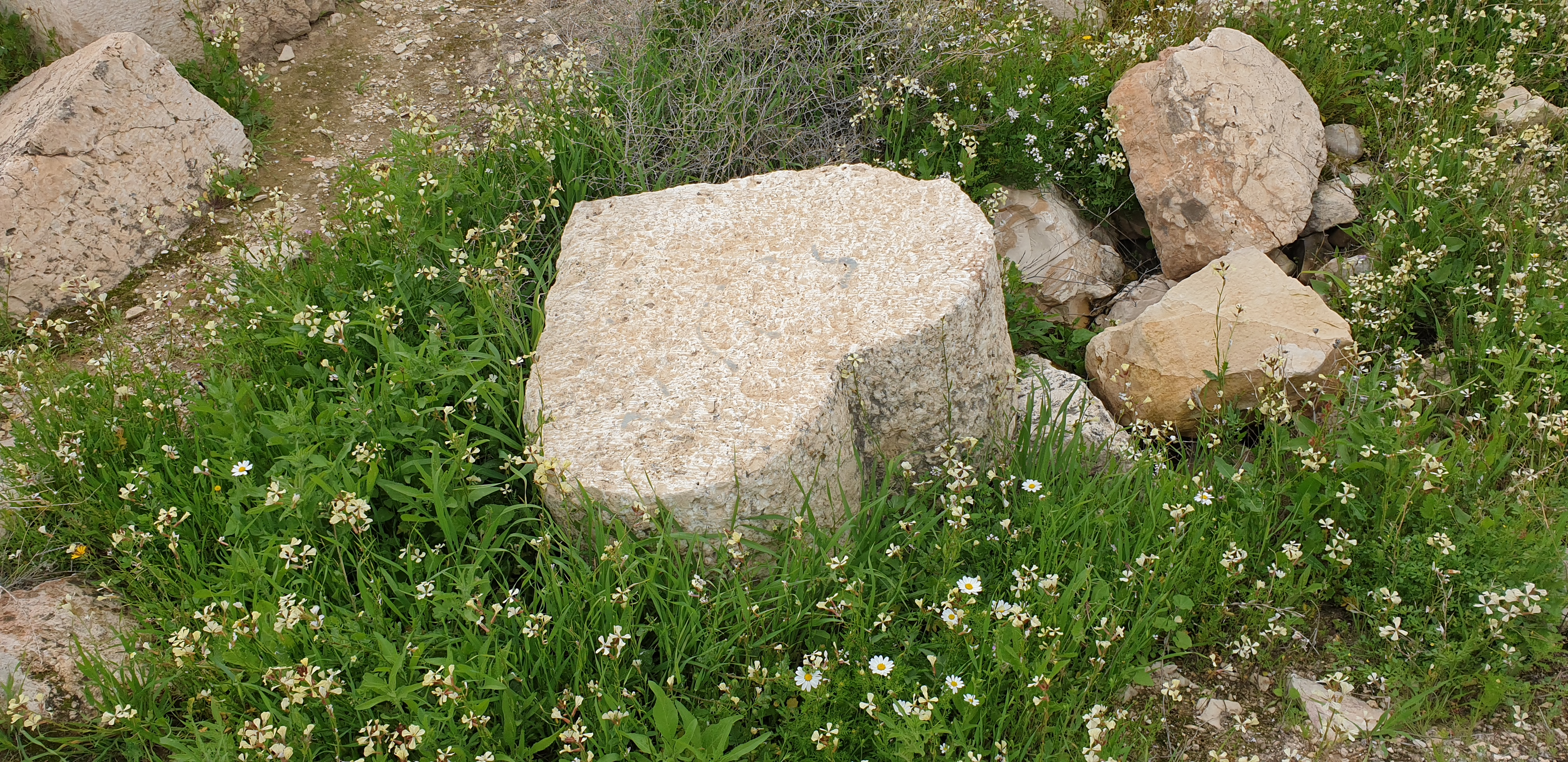
rock-cut heart shaped stone from the Hasmonean period

Alexandrium was constructed by the Hasmoneans near the border with Samaria to accommodate a military garrison, as well as to guard political prisoners. It is later mentioned during Pompey the Great's conquest of Judea as a stronghold of Aristobulus II: "...as he passed by Pella and Scythopolis, he came to Corem, which is the first entrance into Judea when one passes over the midland countries, where he came to a most beautiful fortress that was built on the top of a mountain called Alexandrium, whither Aristobulus had fled/"

The Alexandreion was restored by Herod the Great, a task he assigned to his brother Pheroras. Herod gave it the character of a palatial desert fortress, similar to those he built or rebuilt at Masada, Herodion and Machaerus. Herod used the fortress as a prison for his political opponents, holding his 2nd wife, Mariamne and her mother, Alexandra there in 30 BCE. It was also the burial site of Alexander, son of Herod, and Aristobulus, two of his sons whom Herod had executed at Sebaste in 7 BCE.

Alexandrium was finally razed by Vespasian or Titus during the Great Revolt.

== Archaeology ==
Excavations conducted in the site in the 1980s by archaeologist Yoram Tsafrir uncovered remains from the Hasmonean period, including parts of columns and capitals. In excavations conducted in 2025, led by archaeologist Dvir Raviv, five construction phases were identified on the eastern slope. The first two date to the Hasmonean period, and include a building whose walls and floor were plastered in white, a ritual bath (Mikveh), and parts of a columned structure decorated in the Doric style. In the third and fourth phases, dating to the time of Herod the Great, the Hasmonean palace was dismantled and a peristyle was built that included a columned structure paved with mosaics, the columns and walls of which were decorated with fresco and stucco, as well as a cistern and a stepped pool. The fifth and final phase included squatter walls, a tabun, and a destruction layer from the first century AD - these likely represent the activities of refugees and the Roman army during the Great Jewish Revolt.

== See also ==
- Artabba
- Mount of Temptation
- Hyrcania
- Khirbet el-'Ormeh
- Khirbet Mudayna as-Saliya
- Machaerus
