= Hyrcania (fortress) =

Hasmonean fortress in Judean Desert (2nd or 1st century BCE)

- Ὑρκανία (Ancient Greek)
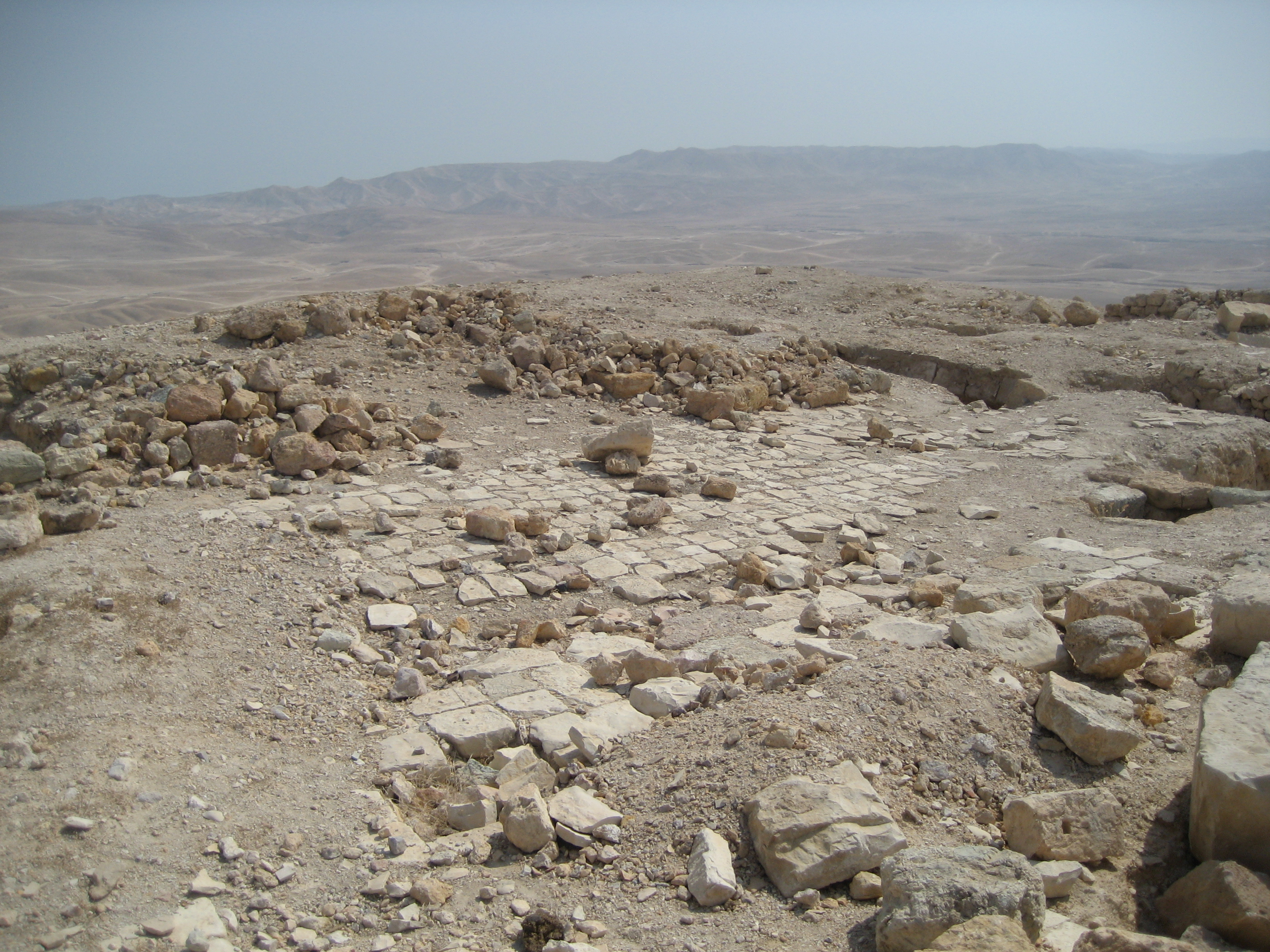
- The ruins of the fortress at the acropolis of Hyrcania

- Location within State of Palestine
- 31°43′11″N 35°21′56″E
- Type: Fortification
- Periods: Hellenistic to Late Middle Ages
- Cultures: Hellenistic-Jewish, Byzantine
- Location: Bethlehem Governorate, West Bank, Palestine
- Region: Judea

History
- Built: 2nd or 1st century BCE
- Built by: John Hyrcanus or Alexander Jannaeus
- Abandoned: 14th century CE

Site notes
- Archaeologists: Oren Gutfeld and Michal Haber (2023, HUJI)

Hyrcania (Ancient Greek: Ὑρκανία; Arabic: خربة المرد "Khirbet el-Mird"; Hebrew: הורקניה Horcania) was an ancient fortress in the Judean Desert. It was built by Hasmonean ruler John Hyrcanus or his son Alexander Jannaeus in the 2nd or 1st century BCE (in the Hellenistic part of the Second Temple period). The site is located on an isolated hill about 200 metres (660 ft) above the Hyrcania valley, on its western edge. It is in Bethlehem Governorate in Palestine, about 5 kilometres (3.1 mi) west of Qumran, and 16 kilometres (9.9 mi) east of Jerusalem.

Initially destroyed by Gabinius, the fortress was rebuilt and greatly expanded by King Herod (r. 37–4 BCE; Roman period). After Herod executed his son Antipater, he was interred there. After Herod's death Hyrcania was abandoned, only to be resettled during the Byzantine period, when a late-5th century monastery named Kastellion was established on the ruined fortress, which remained active until the early 9th century. There was a short-lived attempt by monks to rebuild in the 1920s–30s. The ancient ruins can still be seen today. Until the start of a 2023 archaeological campaign, the site had not yet been thoroughly excavated, and knowledge about the ruins of the site was based on a limited number of test pits.

== History ==
=== Hasmonean fortress ===
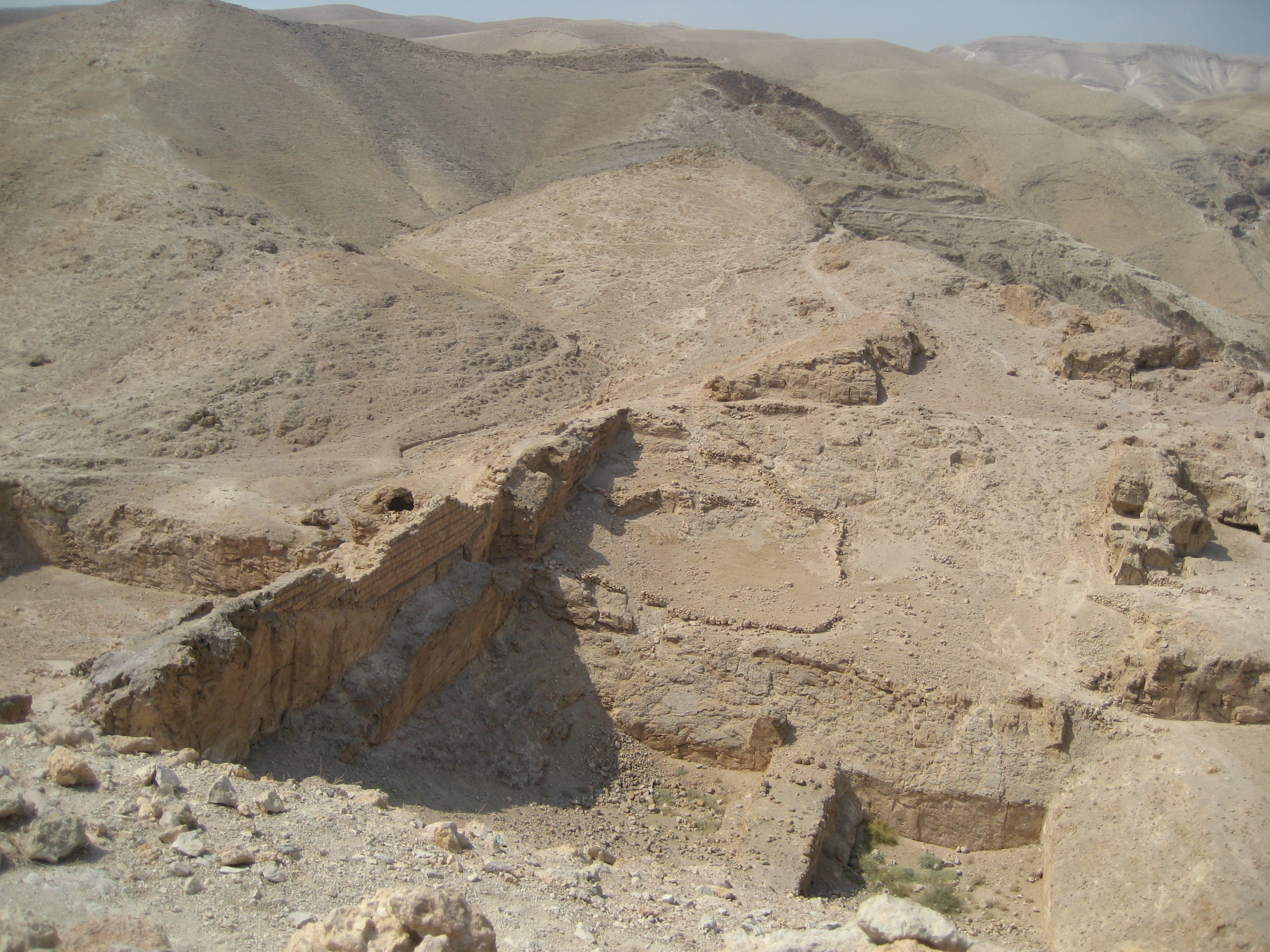
Water reservoir

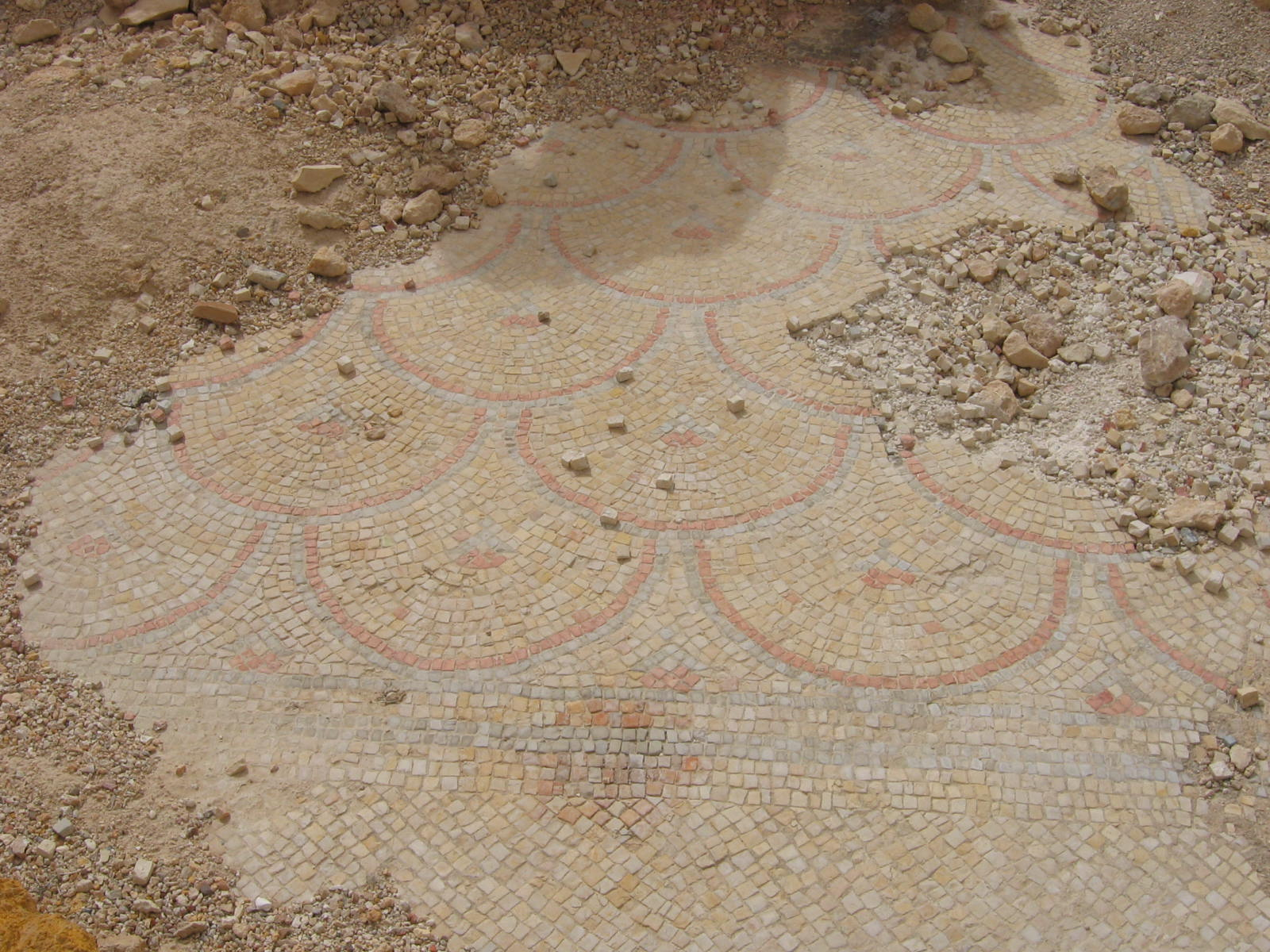
Herodian-period mosaic floor

Hyrcania is thought to have been founded by the Hasmonean king Alexander Jannaeus (ruled c. 103–76 BCE), while it's also likely that it was first established and named after Jannaeus' father, John Hyrcanus (ruled c. 134–104 BCE). The first mention of the fortress is during the reign of Salome Alexandra, the wife of Jannaeus, c. 75 BCE: Flavius Josephus relates that, along with Machaerus and Alexandrion, Hyrcania was one of three fortresses that the queen did not give up when she handed control of her strongholds to the Pharisee party.

The fortress is mentioned again in 57 BCE when Alexander of Judaea, son of Aristobulus II, fled from the Roman governor of Syria, Aulus Gabinius, who had come to suppress the revolt Alexander had stirred up against Hyrcanus II. Alexander made to re-fortify Hyrcania, but eventually surrendered to Gabinius. The fortress was then razed. The Greek geographer Strabo also notes the destruction, along with that of Alexandrion and Machaerus, the "haunts of the robbers and the treasure-holds of the tyrants", at the direction of Gabinius's superior, the Roman general Pompey.

=== Herodian fortress ===
Hyrcania is next reported in 33–32 BCE being used in an uprising against Herod the Great led by the sister of Herod's executed former rival Antigonus. The fortress was retaken, and extended; it became notorious as a place where Herod imprisoned and killed his real or presumed enemies, ultimately including his own son and heir Antipater, who was buried there.

=== Monastery of Kastellion ===
In later times Saint Sabbas the Sanctified founded a residence (cenobium) for hermits on the site in 492 CE, called the Kastellion, part of the satellite community or lavra associated with the monastery at Mar Saba 4 km to the south-west. Hermits remained until the 14th century, with a brief attempt made to re-establish the community between 1923 and 1939. This identification is based on Vita Sabae, the vita or biography of Saint Sabbas, and is generally accepted by researchers.

==== Name ====
The Greek name, Kastellion, means 'little castle'. The Syriac equivalent marda, 'fortress', has to be taken as a common noun, not proper name for the site, Marda as a location name being reserved, as we can see from the vita of St Euthymius, for Masada, the Herodian palace-fortress near the Dead Sea which was briefly resettled by Byzantine monks.

== Archaeology ==
The archaeological site is located in Area C of the West Bank.

=== Biblical identification? ===
Some have identified the Hyrcania valley below the fortress with the Biblical valley of Achor.

=== Looting ===
The valley of Achor is identified in the Copper Scroll of the Dead Sea Scrolls as the site of a great treasure. This has led to interest by treasure hunters in the area, despite it being subject to live-fire exercises by the Israeli army.

There was looting of Herodian- and Byzantine-period graves in the remote past, and destruction of the modern monastery by de Bedouin in the 1930s.

=== Ancient tunnels ===
In a close by narrow, canyon-like wadi, a total of four rock-cut tunnels have been found between 2000 and 2006 by Oren Gutfeld of the Hebrew University, all cut into the cliff wall rising on one side of the valley floor. All four are very similarly designed, steeply descending through the rock, three of them oriented north–south and one east–west. Two stepped tunnels were fully cleared of alluvial debris, but yielded only very few remains – in one of them, a Hasmonean-period clay pot and the 1st-century BCE skeleton of a young woman with severe sword cuts, not placed in a tomb; and in the other, which splits into two, a small number of Iron Age II and Early Roman potsherds and Hasmonean coins, and the skeleton of a hyrax carbon-dated to 590 BCE. All of the findings are of little use at dating the tunnels, as they could have been washed inside by the seasonal flash floods regularly occurring in this wadi. The two excavated tunnels end abruptly at 80 and 120 metres of depth, respectively.

Archaeologists proposed several dates and purposes for the tunnels, none going beyond conjecture. They could have been part of a monumental tomb associated with the fortress; part of the water system of an Iron Age II settlement located 2 km to the east; or, as hypothesized by Michal Haber of the Hebrew University, a Herodian "slave labour" project, either abandoned, or without any practical purpose beyond punishment to begin with.

=== Papyri/parchments ===
A large group of papyri, remnants of one or more monastic libraries of the 7th and 8th centuries CE, were excavated at the site in 1950 and now reside at the University of Leuven and the Rockefeller Museum. Among the text finds are 6th-century parchment fragments of a manuscript in Christian Palestinian Aramaic, designated syr^{msK}, which preserves the Western text-type of Acts 10:28–29, 32–41, next to a number of other fragments of Joshua 22?, Luke 3:1; 3b–4a and John, Colossians 1:16c–18a; 20b–21. It also produced the only find of a letter on papyrus in this Western Aramaic dialect.

=== Other findings ===
Among other findings are two pieces of a Jewish monumental stone inscription from the second or first century CE, which was inscribed in Aramaic and professionally carved using the Jewish script. Another discovery is a burial cave that most likely served as a necropolis for the monks of the Monastery of Kastellion during the Byzantine period and contains murals of 36 saints; a few of them were intentionally vandalized. In the neighboring Kh. el-Mird cave, a short Christian Palestinian Aramaic inscription was discovered. In 2023, two new inscriptions were discovered. Both are in Koine Greek, the language used in the New Testament, and written on stone, which makes them unique. One hasn't been yet deciphered, while the other, inscribed in red paint on a building stone, has been found to be a paraphrase of part of Psalm 86, where the original invocation of "the Lord" has been replaced by one of Jesus Christ, the community responsible for this adapted Psalm inscription is that of the Byzantine Christian monks, founded in the 5th century CE.

== See also ==
Hasmonean desert fortresses

- Alexandreion/Alexandrion/Alexandrium
- Cypros (fortress)
- Dok/Doq/Dagon on the Mount of Temptation
- Machaerus
