= List of Jewish historians =

A list of Jewish historians:

== A ==
- David Abulafia, professor of history, University of Cambridge (Jewish Year Book 2005, p. 218)
- Henry Abramson, Touro College, Eastern European Jewish Historian.
- Ignác Acsády, Hungarian social and economic historian
- Howard Adelson, U.S. mediaeval historian
- Cyrus Adler, U.S. historian of Jewish history
- Geoffrey Alderman, historian
- Mor Altshuler, Israeli historian of early Hasidism, Kabbalism, and Jewish messianism
- Iosif Amusin, Soviet historian
- Anne Applebaum, U.S. journalist, writer on the history of the Soviet Union, Russia, Central and Eastern Europe
- Herbert Aptheker, leader in Communist Party, historian
- Yitzhak Arad, Israeli historian of the Shoah
- Yehoshua Arieli, Israeli historian
- Walter Leonard Arnstein, U.S. historian
- Raymond Aron, French historian of sociology
- Robert Aron, French author and journalist
- Artapanus of Alexandria, 2nd Century BC historian who lived in Alexandria, Egypt
- David Asheri, Israeli classical historian
- Simon Ashkenazi, Polish modern European history
- Robert Assaraf, Moroccan writer and historian
- David Ayalon, Israeli historian of Islam and Judaism

== B ==
- Bernard Bailyn, U.S. Colonial historian
- Richard Barnett, museum curator and archaeologist (JYB 1985 p. 187)
- Salo Wittmayer Baron, American historian of Polish-Austrian Jewish ancestry
- Omer Bartov, U.S. historian of World War II and Polish Jews
- Yehuda Bauer, Czech-born Israeli historian of the Holocaust
- Zygmunt Bauman, Anglo-Polish scholar who examines the relationship between modernity and the Holocaust
- Yitzhak Bayer, History of the Jews
- George Louis Beer, U.S. historian of 16th-19th century commerce
- Emile-Auguste Begin, French physician, historian and librarian
- Max Beloff, English historian and political scientist
- Benjamin of Tudela, travel writer 1159-73
- Shlomo Ben-Ami, Israeli historian and politician
- Joaquim Bensaude Portuguese historian of astronomy and navigation
- Norman Bentwich, British lawyer and historian
- Israil Bercovici, Romanian playwright and historian
- Jay R. Berkovitz, U.S. historian of Jews in France and early modern Europe
- Isaiah Berlin, Latvian-born British historian of ideas
- Harry Bernstein, U.S. historian
- Elias Joseph Bickerman, U.S. scholar of ancient history
- Camille Bloch, French historian, archivist and librarian
- Gustave Bloch, French Graeco-Roman historian
- Herbert Bloch, German-born American classicist
- Marc Bloch, French historian of medieval France
- Solomon Frank Bloom, U.S. historian of modern Europe
- Jerome Blum, U.S. historian
- Grigory Bongard-Levin, Russian historian
- Daniel Boorstin, U.S. historian; official historian at the Smithsonian Institution & the Library of Congress
- Woodrow Wilson Borah, U.S. historian
- Randolph L. Braham U.S. historian of Hungarian Jewish ancestry; historian of the Holocaust in Hungary
- Ambrosio Brandao, Portuguese historian and soldier
- Ahron Bregman, author and journalist on the Arab-Israeli conflict
- Harry Bresslau, German historian
- Berthold Bretholz, Moravian historian
- Alan Brinkley, historian, provost of Columbia University
- Jacob Bronowski, historian of science
- Robert Brunschvig, French historian of Islam
- Max Buedinger, German modern European historian

== C ==
- Norman Cantor, mediaeval historian
- David Cesarani, British professor of history
- Robert Chazan medievalist
- Achille Coen, Italian historian
- David Cohen, Dutch historian and Jewish leader
- Gustave Cohen, Belgian historian of mediaeval French literature and theatre
- Mark Cohen, American historian of the Jews under medieval Islam
- Norman Cohn, British historian
- Robert Cohen, French historian of ancient Greece
- Stephen F. Cohen, American historian of the Soviet Union
- Michael Confino, Israeli historian
- Martin van Creveld, Dutch-born Israeli military historian

== D ==
- Robert Davidsohn, German historian of mediaeval Florence
- Natalie Zemon Davis, American historian of France
- Lucy Dawidowicz, American Holocaust historian
- Hermann Dessau, German historian and philologist
- Isaac Deutscher, Polish-born British Marxist historian and political scientist
- Max Dimont, Finnish-American Jew and popular historian and author
- Martin Duberman, U.S. historian and playwright
- Simon Dubnow, Russian-born Latvian historian; author of the "History of the Jews"; shot by Nazis
- Ariel Durant, American historian; author of The Story of Civilization.

== E ==
- Abba Eban, Israeli writer about Israeli and Jewish history
- Ludwig Edelstein, ancient medicine
- Alfred Edersheim Australian Jewish historian and Biblical scholar
- Victor Ehrenberg, German historian of the ancient world
- Louis Eisenman, French historian of Europe
- Abraham Eisenstadt, U.S. historian
- Stanley Elkins, U.S. historian
- Amos Elon, Vienna-born Israeli. Historian of Germany and modern Israel
- Geoffrey Rudolph Elton, German-born British historian of Tudor England
- Carlo Errera, Italian geographer and historian of exploration
- Richard Ettinghausen, German-born U.S. art historian

== F ==
- Orlando Figes, British historian of Russia
- Louis Filler, U.S. historian
- Sidney Fine, U.S. historian
- Samuel Finer, British political scientist and historian
- Norman Finkelstein, American historian
- Moses I. Finley, Classical Historian.
- Simha Flapan, Israeli historian
- Robert Fogel, American economic historian and Nobel laureate
- Eric Foner, American historian and president of American Historical Association 2000
- Joseph Friedenson, Holocaust historian
- Heinrich Friedjung, Moravian historian and politician
- Henry Friedlander, German-born American historian of the Holocaust
- Saul Friedländer, Czech-born French-Israeli historian of the Holocaust
- Yisrael Friedman, former lecturer at the Tel Aviv University and the Ben-Gurion University of the Negev
- Alexander Fuks, Israeli classical historian

== G ==
- Peter Gay, German-born American historian of ideas
- Leo Gershoy, U.S. historian
- Felix Gilbert, U.S. political historian
- Martin Gilbert, British historian
- Carlo Ginzburg, Italian historian
- Gustave Glotz, French ancient Greek historian
- Shelomo Dov Goitein Arabist, historian, ethnographer
- Eric F. Goldman, U.S. modern historian
- Yosef Goldman, author of Hebrew Printing in America
- Yossi Goldstein, Israeli biographer
- Ernst Gombrich, Austrian-born British art historian
- Cassandra Good, PhD in history from the University of Pennsylvania.
- Martin Goodman (historian) (Jewish Year Book 2005 p. 215)
- Gabriel Gorodetsky, historian of Second World War
- Louis Reichenthal Gottschalk, U.S. historian of modern Europe
- Heinrich Graetz, Polish-born German historian
- Jack Granatstein, Canadian military historian
- Jacob Greenwald, Master of European History University of Haifa
- Jan T. Gross, Polish historian
- Philip Guedalla, biographer
- Hans G. Guterbock, German-born hittitologist

== H ==
- Joseph Hakohen, 16th-century historian, Italy
- Elie Halevy, French historian, "A History of the English People in the 19th century 1915-30"
- George W. F. Hallgarten, historian
- Louis Halphen, French mediaevalist
- Theodore Stephen Hamerow, U.S. historian
- Marceli Handelsman, Polish constitutional and political historian
- Oscar Handlin, U.S. social historian
- Abraham Harkavy, Belarusian-born Russian historian
- Henry Harrisse, U.S. historiographer
- Ludo Moritz Hartmann, Austrian historian and statesman
- Henri Hauser, French ancient and mediaeval historian
- Sigmund Herzberg-Fraenkel, Austrian historian
- Jack H. Hexter, U.S. historian of modern Europe
- Uriel Heyd, Israeli historian of Islam
- Raul Hilberg, Austrian-born American Holocaust historian
- Gertrude Himmelfarb, American historian of Victorian Britain
- Heinrich Otto Hirschfield, German Roman historian
- Eric Hobsbawm, Egyptian-born British Marxist historian
- Richard Hofstadter, U.S. political historian
- David Horowitz, American historian
- Helen Lefkowitz Horowitz, American historian
- Irving Howe, American historian
- Samuel Justin Hurwitz, U.S. historian
- Harold Melvin Hyman, U.S. historian

== I ==
- Siegfried Isaacsohn, German historian
- Jonathan Israel, British historian (Jewish Year Book 2005, p. 215)

== J ==
- Joseph Jacobs , editor of the Jewish Encyclopedia
- Oscar Isaiah Janowsky, U.S. historian of modern Europe and Jews
- Lisa Jardine, British historian (ref see List of British Jews#Historians)
- Louis de Jong, Dutch historian and journalist
- Matthew Josephson, U.S. social historian
- Titus Flavius Josephus, ancient Jewish historian

== K ==
- Donald Kagan, American historian of ancient Greece
- Frederick Kagan, American military historian
- David Kahn, American historian of cryptography
- Ernst Kantorowicz, German-born American mediaevalist
- Efraim Karsh, Israeli historian
- Jacob Katz, was Professor Emeritus, Faculty of Social Sciences, Hebrew University of Jerusalem, and author or editor of many books on medieval and modern Jewish social history
- Steven T. Katz, U.S. historian of the Holocaust
- Shmuel Katz, Israeli historian
- Solomon Katz, U.S. historian
- Elie Kedourie, Iraq-born British historian (Jewish Year Book 1990 p. 202)
- Morton Keller, U.S. historian
- Abraham Khalfon, Jewish historian of Tripoli
- James Klugmann, communist historian
- Richard Koebner, Israeli German historian
- Hans Kohn, U.S. political and social historian
- Hilton Kramer, American art historian
- Michael Kraus, U.S. historian
- Leonard Krieger, U.S. historian
- Hyman Kublin, U.S. historian of the far east
- Thomas Samuel Kuhn, U.S. historian of science
- Otto Kurz, historian (Jewish Year Book 1975 p. 214)

== L ==
- Leopold Labedz, Anglo-Polish historian of Communism
- Gyula Lanczy, Hungarian economic historian
- David Landes, U.S. economic historian
- Benno Landsberger, Austrian-born assyriologist
- Thomas Laqueur, UC Berkeley professor, historian of Britain since 1509: social, medical and sexual historian
- Walter Laqueur, German-born American historian of modern Europe, the Middle East & terrorism
- Max Laserson, Latvian historian
- Michael Ledeen, American historian of Fascism
- Sidney Lee, second editor of the Dictionary of National Biography
- Arthur Lefkowitz, American historian of the American Revolution
- Mary Lefkowitz, American classical scholar
- Gerda Lerner, Austrian-born American feminist historian
- Max Lerner, U.S. journalist and social historian
- Joseph Levenson, U.S. specialist in Chinese history
- Wilhelm Levison, German mediaevalist
- Arthur Levy, French historian
- Leonard William Levy, U.S. political historian
- Paul Lévy, French linguistic historian
- Bernard Lewis, British orientalist, History of Islam
- David Malcolm Lewis, British historian. (Jewish Year Book 1995 p. 193)
- Felix Liebermann, German mediaevalist
- Ephraim Lipson, British economic historian
- Deborah Lipstadt, U.S. Holocaust historian
- Victor Loewe, German historian and archivist
- Robert Sabatino Lopez, U.S. mediaevalist
- Sidney Low, British statesman, journalist and political historian
- Samuel Lozinski, Russian historian
- John Lukacs, Hungarian-US historian
- Alberto Lumbroso, Italian historian of the Napoleonic period
- Giacomo Lumbroso, Italian classical historian and archaeologist

== M ==
- Hyam Maccoby
- Lothar Machtan
- Philip Magnus-Allcroft, biographer
- Frank Manuel, U.S. historian
- Henrik Marczali, Hungarian historian
- Shula Marks, South African-British expert on African history (Jewish Year Book 2005 p. 215)
- Ludwig Markus, German expert in Abyssinian and Beta Israeli history
- Michael Marrus, Canadian Shoah historian
- Karl Marx, historian and philosopher
- Arno J. Mayer, Luxembourg-born American historian
- Gustav Mayer, German political and social historian
- Milton Meltzer, American historian of Afro-American history
- Ezra Mendelsohn, Polish historian of the Jewish community in Poland
- Isaak Mints, Ukrainian-born Russian historian
- Mark Borisovich Mitin, Russian politician and historian
- Arnaldo Momigliano, Italian-British historian.(Jewish Year Book 1985 p. 188)
- Felice Momigliano, Italian philosopher and historian
- Benny Morris, Israeli historian of Israel
- Richard Brandon Morris, U.S. constitutional historian
- Louis C. Morton, U.S. historian
- George Mosse, German-born American historian of ideas
- Salomon Munk, German-born French historian
- Friederich Munzer, German classical scholar
- Gustavus Myers, U.S. social historian

== N ==
- Nadav Na`aman, Israeli historian of biblical times
- Oskar Nachod, German historian and bibliographer
- Lewis Bernstein Namier, Polish-born British historian
- Abraham Nasatir, U.S. historian of west and southwest U.S.
- Benzion Netanyahu, was a Medieval Jewish historian
- Alexander Nove, economic historian (Jewish Year Book 1990 p. 202)

== O ==
- Julius Oppert, Assyriologist
- Michael Oren, Israeli historian
- Leo Oppenheim, Assyriologist

== P ==
- Abraham Pais, Dutch-born American historian
- Francis Palgrave, British historian
- Erwin Panofsky, German-born American art historian
- Ilan Pappé, Israeli historian
- Peter Paret, German-born American historian of German history
- Herbert S. Parmet, political historian and biographer
- Robert D. Parmet, labor and immigration historian and biographer
- Max Perlbach, German mediaevalist
- Martin Phillipson, German modern historian and communal leader
- Koppel Pinson, U.S. political and social historian
- Daniel Pipes, American historian of the Middle East
- Richard Pipes, Polish-born American historian of Russia
- Karl Polanyi, economist and historian
- Leon Poliakov, French historian of anti-semitism
- Sidney Pomerantz, U.S. historian
- Richard Popkin, historian of philosophy
- Yehoshua Porath, Israeli historian
- Samuel A. Portnoy, American historian of Jewish and East European history
- George Posener, French Egyptologist
- Michael Postan, British historian (Jewish Year Book 1985 p. 188)
- Joshua Prawer, Israeli historian of the kingdom of Jerusalem and the crusades
- Alfred Francis Pribram (de), Anglo-Austrian diplomatic historian.
- Alfred Pribram, Austrian historian and publicist
- Jacob Psantir, Rumanian historian of the Jews

== R ==
- Theodore Rabb, Renaissance historian
- Ronald Radosh, American historian of espionage
- Armin Rappaport, U.S. historian
- Uriel Rappaport, Israeli historian of the Second Temple period
- Sidney Ratner, U.S. economic historian
- Jehuda Reinharz, U.S.-Israeli historian of modern Jewish history
- Ludwig Riess, German constitutional historian
- Emanuel Ringelblum, Polish historian of Warsaw Ghetto
- Maxime Rodinson, French historian
- Samuele Romanin, Italian historian of classical Rome and Judaism
- Nello Roselli, Italian historian
- Ron Rosenbaum, American historian-journalist, author of Explaining Hitler (1998)
- Arthur Rosenberg, German historian and Zionist
- Nathan Rosenstein, American historian of the Roman Republic
- Michael Alan Ross, American writer and author of BostonWalks The Jewish Friendship Trail Guidebook
- Walt Whitman Rostow, American economic historian
- Cecil Roth, British historian and editor of the Encyclopaedia Judaica
- Hans Rothfels, German-born American historian
- W.D.Rubinstein, American-born Australian historian in Britain
- Suzanne Rutland, Australian historian

== S ==
- Abram L. Sachar, American historian
- Howard M. Sachar, American historian
- Julius Salomon, Danish historian and archivist
- Shlomo Sand, Israeli post-Zionist historian
- Simon Schama, British historian
- J. Salwyn Schapiro, American historian of modern Europe
- Leonard Schapiro, historian
- Meyer Schapiro, Lithuanian-born American art historian
- David Schoenbaum, modern German history
- Moses Schorr, historian of Polish Jews
- Debra Schultz, American feminist historian
- Yossi Schwartz
- Hugh Sebag-Montefiore, British World War 2 historian
- Simon Sebag Montefiore, British historian of Russia
- Tom Segev, Israeli historian
- Arturo Segre, Italian political and commercial historian
- Avraham Sela, Israeli historian
- Enrique Semo, Mexican historian
- Bernard Semmel, U.S. historian
- Michael Shamah, British Archaeologist
- Moshe Shamir, Israeli writer and historian
- Leeor Shimron, American historian
- Avi Shlaim, Israeli historian
- Joseph Shulim, U.S. historian
- Bernhard von Simson, German mediaevalist
- Paul Simson, German historian
- Charles Singer, British historian of science and medicine
- Ephraim Avigdor Speiser, American assyriologist and archeologist
- Louis Snyder, U.S. historian
- Arthur Stein (historian), Austrian historian of classical Rome
- Aurel Stein , archeologist
- Henri Stein, French bibliographer and historian
- Samuel Steinherz, Czechoslovak mediaevalist
- Alfred Stern, Swiss social historian
- Fritz Stern, German-born American historian
- Menahem Stern, Israeli historian of ancient Judaism
- Zeev Sternhell, Israeli historian of French fascism
- Barry Supple, British economic historian (Jewish Year Book, 2005, p. 215)

== T ==
- Hayim Tadmor, Assyriologist
- Jacob Talmon, Israeli political and social historian
- Frank Tannenbaum, U.S. economic historian
- John Thorn, U.S. baseball historian; official historian of Major League Baseball
- Rosa Levin Toubin, Jewish Texan historian
- Hans Trefousse, U.S. historian
- Barbara Tuchman, U.S. journalist and historian

== U ==
- Adam Ulam, Polish-born American historian of Marxism, Communism, and 20th Century Russian history
- Irwin Unger, U.S. political and social historian

== V ==
- Geza Vermes, Hungarian-born British historian

== W ==
- Joanna Waley-Cohen, English historian now in New York
- Bernard Wasserstein, British historian of the Middle East and Europe
- Eugen Weber, Modern European History
- Gerhard Weinberg, German-born American historian of World War Two
- Robert Weinberg, American historian of Russia
- Bernard Weisberger, U.S. historian
- Eduard Wertheimer, Hungarian historian of the 19th century
- Helene Wieruszowski, German-U.S. historian
- Mordecai Wilensky, American/Israeli historian of Jewish history
- Bertram Wolfe, U.S. Soviet historian
- Michael Wolffsohn, Israeli-born German historian
- Leonard Woolf, British historian of economics

== Y ==
- Zvi Yavetz, Israeli historian of ancient Rome
- Yosef Hayim Yerushalmi (1932–2009), Jewish History, Culture & Society
- Aryeh Yitzhaki, Israeli historian

== Z ==
- Abraham Zacuto, historian and scientist
- Rehavam Zeevi, Israeli historian
- Oscar Zeichner, U.S. historian
- Alfred Zimmern, British political scientist and authority on International Relations
- Carl A. Zimring, American environmental historian
- Howard Zinn, American historian
