= Beth-Anath =

Biblical place

Beth-Anath was mentioned in the Bible as "one of the fenced cities that fell to the lot of Naphtali (Joshua 19:38), and from which the Canaanites were not driven out (Judges 1:33)."

== Early history ==
Among the place names found in a list of Ramses II, Beth-anath remains the only name that clearly refers to the Galilee according to Judges 1:33.

Beth-Anath has been translated to mean "temple of Anat", a Canaanite goddess linked to a Sumerian predecessor called Ninhursag.

Beth-Anath continued to be settled by the native Canaanites, even after Israel's conquest of the land during the early Iron Age. The Zenon Papyri (mid 3rd-century BCE) mentions a certain estate belonging to Apollonius in Βαιτανατα (Beth-anath), a way-stop along the route traveled by the Zenon party as it passed through ancient Palestine.

== Identification ==
Several places have been identified with Beth-Anath.

=== 'Anin ===
It has been suggested than 'Anin is the site of ancient Beth Anath, or Greek: Batanaia, mentioned in Eusebius' Onomasticon and in the Tosefta.

=== Aynata ===
Aynata in Lebanon was suggested by van de Velde in 1854, by W.M. Thomson in 1859, and later Victor Guérin to be the ancient site of Beth-Anath. The same view was held by historical geographer Georg Kampffmeyer (1892).

=== Bi'ina ===
Bi'ina in the Beit HaKerem Valley which divides Upper Galilee from the Lower Galilee was suggested by Ze'ev Safrai as being the biblical Beth-Anath, a view that had been established long before him, by a host of archaeologists and historical geographers: W.F. Albright, (1921/1922: 19–20); Neubauer (1868:235–ff.); Abel (1928, pp. 409–415; 1938: 266); Alt (PJB 22, 1926, pp. 55–ff.; 24, 1928, p. 87); Saarisalo ("Boundary", p. 189); Rafael Frankel, et al. (2001:136); Aviam (2004:53); Reeg (1989:72–73). The site dates back to the Iron Age. Initially, Albright thought that Beth-Anath might be Tell Belat, but later changed his mind for the site at Bi'ina (Dayr al Ba'ana), based on the name given for the village in the Jerusalem Talmud (Orlah 3:7), and which more closely resembles the site's present name.

Albright conjectured that the ancient site of Beth-Anath was probably situated at the mound of Jelamet el-Bi'ina, less than a mile southeast of the present site of Bi'ina, a place surrounded by fertile fields. The word jelameh, meaning "hill" or "mound," is sometimes employed instead of tell. Israeli archaeologist Yoram Tsafrir remained undecided where to place Beth-anath, saying that it could have either been where is now Bi'ina, or where is now Bu'eine.

=== Bu'eine Nujeidat ===
Tsafrir et al. suggested that Beth-Anath could be at Bu'eine Nujeidat, or Bi'ina.

=== Dephne ===
A 4th-century CE Greek Diocletianic boundary stone from the First Tetrarchy, found during ploughing c. 0.5 km west of modern Kibbutz Dafna in the Upper Hula Valley (the ancient Daphne district at the springs of the “Little Jordan,” just southwest of Tel Dan), records the boundaries of two villages, explicitly naming Beth Anath (Βηθθ Ἀνάθης) together with a second “Beth–” toponym (read as Beth Achon?). On this basis, Johannes Heinrichs argued that Beth Anath should be sought in the Daphne region of the northern Hula/Upper Jordan Valley, near the Jordan headwaters, rather than at more southerly or purely assonance-based proposals, and noted that such a placement is compatible with (i) the Naphtali setting implied by the biblical attestations, and (ii) the Ptolemaic-period Bait Anata of the Zenon archive, understood as an estate taking its Semitic name from a nearby village in the same general area.

=== Hinah ===
Historical geographer Samuel Klein (1934:18–34 ) placed Beth-Anath in Hinah, a town on the southeast side of Mount Hermon. His view is supported by Grintz (1964:67), who cites Josephus (Antiquities 5.1.22) as corroborating Klein's view, insofar that Naphtali's territory is said to have extended as far as Damascus in the east.

=== Safad el-Battikh ===
Aharoni (1957:70-74) held the view that Beth-Anath was to be identified with Safed el-Battikh, in the Bint Jbeil District. Aharoni cites Eusebius' Onomasticon and his mention of Batanaia being distant 15 miles from Caesarea, a place thought by Aharoni to refer to Cesarea Philippi (1957:73). According to him, this would put Batanaia (=Beth-Anath) in the vicinity of Safed el-Battikh.

Tell 'Ant (She'ar Yeshuv)

== Diocletianic boundary stone ==
A Greek boundary stone erected during the reign of Diocletian (284–305 CE) records the village name Βηθθ Ἀνάθης (Beth-Anath) as part of the late Roman territorial demarcations associated with Paneas (Banias) in the northern Hula Valley. On the basis of spatial placement and comparative toponymy, Roy Marom proposes locating this Beth-Anath with Tell ʿAnt in the vicinity of She'ar Yashuv. The proposal relies on the convergence of epigraphic attestation, geographic context, and archaeological remains indicating Roman–Byzantine occupation in the area, rather than on toponymy alone.

== See also ==
- List of minor biblical places#Beth-anath

== Bibliography ==
- Abel, F.M. (1928). "La Liste géographique du Papyrus 71 de Zénon". RB (in French).
- Abel, F.M. (1938). Géographie de la Palestine, géographie physique et historique (Géographie politique, Les villes) (in French). Vol. 2. Paris: J. Gabalda.
- Aharoni, Y. (1957). The Settlement of the Tribes of Israel in the Upper Galilee. Jerusalem: Magnes Press.
- Albright, W.F. (1922). "Contribution to the Historical Geography of Palestine". Annual of the American Schools of Oriental Research. 2–3: 1–46.
- Albright, W.F. (1923). Warren J. Moulton (ed.). "Contribution to the Historical Geography of Palestine". The Annual of the American Schools of Oriental Research. 2–3. New Haven: Yale University Press: 1–46. doi:10.2307/3768450. JSTOR 3768450.
- Aviam, Mordechai (2004). Jews, Pagans and Christians in the Galilee. Vol. Land of Galilee 1. Rochester, N.Y.: University of Rochester Press, Institute of Galilean Archaeology. ISBN 1-58046-171-9.
- Frankel, Rafael; Getzov, Nimrod; Aviam, Mordechai; Degani, Avi (2001). "Settlement Dynamics and Regional Diversity in Ancient Upper Galilee (Archaeological Survey of Upper Galilee)". Israel Antiquities Authority. 14.
- Grintz, Jehoshua (1964). Studies in the Bible: presented to M.H. Segal. Jerusalem: Kiryat Sepher.
- Guérin, V. (1880). Description Géographique Historique et Archéologique de la Palestine (in French). Vol. 3: Galilee, pt. 2. Paris: L'Imprimerie Nationale.
- Kampffmeyer, G. [in German] (1892). "Alte Namen im heutigen Palästina und Syrien". Zeitschrift des Deutschen Palästina-Vereins. 15: 1– 33, 65- 116.
- Kitto, J. (1862). Encyclopedia of Biblical Literature. Edinburgh A. & C. Black. p. 344.
- Klein, S. (1934). "Notes on History of Large Estates in Palestine". Yediot - Bulletin of the Jewish Palestine Exploration Society. 1.
- Naʼaman, Nadav (2005). Canaan in the 2nd Millennium B.C.E. Eisenbrauns. pp. 248–. ISBN 978-1-57506-113-9.
- Neubauer, A. (1868). La géographie du Talmud : mémoire couronné par l'Académie des inscriptions et belles-lettres (in French). Paris: Lévy. OCLC 474727878.
- Reeg, Gottfried (1989). Die Ortsnamen Israels nach der rabbinischen Literatur (in German). Wiesbaden: L. Reichert.
- Safrai, Z. (1976). "Beth-Anath". Sinai (in Hebrew). 78. Jerusalem: Mossad Harav Kook: 18–34.
- Safrai, Z. (1985). Chapters of Galilee, During Mishnaic and Talmudic Times: Pirkei Galil (in Hebrew). Jerusalem. p. 62.
- Tcherikover, V. (1933). "Palestine in the Levant of the Papyric of Zenon". Tarbiz (in Hebrew). 33. Institute of Jewish Studies (now Mandel Institute for Jewish Studies) at the Hebrew University of Jerusalem: 47–226.
- Thomson, W.M. (1859). The Land and the Book: Or, Biblical Illustrations Drawn from the Manners and Customs, the Scenes and Scenery, of the Holy Land. Vol. 1 (1 ed.). New York: Harper & brothers.
- Tsafrir, Y.; Leah Di Segni; Judith Green (1994). (TIR): Tabula Imperii Romani. Iudaea, Palestina: Eretz Israel in the Hellenistic, Roman and Byzantine Periods; Maps and Gazetteer. Jerusalem: Israel Academy of Sciences and Humanities. p. 80. ISBN 965-208-107-8.
- Velde, van de, C.W.M. (1854). Narrative of a journey through Syria and Palestine in 1851 and 1852. Vol. 1. William Blackwood and son.
