= David Asheri =

Italian-Israeli historian of Ancient Greece (1925–2000)

- דוד אשרי
- Born: 1 November 1925; Florence, Italy
- Died: 3 February 2000 (aged 74); Jerusalem, Israel
- Education: Hebrew University of Jerusalem
- Occupation: Historian of ancient Greece

David Asheri (Hebrew: דוד אשרי) (1 November 1925, Florence – 3 February 2000, Jerusalem), born David Bonaventura, was an Italian-Israeli historian. Asheri is regarded as "one of the most distinguished scholars of ancient Greece". He is perhaps best known for his many contributions to the scholarship of Herodotus.

== Life ==
Asheri was born in Florence into a prosperous Jewish family. His father, Enzo Bonaventura, was a prominent psychologist and intellectual with Zionist sympathies. In 1938, Enzo Bonaventura, because of his Jewish faith, lost his position as Chair of Psychology at the University of Florence under the new race laws.

=== Israel ===
In Jerusalem, Asheri was sent to the Ma’al School. During the War of Independence, he fought with the Moria battalion of the Palmach, the strike force of the Haganah founded in 1941.

On 13 April 1948 he lost his father. Enzo Bonaventura was a victim of the notorious attack on Hadassah, while he was going to work in the medical convoy escorted by the Haganah militia as it was on its way to the hospital on Mount Scopus. In total, 97 of the 105 passengers died, among them also Anna di Gioacchino Cassuto, the daughter-in-law of professor Umberto Cassuto.

=== Hebrew University of Jerusalem ===
In 1949 he changed his surname to Asheri, later adopted by his brothers, and forsaking his Italian surname as was normal. In 1952 Asheri enrolled at the Hebrew University, studying history and Greek philosophy. Between 1952 and 1961 he obtained various qualifications including a PhD, while working as a librarian at the National and University Library. His doctoral thesis, written under the supervision of Professor Alexander Fuks, was described as "a small masterpiece" and "rapidly recognised by the academic community as a starting point for all subsequent studies of landed property in ancient Greece.

He became a professor of Greek and Roman history and, like his father, obtained a permanent position at the Hebrew University, becoming a full professor in 1978. In 1991 Asheri was nominated a member of the Israel Academy of Sciences and Humanities. In 1993 he retired, but continued to research and publish his work in a number of academic journals.

He was a visiting lecturer at the University of San Marino and at the University of Florence in the Faculty of Letters, chaired by Guido Clemente. Asheri was a friend of fellow Italian scholars such as Arnaldo Momigliano, who greatly inspired him, and the Roman history scholar Emilio Gabba. For the editorship of Einaudi’s I greci he collaborated with Salvatore Settis and others.

In 2007 Greeks Between East and West: Essays in Greek Literature and History in Memory of David Asheri was published by the Israel Academy of Sciences and Humanities. It was edited by Gabriel Herman and Israel Shatzman.

== Bibliography ==
- 'Carthaginians and Greeks' (Chapter 16), The Cambridge Ancient History, Volume 4, (Cambridge: Cambridge University Press, 1988)
- 'Sicily, 478-431 b.c.' (Chapter 7), The Cambridge Ancient History, Volume 5, (Cambridge: CUP, 1992)
- I Greci, eight-volume history of ancient Greece (Italian), Editor: D. Asheri (Rome, Italy: Einaudi 1996)
- A Commentary on Herodotus Books I-IV, co-author (Oxford: Oxford University Press, 2011)
