= Joseph Goldstein =

Joseph Goldstein may refer to:

- Joseph Goldstein (legal scholar) (1923–2000), American legal academic
- Joseph Goldstein (writer) (born 1944), Buddhist teacher and writer
- Joseph I. Goldstein (1939–2015), American engineer
- Joseph L. Goldstein (born 1940), Nobel Prize–winning biochemist
- Joe Goldstein (1927–2009), New York City sports publicist
- Yossi Goldstein (born 1947), Israeli historian
