= Isaiah Gafni =

Historian

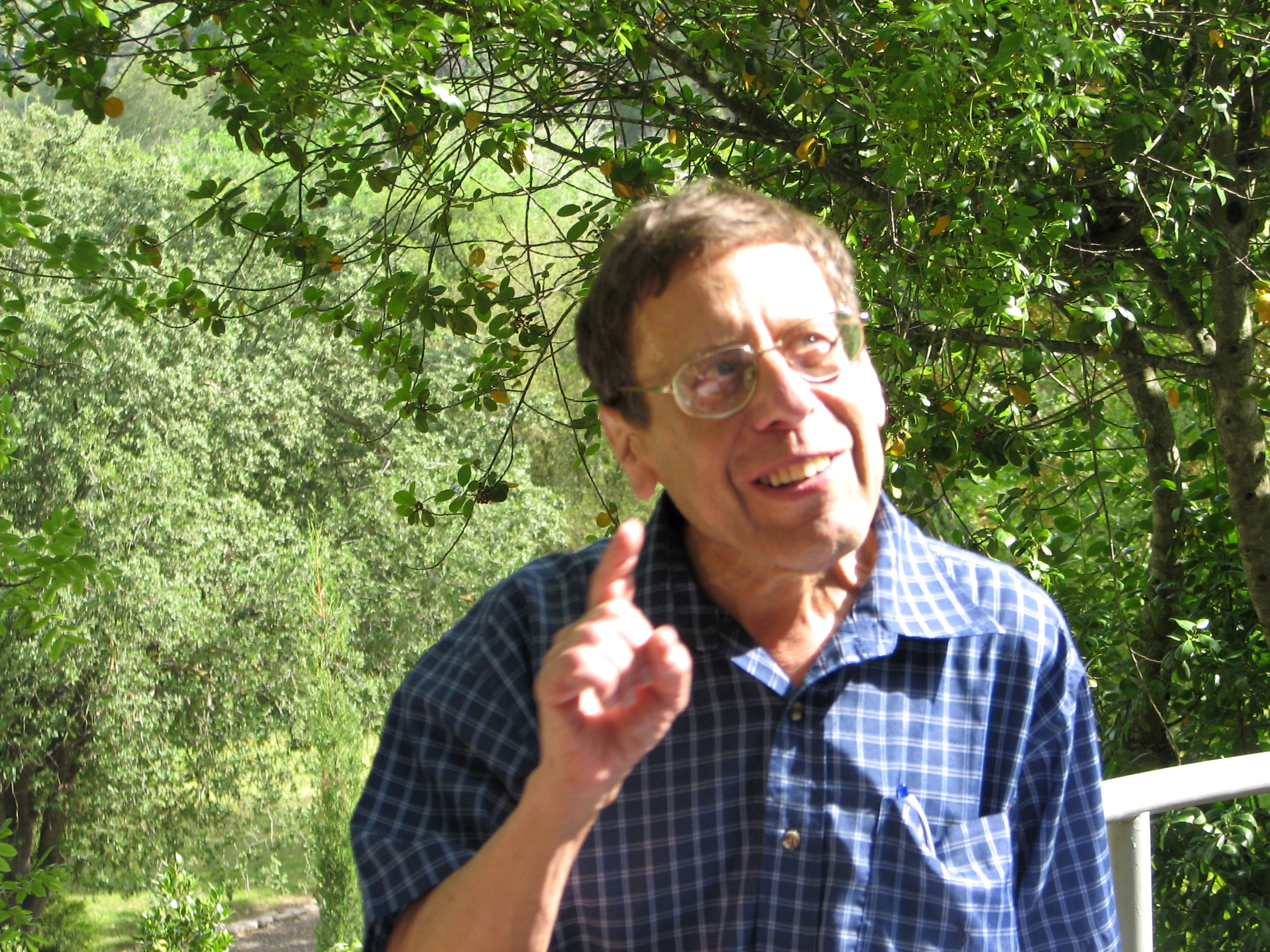
- Born: 1944 (age 81–82)
- Occupation: Professor of Jewish History

Academic background
- Education: Hebrew University of Jerusalem
- Doctoral advisor: Menahem Stern Shmuel Safrai

Academic work
- Discipline: Jewish History
- Sub-discipline: the Second Temple and Talmudic periods
- Institutions: Hebrew University of Jerusalem

Isaiah Gafni (born 1944) is a historian of Judaism in the Second Temple and Talmudic periods. He is the Sol Rosenbloom Chair of Jewish History at Hebrew University of Jerusalem, and president (since 2016) of Shalem College in Jerusalem.

== Biography ==
Isaiah Gafni was born in New York. He immigrated to Israel in 1958. He has a Ph.D in Jewish History, Hebrew University of Jerusalem (1978), under the direction of Menahem Stern and Shmuel Safrai; MA, Hebrew University (1969); BA, Hebrew University (1966).

== Academic career ==
Gafni is interested in the attitudes of the Jews of the Second Temple towards the Land of Israel. His research focuses on how Judaism was reshaped during the years the Jews after the Temple's destruction. He has authored numerous academic articles, three books, and he edited over fifteen books regarding a wide range of topics in Jewish History.

Gafni's focus is research on political, social and religious Jewish life during the Second Temple Period (516 BCE – 70 CE). His book The Jews of Talmudic Babylonia: A Social and Cultural History was honored with the 1992 Holon Municipality Prize for Jewish studies. Additionally he has written more than 100 entries in the Encyclopaedia Judaica. Gafni's most recent book, titled, Land, Center and Diaspora: Jewish Constructs in Late Antiquity was originally delivered in a series of lectures in Oxford called the Third Jacobs Lectures in Rabbinic Thought in January 1994. In the book he seeks to "shed some light on what the Jews of the period (post destruction of the Second Temple), in Judea, as well as in diaspora, might have thought about their particular situation as a scattered people, and how these thoughts translated into concrete policies and subsequent measures that shaped and defined relationships among the various Jewish communities of Late Antiquity."

The most recent works published by Gafni are The Jewish Family – Metaphor and Memory, explaining the institution of Jewish marriage in Rabbinic times, and Irano-Judaica II which articulates the expressions and types of "local-patriotism" among the Jews of Sasanian Babylonia.

Gafni has been a professor in the Hebrew University of Jerusalem for over 40 years and a visiting professor at Yale University and Brown University. He has offered courses entitled "The Beginnings of Judaism", "The Great World Religions", and has lectured in institutions throughout Israel and North America.

== Published works ==
Books

- Babylonian Jewry and Its Institutions in the Period of the Talmud (Hebrew), Jerusalem 1975, 117pp.
- "The Jewish Community of Babylonia" (English trans. of chapter 1 of the above), Immanuel vol. 8 (1978), pp. 58–68
- "Die judische Gemeinde in Babylonien und ihre Institutionem" (German trans. of chapter 1 of the above), Freiburger Rundbrief, vol. 30 (1978) pp. 204–210
- The Jews of Babylonia in the Talmudic Era – A Social and Cultural History (Hebrew), Jerusalem 1990, 312pp. (Received the Holon Municipality Prize for Jewish Studies, 1992)
- Russian translation of the above, Moscow 2003, 392pp.
- Land, Center and Diaspora – Jewish Constructs in Late Antiquity, Sheffield 1997, 136pp.

=== Editorships ===
- The Samaritans, by Itzhak ben Zvi, 2nd revised edition, Jerusalem 1970
- Author and Editor: From Jerusalem to Yavne – Israel's Open University, Tel Aviv 1977 (Hebrew; translations in English and Spanish)
- Priesthood and Monarchy – Studies in the Historical Relationships of Religion and State (Hebrew; ed. with G. Motzkin), Jerusalem 1983, 311pp.
- Studies in Jewish History – The Second Temple Period., by M. Stern (Hebrew; ed. with M. Amit and M.D. Herr), Jerusalem 1991, 670pp.
- The Kingdom of Herod, by M. Stern (Hebrew; edited with Ch. Stern), Tel-Aviv 1992, 112pp.
- Sanctity of Life and Martyrdom – Studies in Memory of Amir Yekutiel (Hebrew; edited with A. Ravitzky), Jerusalem 1992, 312pp.
- Jews and Judaism in the Second Temple, Mishna and Talmud Period- 2 Studies in Honor of Shmuel Safrai (Hebrew; edited with A. Oppenheimer and M. Stern), Jerusalem 1993, 408pp.
- The Jews in the Hellenistic-Roman World – Studies in Memory of Menahem Stern, edited with A. Oppenheimer and D. Schwartz, Jerusalem 1996, Hebrew Section 488pp.; English Section 158pp.
- Sexuality and the Family in History: Collected Essays (Hebrew; edited with I. Bartal), Jerusalem 1998, 432pp.
- Kehal Yisrael: Jewish Self-Rule Through the Ages, vol. 1: The Ancient Period, Jerusalem 2001 (Hebrew)
- Center and Diaspora: The Land of Israel and the Diaspora in the Second Temple, Mishna and Talmud Periods, Jerusalem 2004, xiii + 242pp.
