= Shmuel Safrai =

Israeli historian

- שמואל ספראי
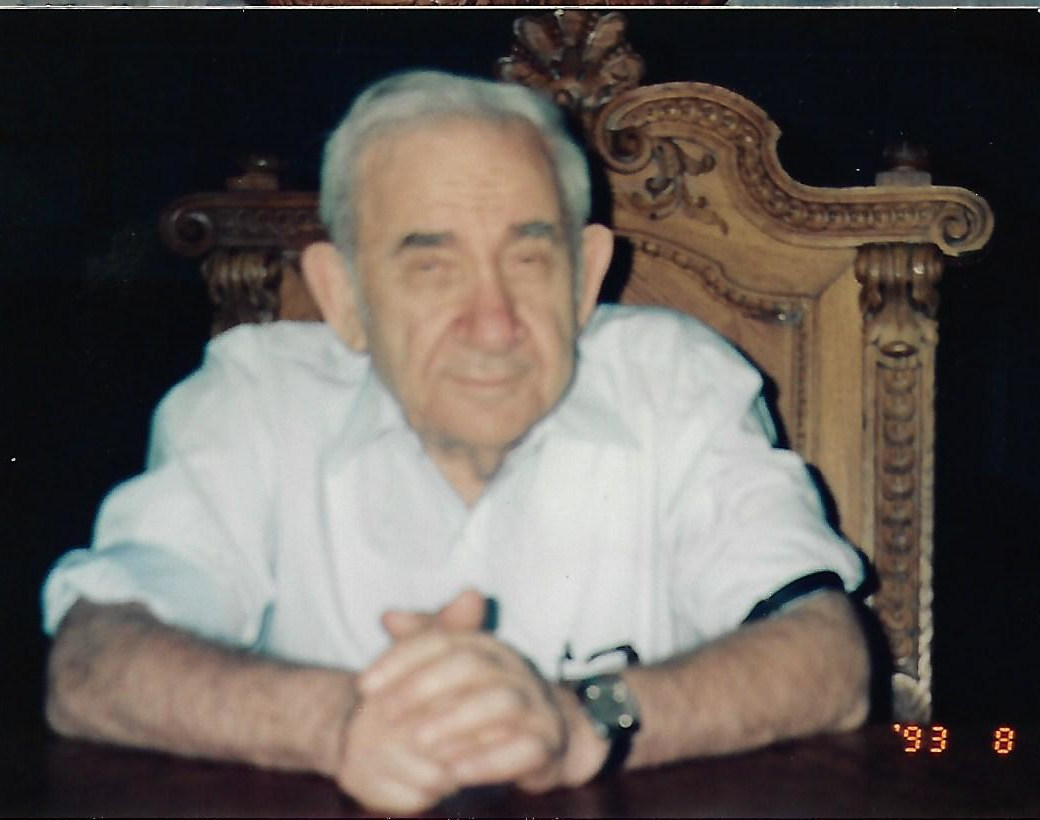
- Prof. Safrai, August 1993
- Born: June 18, 1919; Warsaw, Poland
- Died: July 16, 2003 (aged 84)
- Children: Ze'ev Safrai; Chana Safrai
- Awards: Jerusalem Prize (1986); Israel Prize (2002)

Academic background
- Doctoral advisor: Gedaliah Alon

Academic work
- Discipline: Jewish History
- Institutions: Hebrew University of Jerusalem
- Doctoral students: Yisrael Friedman Isaiah Gafni

Shmuel Safrai (Hebrew: שמואל ספראי; June 18, 1919 – July 16, 2003) was Professor Emeritus of Jewish History at Hebrew University and laurate of the Israel Prize for Land of Israel studies for 2002.

== Biography ==
Safrai born in 1919 in Warsaw, Poland, and immigrated to Land of Israel at the age of three (1922). He lived in the Etz Chaim neighborhood of Jerusalem during his childhood and youth. He studied at the Merkaz HaRav Yeshiva for one year, and at the Mizrachi Teachers' Training College in Jerusalem for two years. From 1951 to 1955 he was a member of Kibbutz Sde Eliyahu.

During the 1940s and 1950s, he pursued his studies at the Hebrew University, earning a doctorate in 1960 for his thesis, which focused on pilgrimage practices during the Second Temple period. By the late 1960s, Safrai was appointed as a professor at the Hebrew University, and in 1978, he achieved the rank of full professor. Since then, he has been actively engaged in teaching both within and outside the university, alongside his prolific contributions to scholarly literature through over eighty articles and twelve books.

His son, Prof. Ze'ev Safrai, is a historian in the Department for Israel Studies in Bar Ilan University. His daughter, Prof. Hanna Safrai, was a researcher in the field of Chazal literature and a religious feminist activist.

In 1993, Yad Ben Zvi published a volume of studies in honor of Shmuel Safrai, titled Jews and Judaism in the Second Temple, Mishna and Talmud Period. Edited by Isaiah Gafni, Menachem Stern, and Aharon Oppenheimer, the book features contributions from prominent scholars, including David Flusser, Alon Goshen-Gottstein, Daniel Sperber, Uriel Rappaport and others.

== Awards ==
In 1986, Safrai received the Jerusalem Prize.

In 2002, he was awarded the Israel Prize for Land of Israel studies.

== See also ==
- List of Israel Prize recipients
