= Marwahin =

Marwahin مروحين
- Municipality
- Location within Lebanon
- Coordinates: 33°06′31″N 35°16′32″E
- Grid position: 176/279 PAL
- Country: Lebanon
- Governorate: South Governorate
- District: Tyre
- Elevation: 2,170 ft (660 m)
- Time zone: GMT +3

Marwahin (Arabic: مروحين, romanized: Marwāḥīn) is a municipality in Lebanon, on its border with Israel.

== Etymology ==
According to E. H. Palmer, the name comes either from: [..] "a place where the wind blows, effacing the traces of dwellings,' or from [..] "a fan".

== History ==
In 1875, Victor Guérin found here many ruins, with some Bedouin camping among the ruins.

In 1881, the PEF's Survey of Western Palestine (SWP) found here: "Traces of ruins, one tomb with fourteen loculi, three cisterns, and one olive-press."

=== Modern era ===
On 31 March 1993 an Israeli tank was destroyed and its crew killed in an ambush near Marwahin. The DFLP claimed responsibility for the attack. Two weeks later, 13 April, a further three Israeli soldiers were killed in the security zone.

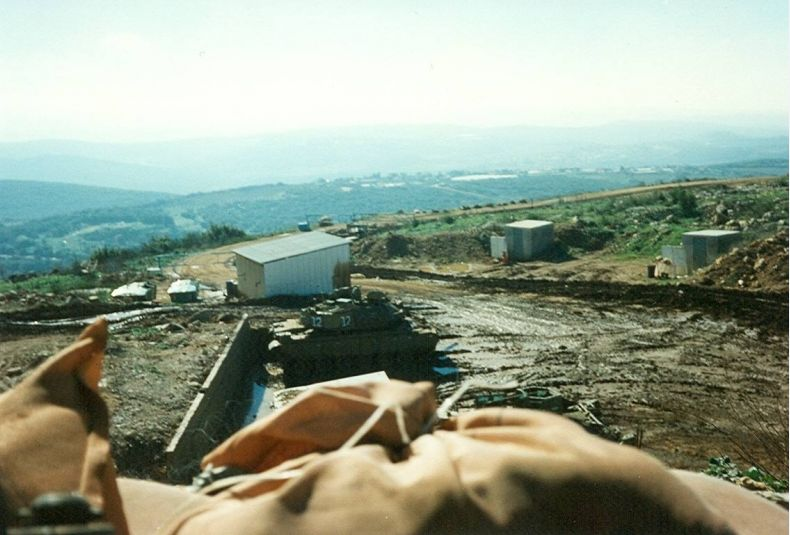
The Israeli military outpost of Karkom, in occupied South Lebanon, in 1998

During the 2006 Lebanon War, Marwahin was the site of ground exchanges between Israel and Hezbollah, which ended with a massacre of civilians. According to Human Rights Watch, the villagers of Marwahin reported that there had been some Hezbollah fighters and weapons in their village.

Lebanese civilian refugees from the town were first ordered by Israeli forces to flee the area, and given two hours to do so. They were then slaughtered in a convoy hit by an Israeli helicopter crew when they proceeded to obey the order to evacuate. Only two persons survived the massacre, by pretending to be dead. According to Human Rights Watch, no weapons were found in the vehicles destroyed by the Israeli attacks and personnel who tried to recover the victims' bodies were attacked. Human Rights Watch cited it as one of nine cases where they had ascertained that Israeli warplanes targeted civilian vehicles on roads during the 2006 hostilities. It stated that 23 civilians from this one village were killed by the Israeli strike, including 14 children and 7 women. The study reveals that the prime cause for the high Lebanese civilian death toll was Israel's repeated failure to abide by a fundamental obligation of war rules.

On October 8, 2024, during a ground operation in the area, the Israeli military announced the dismantling of a Hezbollah tunnel that extended approximately 25 meters into Israeli territory from the area of Marwahin.

== Demographics ==
In 2014 Muslims made up 99.67% of registered voters in Marwahin. 95.67% of the voters were Sunni Muslims. Before the start of the most recent Israel-Hezbollah War (in 2023), the town had between 3,000 and 4,000 residents, all of whom were displaced by the conflict.

== See also ==
- Belat temple

== Bibliography ==
- Conder, C.R.; Kitchener, H.H. (1881). The Survey of Western Palestine: Memoirs of the Topography, Orography, Hydrography, and Archaeology. Vol. 1. London: Committee of the Palestine Exploration Fund.
- Guérin, V. (1880). Description Géographique Historique et Archéologique de la Palestine (in French). Vol. 3: Galilee, pt. 2. Paris: L'Imprimerie Nationale.
- Palmer, E.H. (1881). The Survey of Western Palestine: Arabic and English Name Lists Collected During the Survey by Lieutenants Conder and Kitchener, R. E. Transliterated and Explained by E.H. Palmer. Committee of the Palestine Exploration Fund.
