= Hebrew and Aramaic papyri =

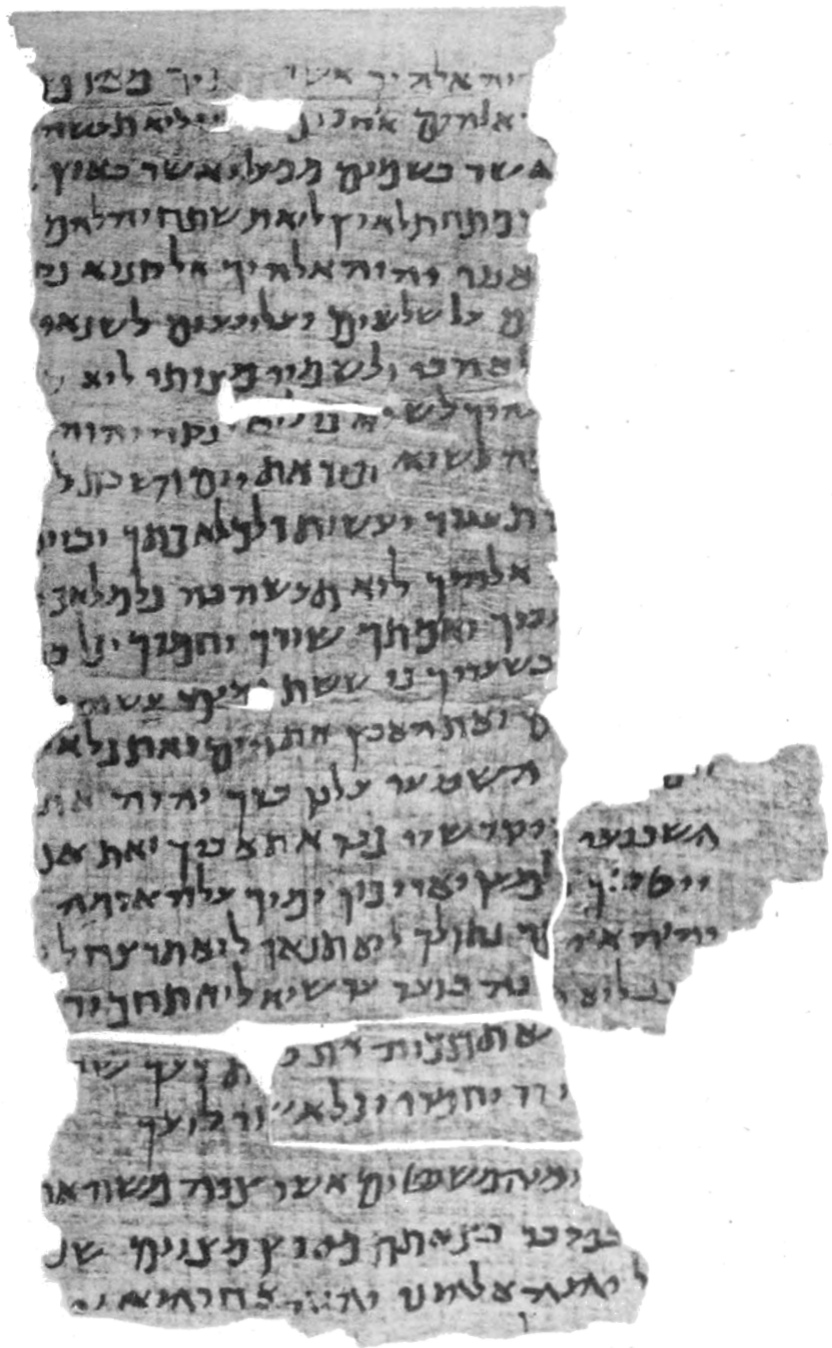
The four Nash Papyrus fragments in Hebrew, 2nd century

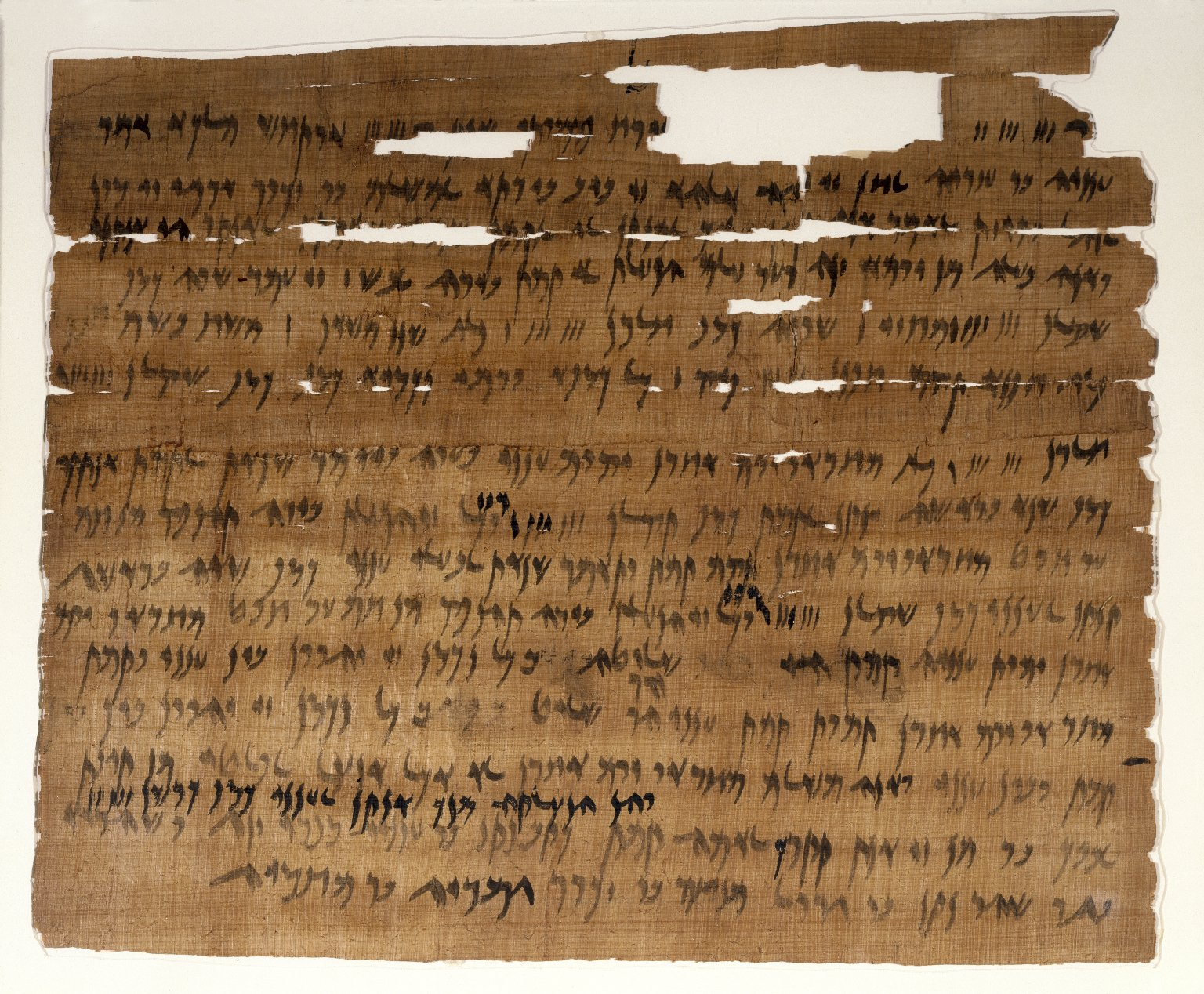
Aramaic marriage document, July 3, 449 BCE

Hebrew and Aramaic papyri have increasingly been discovered from the 1960s onwards, although these papyri remain rare compared to papyri written in Koine Greek and Demotic Egyptian (no relation except in name, "popular," to modern demotic Greek). The most valuable and religious texts were written on leather scrolls, parchment - such as the literary texts from Masada and Qumran, while papyrus was employed for cheaper, domestic use.

A standard work is the Corpus Papyrorum Judaicarum of Victor Tcherikover and Alexander Fuks (Cambridge, Massachusetts Vol.I 1957, II 1960, III ed. Menahem Stern 1964, IV ed. Noah Hacham 2020, V ed. Noah Hacham 2020) which is largely of Greek language papyri but includes examples of Hebrew and Aramaic papyri from Israel, Jordan, and Egypt.

== In Egypt ==
In 1909 Joseph Offord remarks that Germany had acquired all the Hebrew papyri found in Upper Egypt the previous winter, but that many were still to be found. In 1966 the Bodleian Library possessed only four Hebrew and three Aramaic papyri.

== Qumran ==
The main corpus, in terms of volume and significance, are the finds at Qumran (1948 onwards). Very few Biblical papyri (as opposed to scrolls) were found at Qumran.

== Aside from Qumran ==
In January 1952 Gerald Lankester Harding and Roland de Vaux commenced excavations in four caves at Wadi Murabba'at. 173 documents were found. 1 Aramaic and 1 Greek papyri only were found at the Wadi Sdeir.

In 1960-1961 Yigael Yadin excavated Greek, Hebrew and Aramaic papyri from the "Cave of Letters" at Nahal Hever (classified by "XHev" manuscript numbers) among which there were 15 letters; 10 in Hebrew, 3 in Aramaic and 2 in Greek.

In 1962 further finds of 18 Aramaic papyri from Samaria were made in the Wadi Daliyeh.

The 4 papyri from Nahal Se'elim (Wadi Seiyal) are in Greek.

== See also ==
- Ancient Hebrew writings
- Canaanite and Aramaic inscriptions
- List of Hebrew Bible manuscripts
