= Belat temple =

Ancient temple ruins in Lebanon

- معبد بلاط (Arabic)
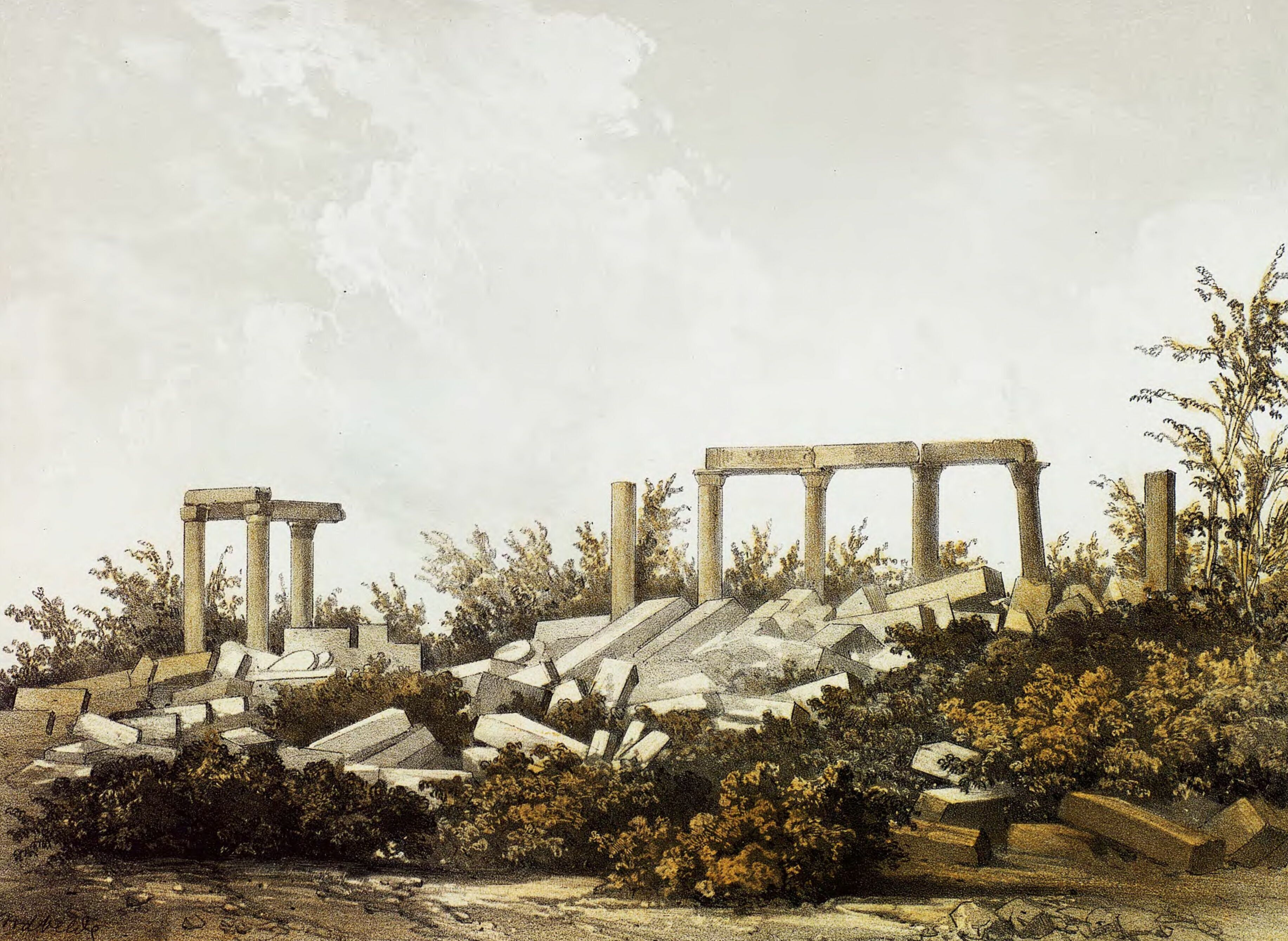
- 1857 sketch of Belat temple

- Location within Lebanon Location within Near East
- 33°06′53″N 35°17′26″E
- Location: Near Ramyah, Bint Jbeil District, Lebanon

History
- Built: unknown, perhaps 300–100 BCE

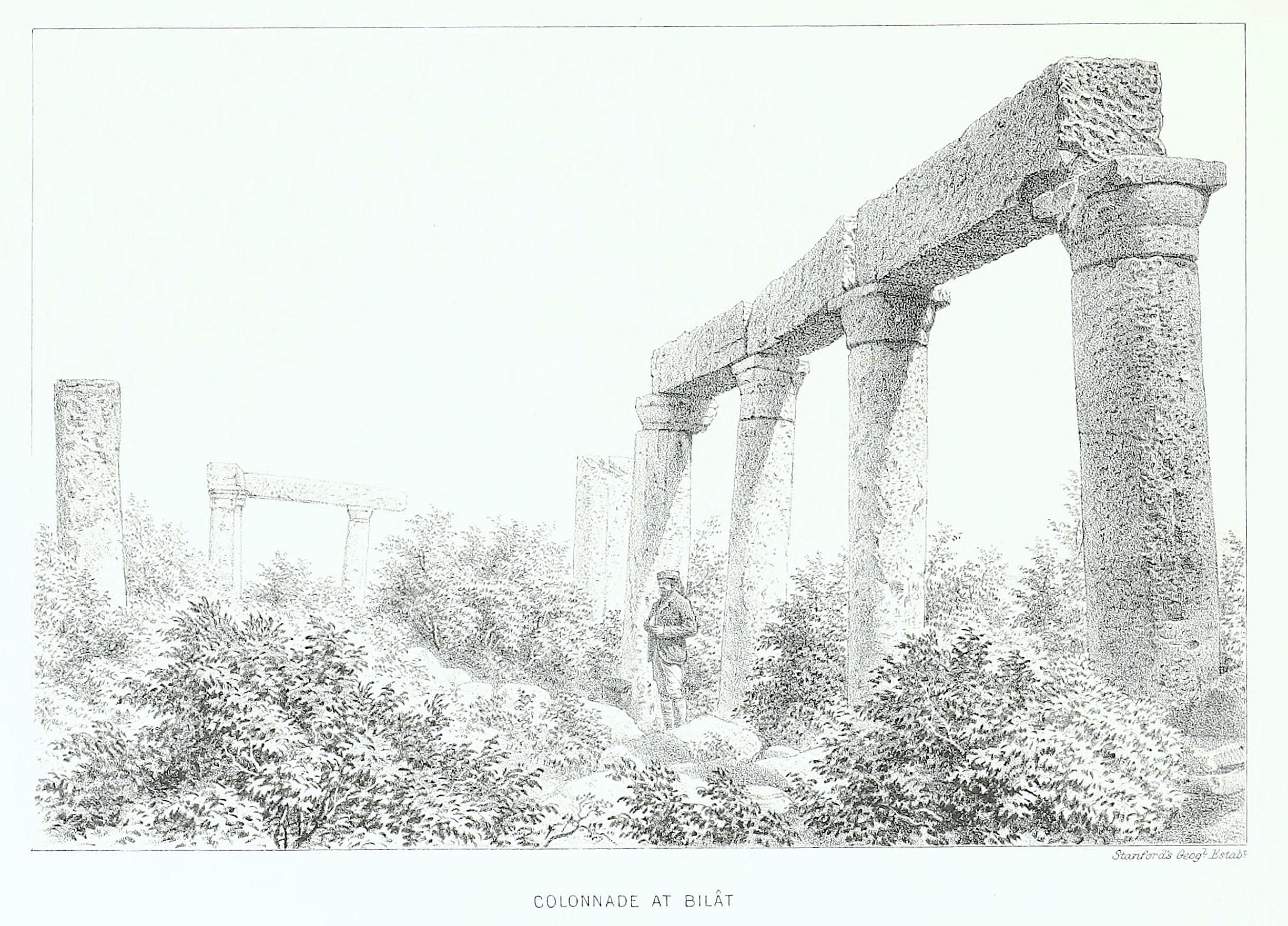
Belat Temple in the 1880s

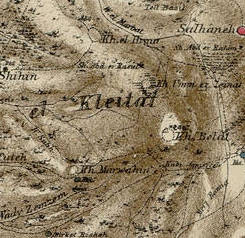
Location of the temple in an 1880 map

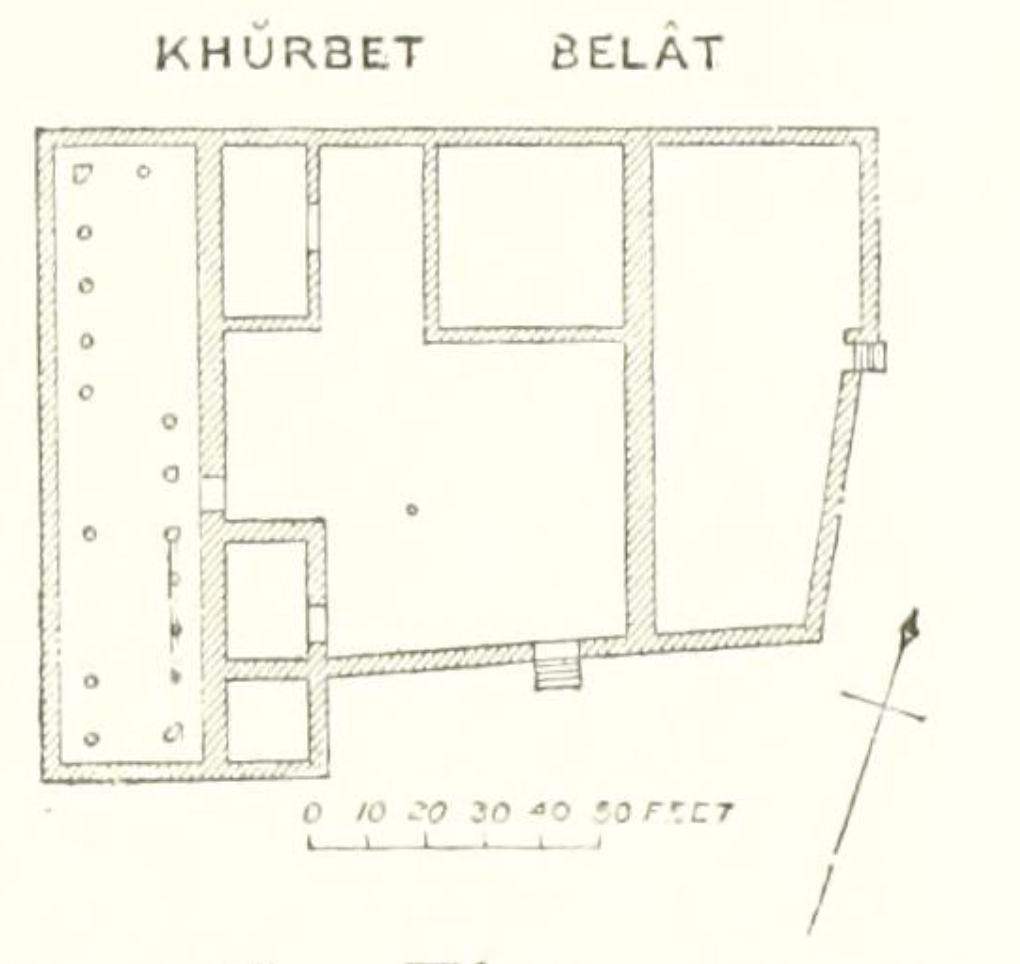
Belat temple diagram

Belat is a ruined temple of unknown identification in southern Lebanon, between Marwahin and Ramyah. H. H. Kitchener described its location as "on top of a very commanding, steep, and narrow ridge, difficult of access... in this, the wildest part of the country".

Kitchener and Ernest Renan considered it perhaps the finest example of a "high place" in the Galilee.

== Description ==
Descriptions of the temple in the mid-19th century describe the remains of 16 columns, with 10 still standing in 1852, of which four on the east and three on the northwest still held architraves with Doric-style capitals. In 1858 when Van de Velde visited, only nine of the columns were still standing. In 1877 when H. H. Kitchener visited, only six columns still bore an architrave.

The temple measured approximately 27.5m by 7m (90 ft x 22 ft, with the supporting platform extending 2 m (7 ft) beyond the row of columns. The columns are approximately 4 m (12 ft) high and 30 cm (1 ft) in diameter, standing 2m (7 feet) apart. Including the architrave the total height was 4.5m (14 1/2 ft). It was built from the common limestone of the region.

== Interpretations ==
In his 1852 travels to the region, Edward Robinson wrote:

The whole area is now full of fallen columns, architraves, and the like; but there does not appear to have been any interior building or fane. The stones are exceedingly worn by the weather, and there is the appearance of great rudeness in architecture. No sculpture is to be found except the columns; nor any trace of inscriptions. There is a cistern roughly hewn, in which we found water. Some traces of a small village are seen nearby; and a few hewn stones. We saw also a single sarcophagus sunk in a rock, with a rudely formed lid. This is a singular ruin, and hard to be accounted for. It has no resemblance to the heathen temples in Lebanon and Anti-Lebanon...

Ernest Renan wrote in his Mission de Phénicie

The height of Bélat possesses the most striking ruin in the whole country... All the stones, or nearly all, are scattered about the hill, and one could almost rebuild the temple. This picturesque mass of ruins... ought to be thoroughly examined... Bélat was very probably dedicated to the Magna Dea Calestis, or Venus (Βλάττα ὄνομα ̓Αφροδίτης κατὰ τοὺς φοίνικας, Lydus de Mens. § 24), or at least to some goddess... I am inclined to believe that these buildings belong to the Ptolemaic or Seleucide period. The Roman period would have produced something more correct. However that may be, Bélat is the finest example of a "high place" that the country has to show.

They were described by H. H. Kitchener in 1877 as "The most extraordinary ruins of this neighbourhood". He compared it to the columns at the Kfar Bar'am synagogue and to those at the Cathedral at Tyre. He described it as "one of the most perfect and earliest specimens of a temple dedicated to some deity worshipped on this "high place," and attended by a number of priests or votaries who were lodged in the surrounding buildings."

E. W. G. Masterman concluded that it was a pagan temple, which pre-dated and may have influenced the architecture of the later Jewish synagogues in the Galilee.

W. F. Albright proposed in 1921 that Belat might be biblical Beth-Anath, but later changed his mind, locating Beth-Anath at Bi'ina (Dayr al Ba'ana).

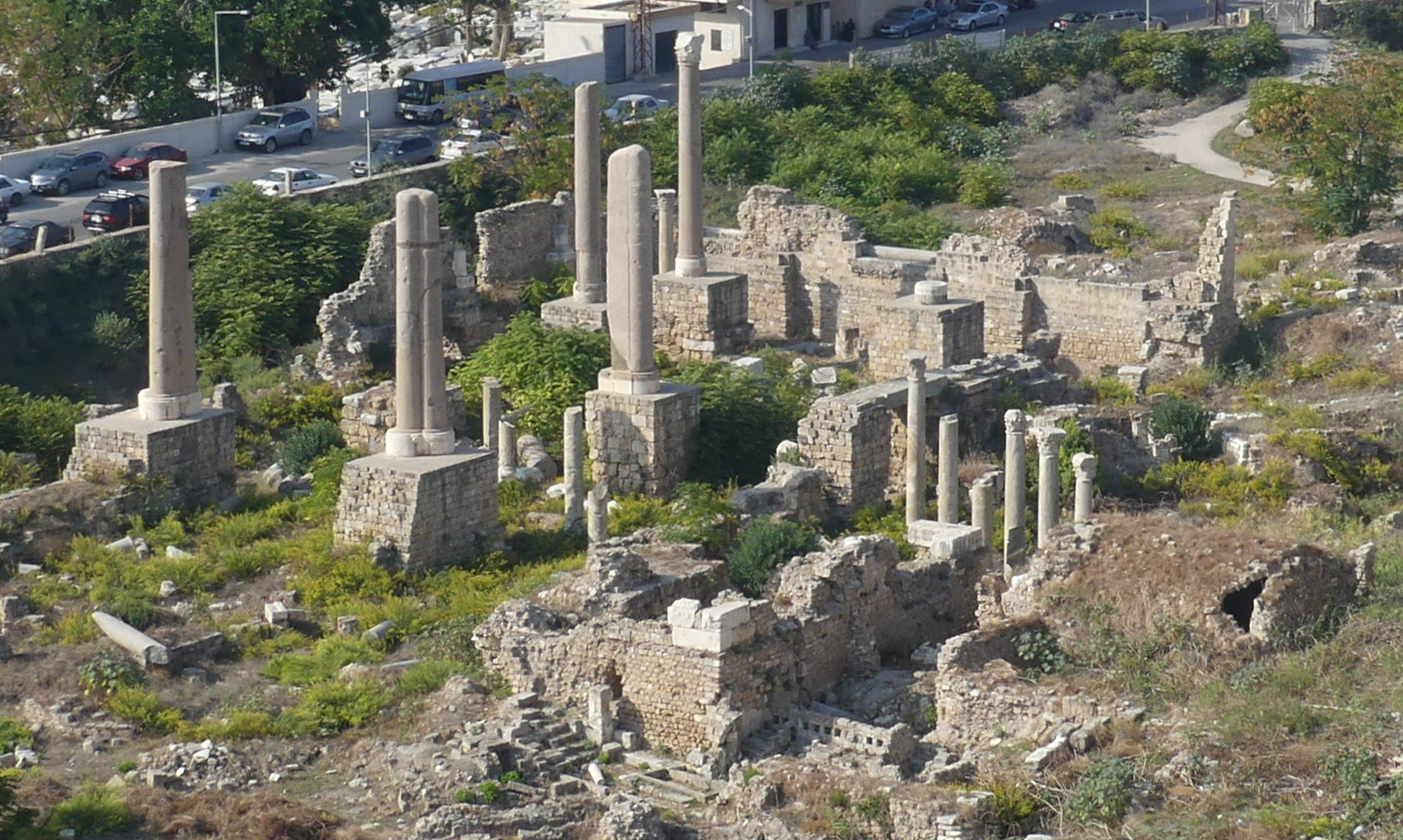
Cathedral of Tyre

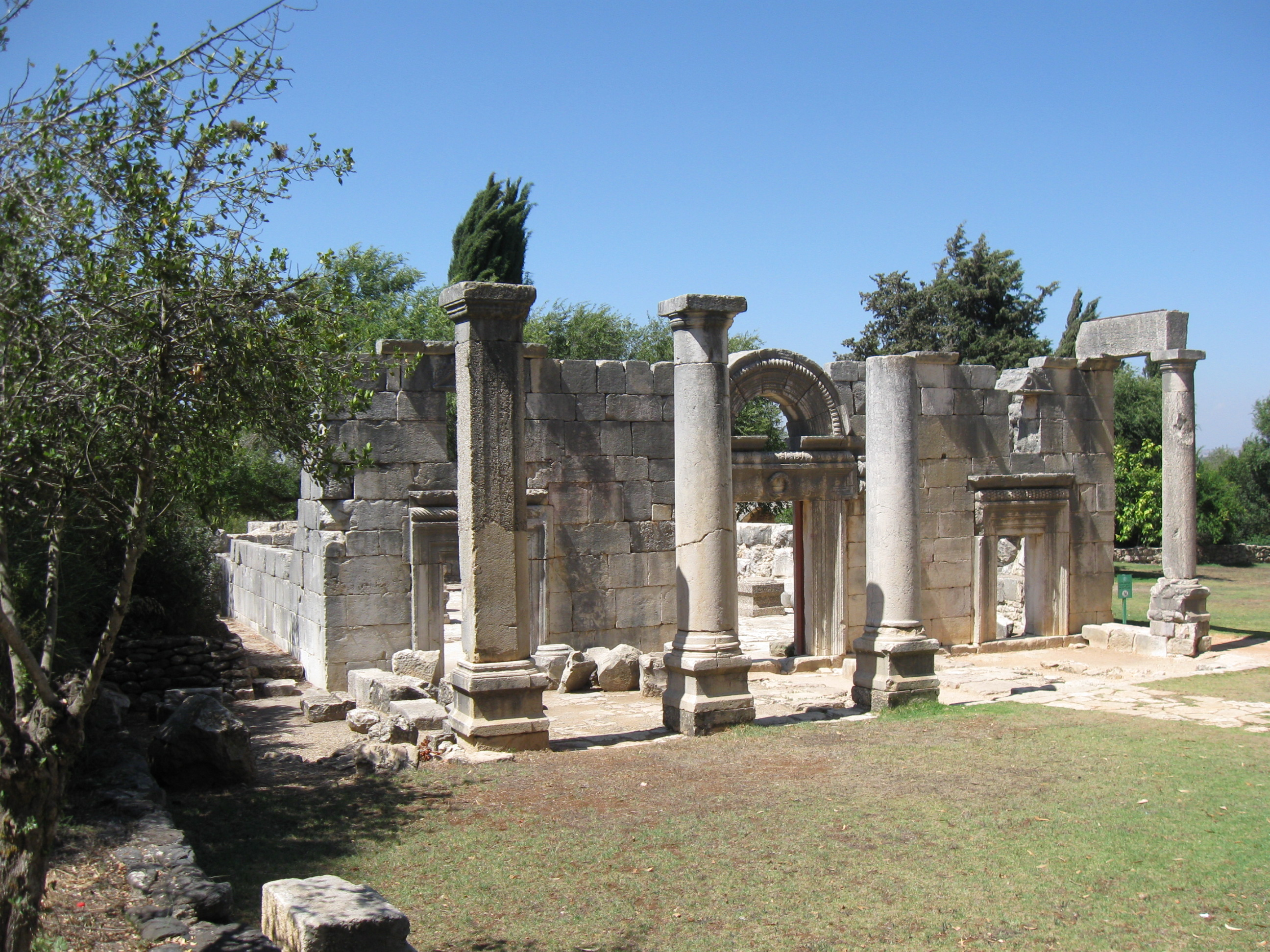
Bar'am synagogue

Similar columns in the wider area
