= Chana Safrai =

- חנה ספראי
- Born: 1946
- Died: February 10, 2008
- Burial place: Har HaMenuchot

Chana Safrai (Hebrew: חנה ספראי 1946 – February 10, 2008) was an Israeli scholar, educator, and notable figure in Jewish feminist theology. Safrai was raised in an Orthodox Jerusalem household and later earned advanced degrees in Jewish studies, which shaped her focus on women's representation in rabbinic literature. She specialized in Midrash and rabbinic literature, applying feminist interpretive approaches to traditional Jewish texts. Safrai taught for many years at Jerusalem's Shalom Hartman Institute, where she was involved in developing instructional methods that emphasized women's participation in advanced textual learning.

Safrai is noted for her contributions to feminist readings of rabbinic sources and for promoting egalitarian educational methods in Jewish learning in Israel. Her scholarship combined academic research and community-based teaching, influencing how sacred texts were taught in both religious and secular contexts. Colleagues at the Hartman Institute, including scholar Avital Hochstein, described Safrai as someone who “lived her theology,” emphasizing her integration of scholarly analysis and spiritual commitment. Her research increased the presence and visibility of women's voices in Jewish textual traditions, challenging assumptions about who is qualified to interpret and teach classical Jewish sources, making way for women's interpretive authority. As a result, Safrai encouraged new educators to assert their voices within the tradition.

== Early life and education ==
Chana Safrai was born in 1946 in Jerusalem, where she grew up in a religious Orthodox Jewish family. She lived in the Haredi neighborhood of Etz-Hayyim where she studied at the Horeb School, an institution focused on Rabbi Samson Raphael Hirsch's doctrine of Torah im Derech Eretz. This school of thought encourages modern perspectives and practices of Orthodoxy, which may have contributed to her exploration of feminist themes in Judaism later in life. Her father, Shmuel Safrai who studied Talmud and Second Temple Judaism at the Hebrew University of Jerusalem, encouraged her to study Jewish learning when she was young.

She attended the Hebrew University of Jerusalem, where she earned a master's degree (M.A.) in Jewish studies. During her time at Hebrew University of Jerusalem, she studied Jewish history, philosophy, and rabbinic literature. She then went on to earn her Ph.D. in Judaic studies from the Catholic Theological University and completed her doctorate at the Utrecht University, Holland, where she taught for several years. During her graduate studies, she became interested in how women are represented in traditional Jewish literature, which then sparked her interest in her research and teaching later in life.

== Career ==
Safrai earned her doctoral degree at the Catholic Theological University. Her thesis titled "Women in the Temple in Jerusalem" examined how women appeared in Temple-related halakhic and rabbinic sources and what roles they had in religious life. She contributed to feminist scholarship in Jewish learning through her work with the Ne'emanei Torah Va'Avodah organization. There, she wrote commentaries interpreting halakhic and midrashic texts in rabbinic style, while highlighting women's roles and creating space for women's scholarly voices. After studying classics, Jewish history, and Jewish philosophy at the Hebrew University of Jerusalem, Safrai taught there for several years while she completed her doctorate. She helped start the Judith Lieberman Institute for the Study of Talmud, the first school where women could focus on studying Talmud. She also worked as Acting Principal of Pelech, a religious high school for girls in Jerusalem where she contributed to the education of many young women. Throughout her career, Safrai also advanced Jewish-Christian interfaith relations, particularly while lecturing across universities in Europe.

Safrai contributed to numerous books in Jewish and feminist spaces including editing David Flusser's book Judaism and Christianity and co-editing alongside Micah D. Halpern, the volume Jewish Legal Writings by Women (1988). She also continued her academic collaborations with her family, joining her father, Shmuel Safrai, and brother, Ze'ev Safrai to prepare a scientific commentary on the Mishnah.

The last book she wrote, Women Out Women In: The Place of Women in Midrash (2008), was written with her student Avital Hochstein on women in Halachik midrash. The book explores how female figures appear in rabbinic writings covering legal, social, and religious roles, with a focus on halakhic midrash (halakhic midrash refers to rabbinic texts that interpret Jewish legal tradition), an area rarely examined through a feminist lens. Safrai and Hochstein's Women Out, Women In, highlights women's roles in halakhic midrash, emphasizing their presence and potential authority in texts where they are often overlooked, challenging assumptions that women were absent or insignificant. The book applies a feminist lens to examine legal, social, and religious aspects of women's participation in rabbinic writings, combining Safrai's interests in women's studies and rabbinic law.

She worked with Hochstein in a havruta-style way (a traditional paired study method), which entailed a mutual learning style that involved sharing knowledge, mentoring through collaboration, and teamwork rather than authority. Their studies found that although women are sometimes mentioned in halakhic texts, their presence is generally limited and narrowly defined. References to women typically occur in spiritual or legal contexts rather than in descriptions of everyday life, and they are not portrayed in detail for many rituals in the same way men are. Safrai's research was among the first to examine in detail the limited presence of women in halakhic texts. Through her work, Safrai demonstrated that women can appear in legal midrashic discussions that address issues such as marriage, property, ritual obligations, and participation in communal life, areas where classical sources acknowledge women's halakhic status even as they restrict their practical roles. Her scholarship emphasized that while halakhic literature assigns women specific legal standing, such as rights in matters of marriage contracts, inheritance, and ritual purity laws, these frameworks existed alongside broader social norms that limited women's authority and public religious participation.

Safrai played a role in setting up learning spaces where women could study Talmud and midrash, pushing for inclusion in Jewish education and study even if it was a slow change. Safrai's research in how women appear in legal midrash, revealed how old texts also talk about women's roles in law, community, and religion.

== Historical context ==
During Chana Safrai's lifetime feminism was not accepted by many in traditional Jewish circles. Although Safrai was raised in an Orthodox Jewish family and community, she joined a handful of women diving into Talmud study and the study of other religious texts. Safrai and these other female scholars, helped more women gain religious learning opportunities.

Beginning in the 1970s and 1980s, women's Torah study in Israel gradually expanded, influenced by larger global feminist movements and the emergence of institutions experimenting with new religious education models. During these decades, there were heated debates within Israeli Orthodoxy about women's participation in public religious life, rabbinic scholarship, and halakhic interpretation. Safrai's work emerged at a time when women were only beginning to gain access to yeshiva level education, and her involvement in the establishment of institutions such as the Judith Lieberman Institute reflected a broader shift toward creating formal frameworks for women's advanced studies. Her scholarship also addressed current debates in Israeli society about gender, law, and the role of tradition during a time of significant cultural and religious change.

== Legacy ==
Chana Safrai died on February 10, 2008, not long after her final book was released.

Chana Safrai's scholarly and institutional work influenced modern Jewish education and ideas. Her legacy is also kept alive through Avital Hochstein, Safrai's student, through her many writings. After they met in a seminar, they immediately began having regular meetings together analyzing texts and writing together. In the book they wrote together, Women Out Women In: The Place of Women in Midrash, Hochstein explains how her work examining the Midrash with a feminist perspective was influenced by Safrai.

Hochstein noted that Safrai never used her abundance of knowledge to insinuate greater authority or take a stance above her student. Rather, they learned and analyzed texts on an equal level with the intention of genuinely building an understanding for not only the Midrash, but also each other's perspectives.
