= Victor Tcherikover =

Russian-Israeli scholar

- אביגדור צ'ריקובר
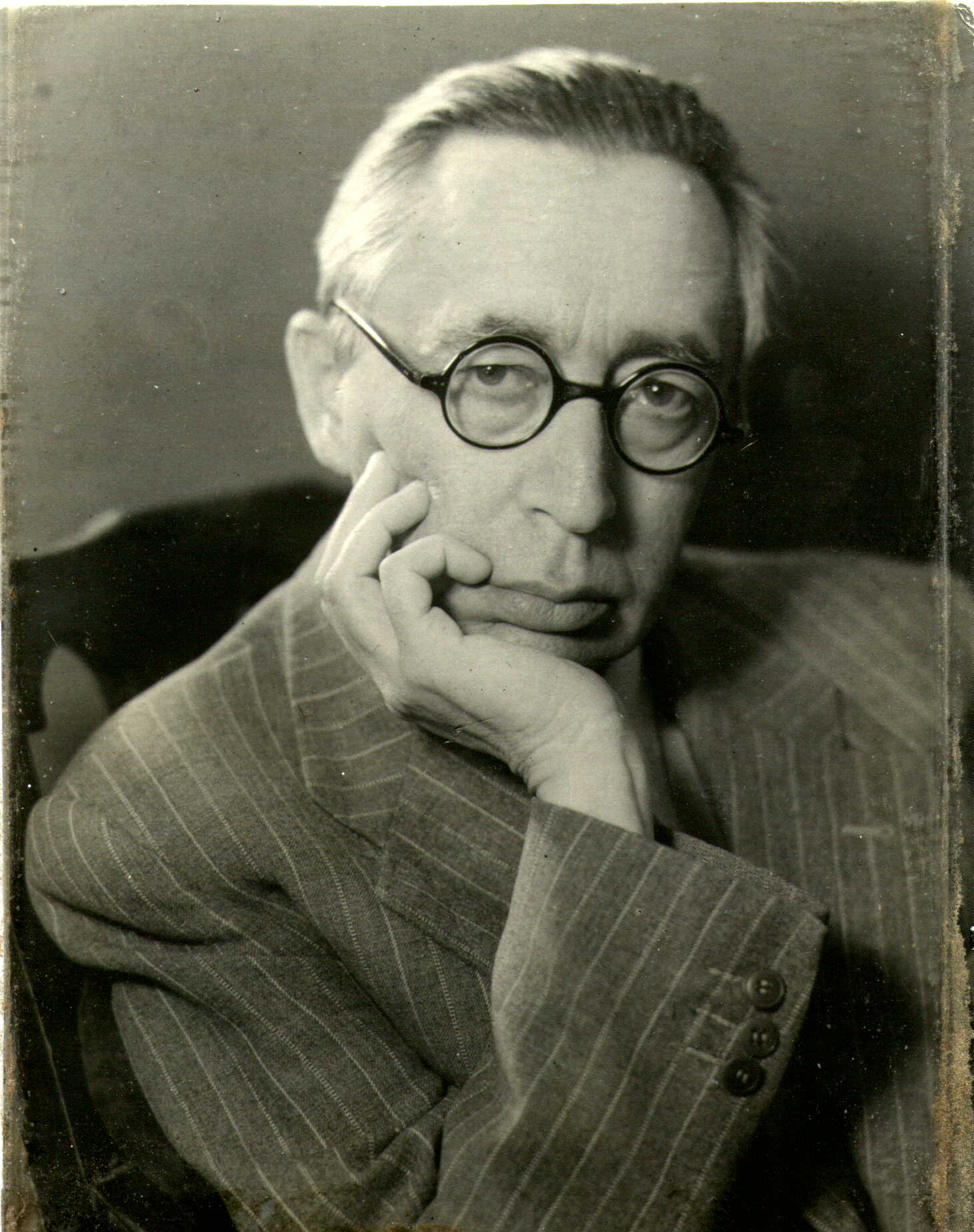
- Born: September 15, 1894; Saint Petersburg, Russian Empire
- Died: January 16, 1958 (aged 63); Jerusalem, Israel
- Burial place: Har HaMenuchot
- Employer: Hebrew University of Jerusalem

Academic background
- Education: Moscow State University; Humboldt University of Berlin

Victor Tcherikover (Hebrew name: אביגדור צ'ריקובר, romanized: Avigdor Tcherikover; 15 September 1894 – 16 January 1958) was a Russian-born Israeli scholar.

== Biography ==
Born in Russia, he settled in Palestine in 1925. He was one of the first teachers at the Hebrew University of Jerusalem and headed the departments of general history and classical studies. He specialized in Jewish history in Palestine and Egypt during the Graeco-Roman period.

== Publications ==
- Ha-Yehudim veha-Yevanim ba-tekufah ha-Helenistit. 1930.
- Hellenistic Civilization and the Jews. 1959. {Review by Moses Hadas}
- Corpus Papyrorum Judaicarum. Vol. 1–2 with Alexander Fuks (1957–1960). Tcherikover was succeeded for the third volume (1963) by Menahem Stern.

== Quotes ==
“The inner quality of anti-Semitism,” he writes, “arises from the very existence of the Jewish people as an alien body among the nations. The alien character of the Jews is the central cause of the origin of anti-Semitism.”
