= Ze'ev Safrai =

Israeli historian

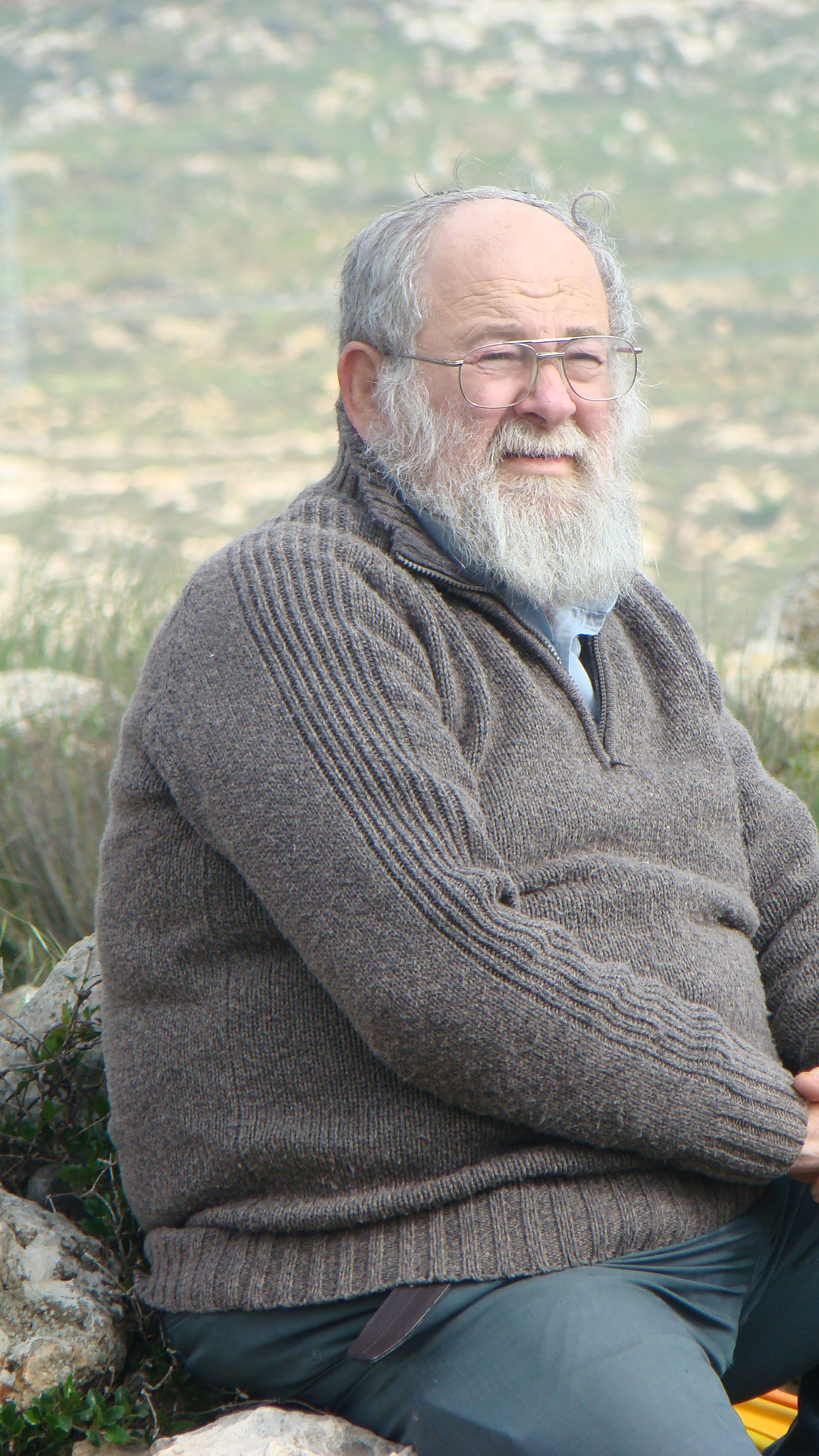

Ze'ev Safrai (Hebrew: זאב ספראי; born 1948, Jerusalem) is an Israeli professor in the Department for Israel Studies in Bar Ilan University, as well as an author, lecturer and researcher of Israel in the Second Temple era. His main project is his authorship of the socio-historical commentary to the Mishnah called Mishnat Eretz Yisrael (literally "the Mishnah of the land of Israel"), which he began together with his father Shmuel Safrai and his sister Chana Safrai.

Since the Mishnah is a code of law, its textual style is very concise and lacking in socio-historical background. While some scholarly attempts have been made to understand the meaning of the Mishnah and some attempts have been made to sketch the biographies of the authorities the Mishnah mentions (by referring to talmudic and midrashic sources, for example) Mishnat Eretz Yisrael is the only complete commentary to the Mishnah that uses socio-historical evidence of the time to provide context for the Mishnah's laws.

Of the expected 45 volumes, 22 have been completed.

== Biography ==
Born in Jerusalem in 1948, he studied in Yeshivat Netiv Meir, volunteered for the Bnei Akiva religious (Jewish) youth movement, served in the Israel Defense Forces, and then became a founding member of Kibbutz Ma'ale Gilboa. He received his doctorate from the Hebrew University on the subject of "Historical Geography of the land of Samaria" under Menachem Stern and Zakariah Klai.

He married Dina from Kibbutz Yavneh in 1974 and settled there. She manages sales of the Mishnat Eretz Yisrael commentary.

=== Positions ===
At Bar Ilan University, he has been head of the Department for Israel Studies and Deputy Rector of the University. He was on the secretariats of the Trustees of Torah and Avodah (a religious movement), the Mafdal and on the permits committee of the Israel Archaeology Council. He served as head of the committee for the training of Tour Guides in the Israel Tourism Office. Currently he is a member of Israel Place Naming Committee, a member on the managerial committee of Ashkelon College, the Achvah Academic College, Givat Washington College and Yaakov Herzog Centre.

=== Research ===
Safrai describes himself as a 'servant' of the Mishnaic and Talmudic period. He works on all perspectives of the period, especially those areas where a combination of source types and methodological approaches are required, for instance the combination of the Sages' source and archaeological finds, or the Sages' sources and a socio-historical approach.

== Awards ==
- 1995 - Yad Ben-Zvi Peace prize for his book The Economy of Roman Palestine
- 2000 - Israel Education Minister's award for new Torah works for his project Mishnat Eretz Yisrael.

== Books ==
Full list of books and publications on CV.

=== English books written ===
- The MacMillan Bible Atlas - Completely revised (with A. Rainey), New York 1993.
- The Economy of Roman Palestine, Routledge London 1994.
- The Missing Century, Leuvein 1998./
- The Onomasticon of Eusabius, (with S. Notley) Leiden 2005.
- The Haggada of the Sages (with S.Safrai), Jerusalem
- Seeking the Holy Land, Amsterdam

=== Hebrew books ===
- Mishnat Eretz Yisrael: Series to include approximately 45 volumes, of which 35 have are published
- Israel in the Second Temple Era (together with Eyal Regev, published by Carta) 2011.
- The Book of Proverbs according to the sages, together with R. Notley. Published by Carta, 2011.
- Passover Haggadah - Hagadah of the sages (together with S. Safrai), 2008. English version was translated by Rabbi Professor Tabori
- הקהילה היהודית בארץ-ישראל בתקופת המשנה והתלמוד, ירושלים : מרכז זלמן שזר לתולדות ישראל, תשנ"ה. ISBN 9652270962
- היישוב היהודי בגולן, קשת, תשל"ח.
- פרקי גליל בתקופת המשנה והתלמוד, מעלות תשמ"א. מהדורה שניה מורחבת ירושלים תשמ"ה.
- גבולות ושלטון בארץ ישראל בתקופת המשנה והתלמוד, תל אביב תש"ם.
- אום ריחן, עיירה מתקופת המשנה (בשיתוף עם ש' דר וי' טפר) תל אביב תשמ"ו.
- חציבה ומחצבות אבן בארץ-ישראל (בשיתוף א' ששון), ירושלים תשס"א.

=== English books edited ===
- The Rural Landscape of Ancient Israel, (with, E. Meir and S. Dar and Z' Safrai, eds), Oxford 2003.
- The Literature of the Sages The Jewish People in the First Century, Compendia Rerum Judaicarum II, – S. Safrai, Z. Safrai, J. Schwartz, P.J. Thomson, Amsterdam 2006.
- The Jewish People in the First Century Compendia Rerum Judaicarum II, Amsterdam 2006.

=== Hebrew books edited ===
- בית הכנסת בארץ ישראל בתקופת המשנה והתלמוד, ירושלים תשמ"ו.
- מחקרי שומרון, ז' ספראי וש' דר עורכים, תל אביב תשמ"ו.
- חקרי ארץ, עיונים בתולדות ארץ-ישראל מוגשים לכבוד פרופ' יהודה פליקס, ז', ספראי, א' פרידמן וי' שוורץ, עורכים, רמת-גן תשנ"ז
- הכפר הקדום בארץ-ישראל, תל אביב תשנ"ז, ז' ספראי וש' דר, עורכים.
- בין סמכות לאוטונומיה, ז' ספראי וא' שגיא, עורכים, תל אביב תשנ"ח.
- אשקלון עיר לחוף ימים, א' ששון, ז' ספראי, ונ' שגיב, עורכים, אשקלון תשס"א,

In addition he has published many articles in various journals in Hebrew, English, German and French.

== Articles ==
- קתדרה, זאב ספראי, בתי הכנסת של השומרונים בתקופה הרומית-ביזנטית, 4.12, 4, יולי 1977
- קתדרה,זאב ספראי,ה'אונומסטיקון' לאוסביוס והיישוב בדרום הר חברון, 72.11, 72, תמוז תשנ"ד, יוני 1994
- Ze’ev Safrai, “Gergesa, Gerasa, or Gadara? Where Did Jesus’ Miracle Occur?” Jerusalem Perspective 51 (1996): 16-19.
