= Israel Shatzman =

Israeli historian of Ancient Rome and Judaea

- ישראל שצמן
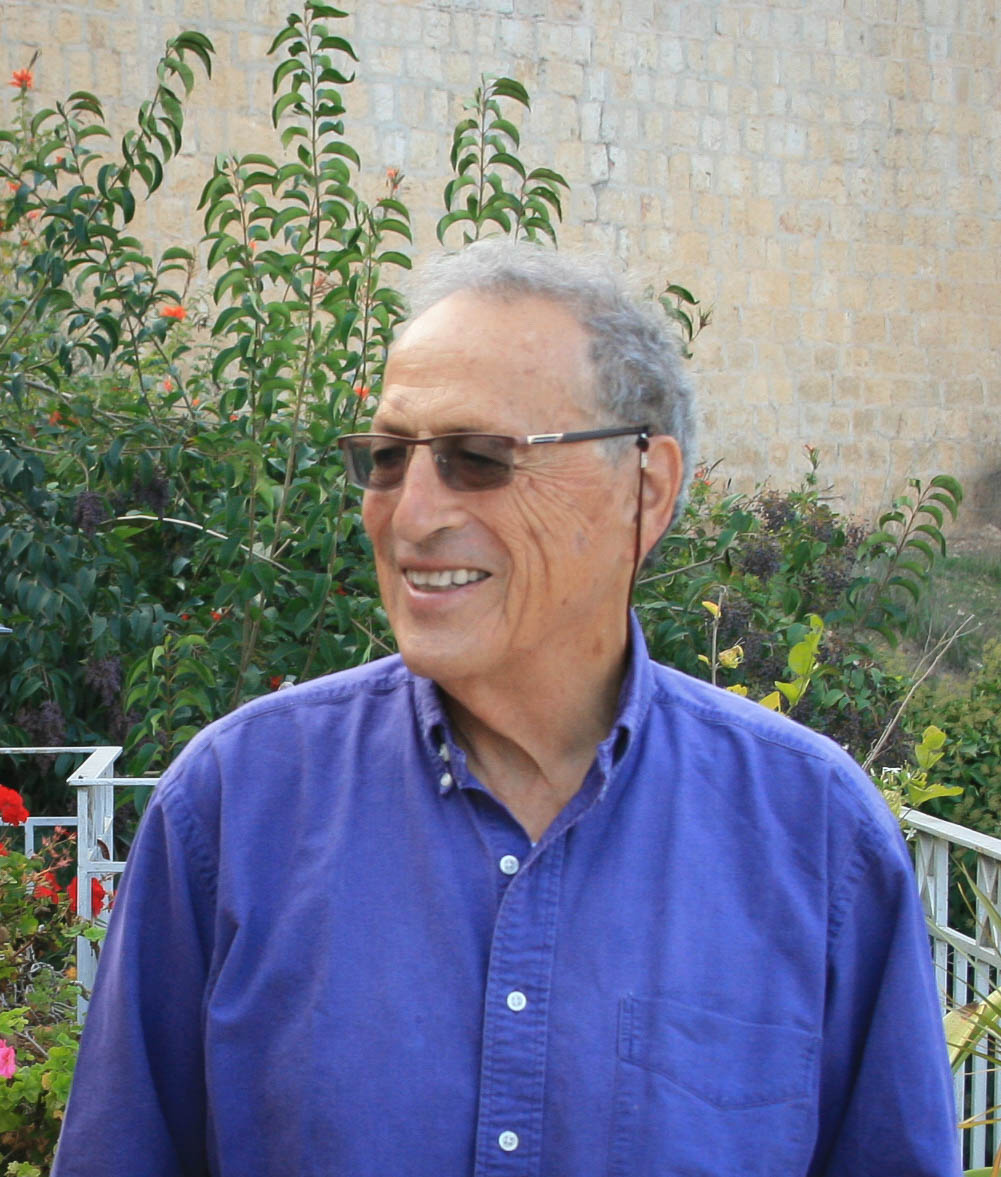
- Born: 25 November 1934; Binyaminah, Mandatory Palestine
- Died: 24 October 2017 (aged 82)
- Education: Hebrew University of Jerusalem
- Employer: Hebrew University of Jerusalem

Israel Shatzman (Hebrew: ישראל שצמן; 25 November 1934 – 24 October 2017) was an Israeli historian. He served as a Professor of History at the Hebrew University of Jerusalem starting in 1976. He has also been a Fellow at the Israel Institute for Advanced Studies, Vice President for Academic Affairs at the Open University of Israel (1979-1984), Director at the National Library of Israel (1990-1997), and served two two-year stints as President of the Israel Society for the Promotion of Classical Studies. He took emeritus status at Hebrew University in 2003.

Shatzman was a scholar of ancient Rome and has written extensively on the Roman military. He also has covered Judea in antiquity, both during the pre-Roman Hellenistic period and the rule of the Hasmonean kingdom, as well as the integration into the Roman empire as Roman Judea.

== Biography ==
Shatzman was born on 25 November 1934 in Binyaminah, then a part of Mandatory Palestine in the south Carmel region of northern Israel, near Haifa. The famous rabbi Solomon Schechter was an uncle of his mother. After his mandatory service in the Israeli army, he moved to Jerusalem in 1956 where he studied Ancient History at the Hebrew University. There, he studied under Alexander Fuks and Chaim Wirszubski, where he concentrated on both the Hellenistic period of Greek influence in the Eastern Mediterranean as well as the Roman era. During his post-doctorate, he spent two years at Cambridge University, where he worked with Peter Brunt and wrote his book Senatorial Wealth and Roman Politics, considered the authoritative work on the topic for the time.

He served as head of the department of history at the newly-established University of the Negev from 1970 to 1974. He returned to teach at the Hebrew University of Jerusalem in 1976, and acquired a full professorship in 1985. He served as an editor of the academic journal Scripta Classica Israelica for volumes 1-5 and 10, as well as two terms as president of the Israel Society for the Promotion of Classical Studies (which publishes Scripta Classica Israelica). He served as Director at the National Library of Israel from 1990 to 1997. That time period was after the end of the Cold War which eased communication and travel to Eastern Europe, and he took advantage of the opportunity to acquire and document various preserved Hebrew manuscripts from the former Eastern Bloc. He was a Fellow at the Israel Institute for Advanced Studies in 1995–1996. He took emeritus status at Hebrew University in 2003 and retired from teaching, but continued to publish research and articles. A festschrift was published in Shatzman's honor in 2009 for his 75th birthday.

Shatzman married his wife Tehiya in 1959, also from Binyaminah. He died on 24 October 2017 after a three-year struggle with illness. He was survived by his wife, three daughters, and three granddaughters.

== Selected works ==
English-language Books

- Shatzman, Israel (1975). Senatorial Wealth and Roman Politics. Brussels: Latomus.
- Shatzman, Israel (1991). The Armies of the Hasmonaeans and Herod: From Hellenistic to Roman Frameworks. Texts and Studies in Ancient Judaism 25. Tübingen: Mohr Siebeck. ISBN 3-16-145617-3.

Articles and chapters

- Shatzman, Israel (1972). "The Roman General's Authority over Booty". Historia. 21: 177–205.
- Shatzman, Israel (1999). "The Integration of Judaea into the Roman Empire". Scripta Classica Israelica. 18: 49–85. doi:10.71043/sci.v18i.4065. ISSN 0334-4509.
- Shatzman, Israel (2011). "The Roman Republic: From Monarchy to Julius Caesar". The Practice of Strategy: From Alexander the Great to the Present. Oxford University Press. doi:10.1093/acprof:oso/9780199608638.001.0001. ISBN 978-0-19-173175-4.

Festschrift

- Geiger, Joseph; Cotton, Hannah M.; Stiebel, Guy D., eds. (2009). Israel's Land: Papers Presented to Israel Shatzman on his Jubilee. Raanana: Open University of Israel, Israel Exploration Society. ISBN 978-965-06-1052-4.
