= Jacob Psantir =

Romanian Jewish musician and historical writer

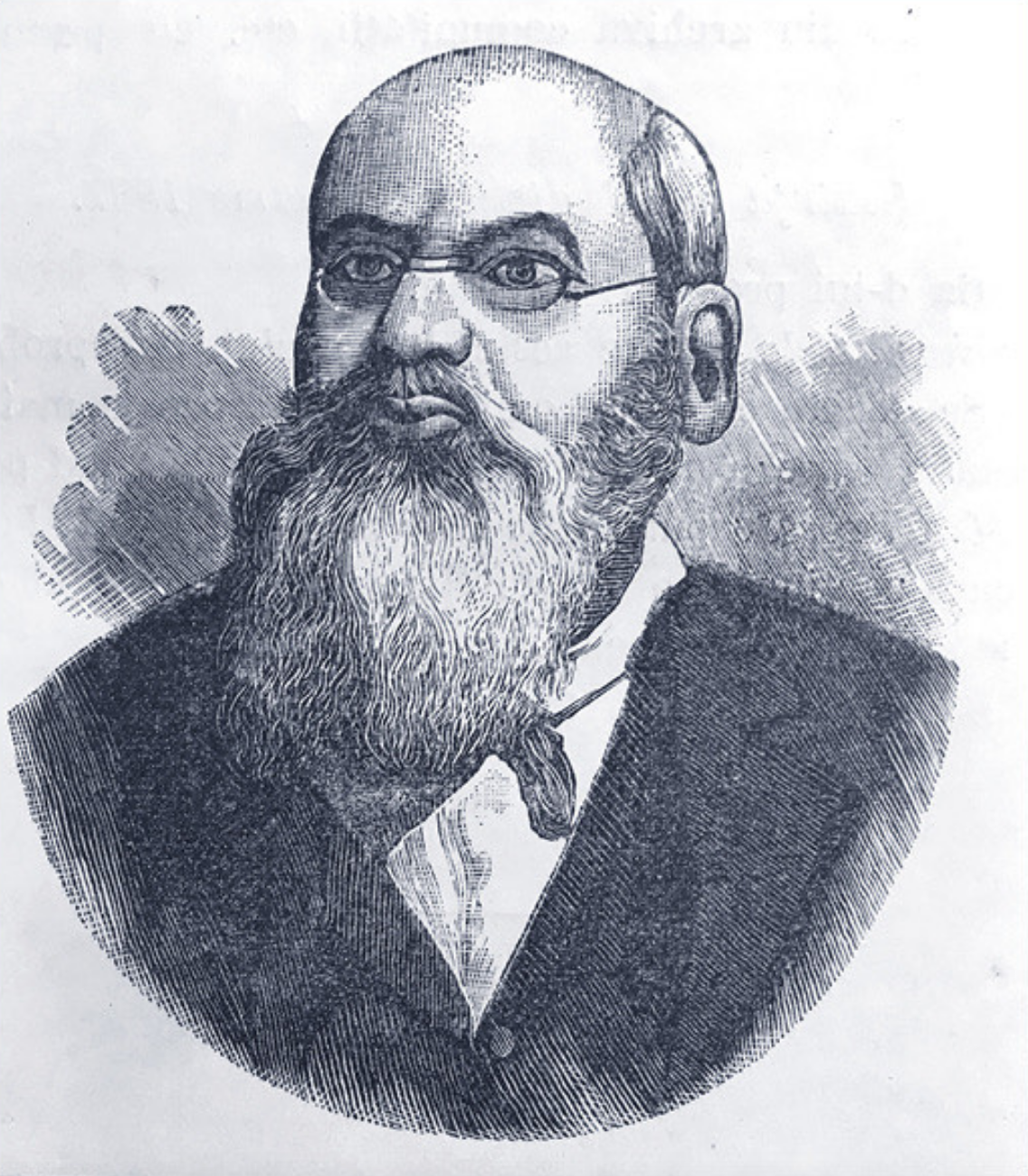
- Born: 6 June 1820; Botoșani, Moldavia
- Died: 22 March 1901 (aged 80); Bucharest, Romania

Jacob ben Asher Zelig Psantir (Hebrew: יעקב בן אשר זעליג פסנטיר, Romanian: Iacob Psantir; 6 June 1820 – 22 March 1901) was a Romanian Jewish musician and historical writer.

== Biography ==
Jacob Psantir came from a once-affluent Jewish Moldavian family. His father, known as "Zelig the Frenchman," worked as an interpreter for Scarlat Callimachi, and later for the French consulate in Iași.

Psantir was orphaned at age 11, and received little formal education. Still, from his childhood he devoted himself to the study of music. He became a klezmer at age 13, and joined a Romani orchestra as a Lăutar. Psantir founded in Fălticeni a band of traveling Jewish and Romani musicians, with whom he performed across the Romanian Principalities, Bulgaria, Turkey, Crimea, and Bessarabia.

During these years, he began to write a history of his family, but as he proceeded with it his ambition moved him to enlarge the scope of his work until it finally embraced the history of the Jews of Romania. For five years, though possessing very limited means, he traveled throughout Romania, visiting the cemeteries and studying the communal documents. The results of his labors were published in two works entitled Divre ha-Yamim la-Artzot Rumenye (Iași, 1871) and Korot ha-Yehudim be-Rumenye (Lemberg, 1873). In the former, Psantir claims the existence of a Jewish presence in Dacia from as early as the 6th century BC. A Romanian edition of both works was published at Bucharest in 1877.

In 1875, Psantir published a memoir, entitled Sefer Zikhroynes (1875). He was the author also of Ha-Savlanut ha-Datit be-Romania, on religious tolerance in Romania, and Ha-Kosem (Romanian: Fermecătorul), on popular magic.

== Bibliography ==
- Divre ha-yamim la-artzot Rumenye [Chronicles of the Lands of Romania] (in Yiddish). Iași: Defus Hersh Goldner. 1871.
- Korot ha-Yehudim be-Rumenye [History of the Jews in Romania] (in Yiddish). Lemberg. 1873.
- Sefer Zikhroynes [Memoirs] (in Yiddish). 1875.
- Mazkereth Zion (Andenken Zions. Ein Euszug aus den in polnischen Jargon schön gedrückten Werkehen: Chronik und Rumänische Judengeschichte) [Memory of Zion] (in German). Translated by Weitzenberg, Adolf Manuel. Bucharest: Buchdruckerei von Thiel & Weiss. 1877.
- Fermecătorul. Arătarea înşelătoriei ce Mi se pare au săvârşit fermecătorii şi ghicitorii de la început până în zilele noastre [The Charmer] (in Romanian). Craiova: Philip Lasăr. 1886. Introduction by Moses Gaster.
- Ha-Savlanut ha-Datit be-Romania (Unpublished).
