= Jewish Year Book =

The Jewish Year Book is an almanac targeted at the Jewish community in the United Kingdom. It was published every year from 1896 until 2015 and was last published by Vallentine Mitchell in association with The Jewish Chronicle and was edited by Stephen W. Massil.

It provides a directory and guide to Jewish institutions and religious, social, educational, cultural and welfare organisations in the British Isles. It also includes up to date lists of websites and a guide to worldwide Jewish organisations, and a list of Israel's embassies and missions. It gives an outline of Jewish history in Britain and covers UK laws which are relevant to Jews and their place in British society. It also includes details on notable Jewish people, obituaries, major events, fasts, festivals and a calendar. It is updated annually.

An appendix lists all Jews who currently hold various positions and honours, and a complete list of every Jew who has ever won the Victoria Cross or George Cross.

The ISSN of the series is ISSN 0075-3769 and the 2007 edition is ISBN 978-0-85303-735-4.
