= Emile-Auguste Begin =

French physician

Emile-Auguste Begin (24 April 1802 - 31 May 1888), also named as Émile Bégin, was a French medical doctor and historian. He was a member of the Academy of Metz and a Chevalier of the Légion d'honneur.

== Biography ==
Begin was born at Metz on 24 April 1802 to François-Nicolas Bégin, a prominent physician, and Marie Victorine Ledoux. Begin received his medical training at the University of Strasbourg.

During the Siege of Paris (1870–71), he treated the wounded, which earned him the Legion of Honor . In 1874, he was appointed assistant librarian at the Bibliothèque nationale de France a position that allowed him to continue his historical research. In 1881, Émile Bégin was appointed chief librarian at the Bibliothèque nationale de France.

Émile Bégin died on 31 May 1888, after visiting his hometown annexed by the German Empire . He is buried in the cemetery of Montrouge in Paris.

== Historical work ==
Bégin was a prolific writer and published many historical works, including a History of Lorraine in six volumes, and a History of the Kingdom of Austrasia in four volumes. Bégin also published historical essays and notes on Metz, Nancy, Neufchâteau. He wrote academic biographies of various historical figures, including Napoleon. He also published medical works.
