= Alexander Fuks =

German-born Israeli historian, archaeologist and papyrologist (1917–1978)

- אלכסנדר פוקס
- Born: 30 May 1917; Breslau, Lower Silesia, Germany
- Died: 29 November 1978 (aged 61)
- Scientific career
- Fields: History
- Workplaces: Hebrew University of Jerusalem

Alexander Fuks (Hebrew: אלכסנדר פוקס; 30 May 1917 – 29 November 1978) was a German-born Israeli historian, archaeologist and papyrologist. He worked with Victor Tcherikover and Menahem Stern on Corpus Papyrorum Judaicarum, the standard edition of Jewish papyri. He was a specialist in the study of Hellenistic Judaism.
