= Yossi Goldstein =

Israeli historian and biographer (born 1947)

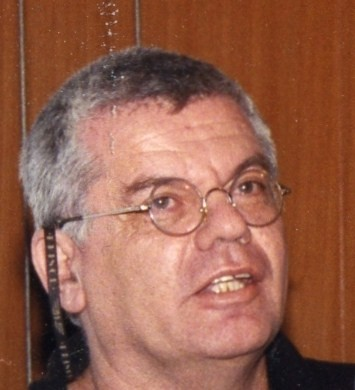
Yossi Goldstein

Yossi Goldstein (Hebrew: יוסי (יוסף) גולדשטיין; born 1947) is an Israeli historian and biographer. Goldstein's research focuses on Modern Jewish History, the History of Zionism, and the History of the State of Israel. Goldstein is a professor at the Faculty of the Social Sciences and the Humanities at the Ariel University Center. He has published biographies of Eli Horovitz, Levi Eshkol, Yitzhak Rabin and Golda Meir.

== Biography ==
Joseph (Yossi) Goldstein was born in Haifa. He served in the career army as a parachutist, and in 1974 completed his Bachelor of Arts (BA) in Russian studies at the Hebrew University of Jerusalem. Working on a master's degree at the Hebrew University, Goldstein wrote his thesis on “Israel’s Relations with the PLO, 1964-1969.” In 1982, he received his doctoral degree at the Hebrew University of Jerusalem, based on his research of the Zionist Movement in Russia in 1897-1904. In 1984-1999, Goldstein taught at Haifa University. In 1977-1992, he taught at the Open University of Israel. Goldstein is a professor at the Faculty of the Social Sciences and the Humanities at Ariel University Center.

Goldstein is married to psychologist Orah Tamar née Foa. Goldstein has five children, one of them, journalist Tani Goldstein, from his first wife, the artist Sarah Sapan, and four from Orah: dancer Avigail Ilan; artist Anat Berman; Uri Goldstein, a student; and musician Yonatan Goldstein.

== Modern Jewish history ==
Goldstein distinguishes among five developments essential to modern Jewish history. All are interwoven and had a crucial impact on the Jews’ predicament since the second half of the 18th century: emigration, emancipation, cultural revolution, anti-Semitism, and Zionism. Each one of these developments had a dramatic influence on later events in Jewish history. In Goldstein's book "Jewish History in Modern Times", the five developments are considered in detail. Emigration altered the geographic spread of the Jewish diaspora, in the course of the last two centuries pushing the chief center of the Jews out of Eastern Europe – out of Russia and Poland – into the United States and the State of Israel. Goldstein claims emigration was spurred by financial considerations, equal rights, anti-Semitism, the Zionist movement and the birth of the State of Israel.

Goldstein also investigates the growth and development of the Jewish community in the US, the beginnings of Zionism, anti-Semitism, and the mutual blending of religion and nationalism in Jewish society. Emancipation or equal rights which the Jews were granted in European countries during the decades following the French Revolution, along with the cultural revolution which they experienced in the wake of these changes, advanced their integration in European and American society. The primary outgrowth of these processes was the secularization of Jewish society, whose beginnings date as far back as the Haskalah (Jewish Enlightenment) period in the first half of the 18th century. This became the heart of Jewish existence both culturally and socially in the course of the twentieth century, as the Orthodox community within Jewish society dwindled, becoming more and more of a minority. Modern Anti-Semitism is explained by Goldstein as a development bound up with three processes:

I. the Jews’ historical past, their dispersion in the diaspora, and their economic activities, along with the encounter between the Christian and the Jewish religion;

II. modernization of European society, and especially some of the developments attendant upon this, which became more and more pronounced beginning in the 1870s, such as the intensification of secularizing processes, the progress of modern science, and the democratization of European society;

III. dramatic changes within Jewish society, which had to do with the Jews’ economic activities and growing secularization. All these together comprised the basis for modern anti-Semitism, which reached its apogee in the Holocaust of European Jewry during World War II.

Goldstein explains the rise of Zionism and its success as a part of the development of European nationalism and the founding of modern national movements during the period following the French Revolution, alongside the economic development of the Jews and the growth of modern anti-Semitism. These developments led to the establishment of “Hovevei Zion,” the first Jewish national movement, and to that of the Zionist movement founded by Theodor Herzl. The emergence of the Zionist movement, side by side with emigration, secularization, and anti-Semitism, accelerated the implementation in practice of the Zionist idea and the creation of the State of Israel.

== History of Zionism ==
A different corpus of Goldstein's research works deals with the history of Zionism in its initial period, with emphasis on the Zionist movement which developed in Eastern Europe. As per Goldstein's claim, the basis for the Jewish national movement emerged specifically in Czarist Russia and nowhere else. True enough, it was Herzl, brought up in the bosom of the German-Central European-Jewish culture, by means of the steps he took to establish the Zionist Organization, was the one to found the movement which eventually formed the basis for the growth of Zionism and the establishment of the State of Israel.

Yet most of the movement's members came from Russia, and Russia was the setting where the most important of the movement's activities unfolded. Ever since Herzl's time, the movement's leaders, from Chaim Weizmann to David Ben-Gurion, were born and raised in the Czarist Empire. The culture of the Pale of Settlement was deeply rooted in their being. In the nine books and the dozens of articles which he has published, Goldstein considers from different angles how the growth of Zionism in Russia transformed the movement into one which ultimately led to the founding of the State of Israel.

In his published doctoral dissertation on the early years of the Zionist movement in Russia and in dozens of articles, Goldstein describes the reasons for the growth of Zionism in Russia after the initial founding of the movement, the ideology adopted by the movement's members, and especially their contribution to the Zionist Organization. The heart of the argument Goldstein unfurls derives from the view that the development of the movement specifically within the Pale of Jewish Settlement rather than anywhere else was dictated by the particular social and economic processes which affected the Jews living there at the time. This combined with the special attitude of the Czarist authorities toward the Jews, which Goldstein addresses in his book The Lopukhin Memorandum.

Goldstein demonstrates that an ideology peculiar to the Zionists of Russia evolved in the wake of the founding of the Zionist movement. This was “practical Zionism,” as distinguished from the “political Zionism” of Herzl. This Eastern European ideology, an outgrowth of the predicament of the Jewish community of the Pale, had an impact both socially and culturally, and affected leadership, as well. The biography of Menachem Ussishkin, a prominent Russian Zionist leader at the time, and numerous articles, all authored by Goldstein, elucidate the differences between the two ideologies, as well as detail the practical and political activities engaged in by the “practical Zionists.” As part of the same discussion, in the biography he has written of Ahad Ha-Am, in his book on Ahad Ha-Am and Herzl, and in numerous articles, Goldstein finds that the cultural differences which crystallized between the movement's Russian members (the Ost-Juden) and the Zionists of Central Europe, headed by Herzl (the West-Juden), created a far-reaching cultural barrier between the two groups. This came to the fore clearly in the profound political crisis stirred up in connection with the “Uganda Proposal.”

== History of the State of Israel ==
The third block of research is devoted to the history of the State of Israel in its early period. Goldstein has written the biographies of seven important figures from the early days of the State: three Prime Ministers – Levi Eshkol, Golda Meir, and Yitzhak Rabin – in office at various times during the years 1963-1995; and four additional biographies of prominent figures in politics, economics, industry, and science in the State of Israel.

Goldstein has written textbooks for different ages and levels, beginning with junior high school students, moving on to high school levels, and, finally, addressing college students’ needs.

== Publications ==
=== Books ===
1. Y. Goldstein, Ben tziyon le-tziyonut, toldot ha-tenuah ha-tziyonit, 1881-1914 [Between Zion and Zionism: History of the Zionist Movement, 1881-1914], volumes 1-5, Tel-Aviv: The Open University of Israel, 1979-1981.
2. Y. Goldstein, ed., introduction and comments, Dat u-leumiyut ba-tenuah ha-tziyonit, 1881-1912 [Religion and Nationalism in the Zionist Movement, 1881-1912], Tel-Aviv: The Open University of Israel, 1982 (395 pages).
3. Y. Goldstein, M. Yungman, ed., introduction and comments, Yehudei artzot-ha-brit, 1820-1880, Shaar I [Jews of the US, 1820-1880, Part I], Tel-Aviv: The Open University of Israel, 1986 (105 pages).
4. Y. Goldstein, M. Yungman, ed., introduction and comments, Yehudei artzot-ha-brit, 1880-1914, Shaar II [Jews of the US, 1880-1914, Part II], Tel-Aviv: The Open University of Israel, 1986 (240 pages).
5. Y. Goldstein, Sineat yisrael ve-antishemiyut [Hatred of the Jews and Anti-Semitism], volumes 1-5, Tel-Aviv: The Open University of Israel, 1986-1987.
6. Y. Goldstein, Tazkir Lopukhin [The Lopukhin Memorandum], Jerusalem: Dinur Center Press, The Hebrew University of Jerusalem, 1988 (academic ed., 188 pages).
7. Y. Goldstein, Ben tziyonut medinit le-tziyonut maasit, ha-tenuah ha-tziyonit be-russiyah be-reshitah [Between Zionism Political and Practical: The Early Years of the Zionist Movement in Russia], Jerusalem: Magnes Press, Ha-sifriyah ha-tziyonit, 1991 (256 pages, paperback, hardcover).
8. M. Tzimmerman, Y. Goldstein, Historiyah shel ha-meah ha-esrim, ha-olam ve-ha-yehudim ba-dorot ha-acharonim, 1880-1914 [Twentieth-Century History: The World and the Jews in Recent Times, 1880-1914], Jerusalem: Zalman Shazar Center, 1992 (370 pages).
9. Y. Goldstein, Ahad ha-am, biyografiyah [Ahad Ha-Am: A Biography], Jerusalem: Keter Publishers, 1992 (511 pages).
10. Y. Goldstein, Ben tziyon le-tziyonut – toldot ha-tenuah ha-tziyonit 1881-1914 [Between Zion and Zionism: History of the Zionist Movement, 1881-1914], volumes 1-4, Tel-Aviv: The Open University of Israel 1994-2000.
11. 2005, (J. Goldstein, Jewish History in Modern Times, Brighton: Sussex Academic Press, 1996 (224 pages, hardcover, 2005 paperback.
12. Mekimim medinah [Setting Up State], ed. N. Barzel, Tel-Aviv: Ha-kibbutz ha-meuchad, 1997, pp. 9–64.
13. A. Dumkah, ed., Ha-olam ve-hayehudim ba-dorot ha-acharonim, 1920-1970 [The World and the Jews in Recent Times, 1920-1970], Part I, Jerusalem: Zalman Shazar Center, 1998 (287 pages, of which approx. 150 were written by Y. Goldstein).
14. A. Dumkah, ed., Ha-olam ve-hayehudim ba-dorot ha-acharonim, 1920-1970 [The World and the Jews in Recent Times, 1920-1970], Part II, Jerusalem: Zalman Shazar Center, 1999 (333 pages, of which approx. 100 were written by Y. Goldstein).
15. (Y. Goldstein, Ussishkin, biyografiyah [Ussishkin: A Biography], Part 1, Jerusalem: Magnes Press, 1999, (308 pages.
16. Y. Goldstein, Ussishkin, biyografiyah [Ussishkin: A Biography], Part 2, Jerusalem: Magnes Press, 2001 (240 pages).
17. Yosef Goldstein, Istoriya sionistkogo dvizheniya, 1881-1914, Kniga 1-5 [History of the Zionist Movement, 1881-1914, Books 1-5, Rus. transl.], Tel-Aviv: The Open University of Israel, 2001-2006.
18. Y. Goldstein, Ha-begidah be-eretz ha-bechirah [Betrayal of the Land of Choice], Jerusalem: Keter Publishers, 2002 (272 pages).
19. Y. Goldstein, Eshkol, biografiyah [Eshkol: A Biography], Jerusalem: Keter Publishers, 2003 (789 pages).
20. Y. Goldstein, Rabin, biografiyah [Rabin: A Biography], Tel Aviv: Schocken Books, 2006 (590 pages).
21. Y. Goldstein, ed., Manhigut be-itot milchamah [Leadership in Times of War], Yad Chaim Weizmann, Ministry of Security Publications, 2008 (229 pages).
22. A. Dumkah, Y. Goldstein, H. Urbach, Tz. Goldberg, Ha-leumiyut, reshit ha-derekh [Nationalism: Embarking upon the Road], senior high school textbook, Jerusalem: Zalman Shazar Center, 2008.
23. A. Dumkah, H. Urbach, Tz. Goldberg (written by Y. Goldstein, M. Golani, Y. Dror, Y. Witz, H. Saadon), Bonim medinah ba-mizrach ha-tikhon, ha-leumiyut II [Building a State in the Middle East: Nationalism II], senior high school textbook, Jerusalem: Zalman Shazar Center, 2009.
24. Y. Goldstein, ed., Yosef daat, mechkarim be-historiyah yehudit modernit mugashim le-professor yosef salmon le-chag yovlo [He Who Adds Knowledge: Studies in Modern Jewish History Presented to Professor Yosef Salmon upon His Jubilee], Beer Sheva University, 2010.
25. Yossi Goldstein, Aryeh Dayan, Kareu lo yap, yaakov arnon, ben amsterdam li-yerushalayim [They Called Him Jaap: Yaakov Arnon between Amsterdam and Jerusalem], Tel Aviv: Hakibutz Ha-meuhad, 2010 (262 pages).
26. Y. Goldstein, Ahad ha-am ve-hertzl: Ha-maavak al ofyah ha-politi ve-ha-tarbuti shel ha-tziyonut be-tzel “parshat altneuland” [Ahad Ha-Am and Herzl: The Struggle for Zionism's Political and Cultural Profile in the Shadow of the “Altneuland Episode”], Jerusalem: Dinur Center Press, Zalman Shazar Center, 2011 (237 pages).
27. Y. Goldstein, Eli Horovitz, Tel Aviv & Jerusalem: Schocken Books, 2012.
28. Y. Goldstein, Golda, biyografiyah [Golda: A Biography], Ben-Gurion University, 2012 (649 pages).
29. Y. Goldstein, Anu hayinu ha-rishonim, toldot hibat tziyon, 1881-1918 [We Were the First: History of Hovevei Zion, 1881-1918], accepted by Mossad Bialik, 2016 (420 pages).
30. Y. Goldstein, Michael Sela, Schocken Books (accepted by Schoken Publishing House, 2013).
31. Yossi Goldstein, Ben-Gurion, Biography, two vols. bar Ilan University Press 2019
