= Menahem Stern =

Israeli historian

- מנחם שטרן
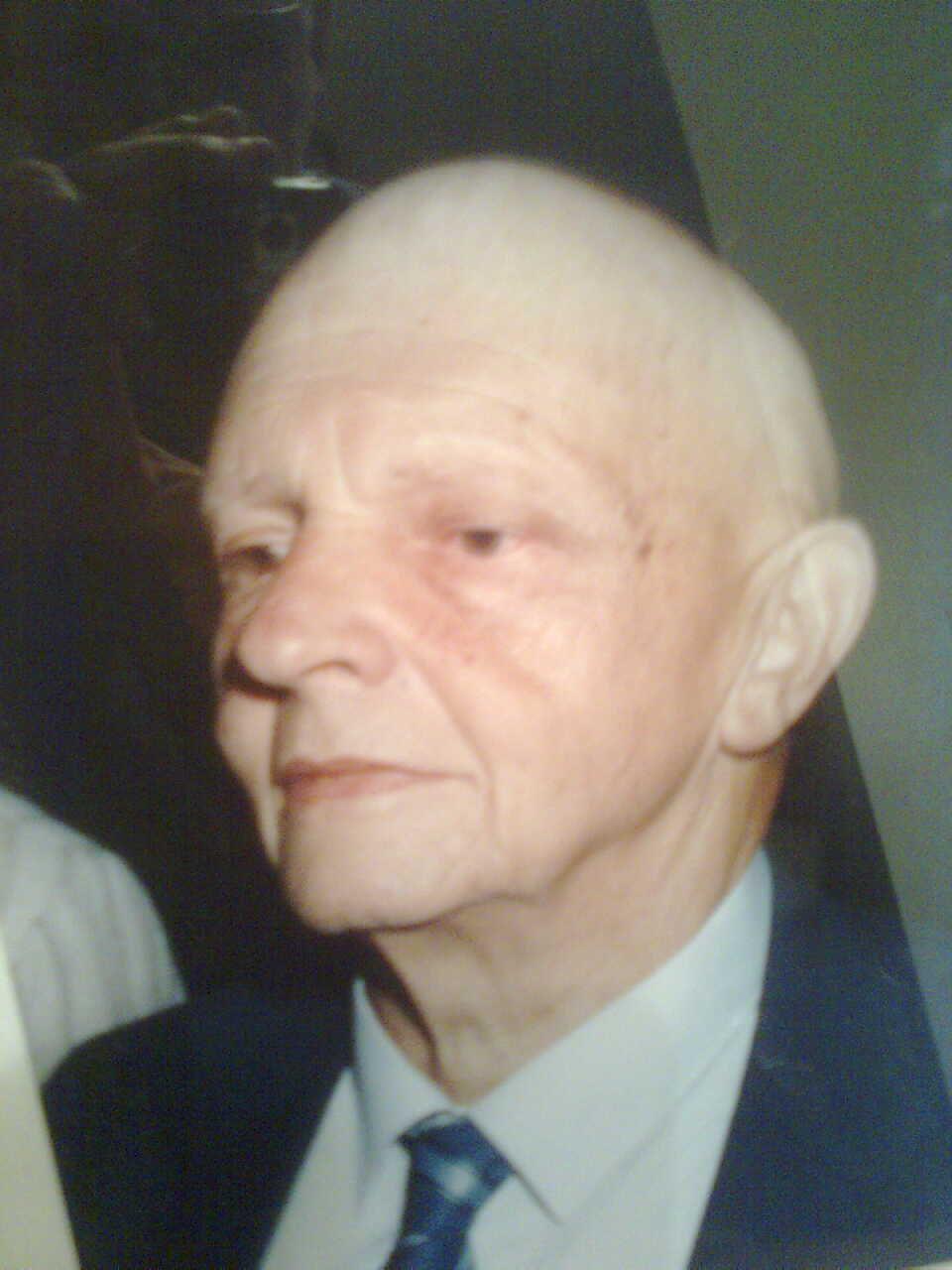
- Menahem Stern, 1988
- Born: March 5, 1925; Białystok, Poland
- Died: June 22, 1989 (aged 64); Givat Ram, Jerusalem
- Resting place: Har HaMenuchot; 31°47′53″N 35°10′40″E
- Education: Hebrew University of Jerusalem
- Known for: Second Temple period historian
- Children: 4

Menahem Stern (Hebrew: מנחם שטרן; March 5, 1925 – June 22, 1989) was an internationally acclaimed Israeli historian of the Second Temple period. He was murdered in Jerusalem by Palestinians during the First Intifada.

== Biography ==
Menahem Stern was born in 1925 in Białystok, Poland. His father was a Lithuanian misnaged while his mother came from a Hasidic family. In his childhood he studied Hebrew and religious texts, but later acquired a general education that included Latin. In 1938 he immigrated to Palestine with his parents via Vienna. They settled in Haifa, where he studied at the Hebrew Reali School. When the family moved to Tel Aviv, he switched to Geulah high school, from which he graduated in 1942.

In 1943, after working on a kibbutz for a year, he enrolled in the History of the Jewish people, General History and Classical Studies departments at the Hebrew University of Jerusalem. In 1950, he received his M.A.

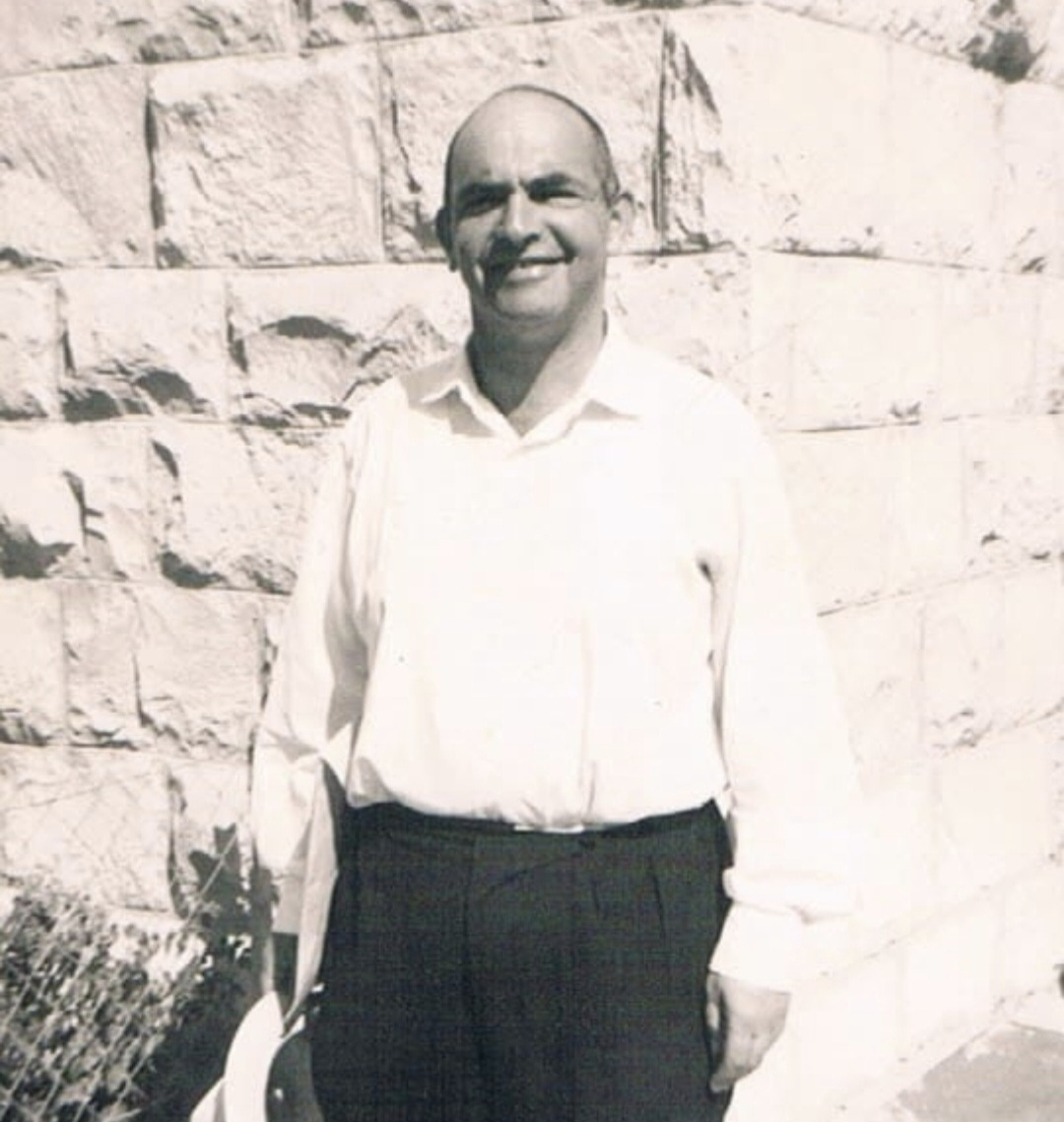
Stern in 1970

In 1952, after his marriage to Hava Brenner, the niece of Hebrew-language author Yosef Haim Brenner, he spent two and a half years at Oxford. Upon his return to Jerusalem in 1954 he received the highest research award in Jewish Studies of the Warburg Foundation.

After a year he began teaching at the university. In 1960 he received his Ph.D. and was appointed lecturer of the history of the Jewish people in Second Temple period. In 1964 he was promoted to senior lecturer, in 1966 to associate professor and in 1971 to full professor.

From 1963 he edited the Corpus Papyrorum Judaicarum.

== Awards and honours ==
In 1977, Stern won the Israel Prize, for history of the Jewish people.

In 1979, he was appointed to the Israeli National Academy of Science and became one of its most active members.

He was president of the Historical Society of Israel, a founder of the Zalman Shazar Center and an editor of Zion. He was on the Executive Committee of the World Union of Jewish Studies and was very active in Yad Yitzhak Ben Zvi.

== Murder ==
On June 22, 1989, Stern was murdered by Palestinian terrorists while walking to the Jewish National and University Library in Givat Ram through the Valley of the Cross in Jerusalem, as he did every day. He left a wife, a son and three daughters. The annual Menahem Stern Jerusalem Lectures were established in his name.

== Published works ==
- The Great Families of the Period of the Second Temple (1959)
- The Documentation of the Maccabee Rebellion (1965)
- Greek and Latin authors on Jews and Judaism edited with introductions, translations and commentary by Menahem Stern. Jerusalem: Israel Academy of Sciences and Humanities, (c1974-c1984)
- Studies in the History of the People of Israel in the Period of the Second Temple (1991, published posthumously)
- The Reign of Herod (1992, published posthumously)
- Hasmonean Judea in the Hellenistic World: Chapters in Political History (1995, published posthumously)

== See also ==
- List of Israel Prize recipients
