= Hasmonean Judea =

Jewish kingdom in the southern Levant (140–37 BC)

Hasmonean Judea ממלכת החשמונאים Mamleḵeṯ hāḤašmonaʾim
- 141–37 BCE
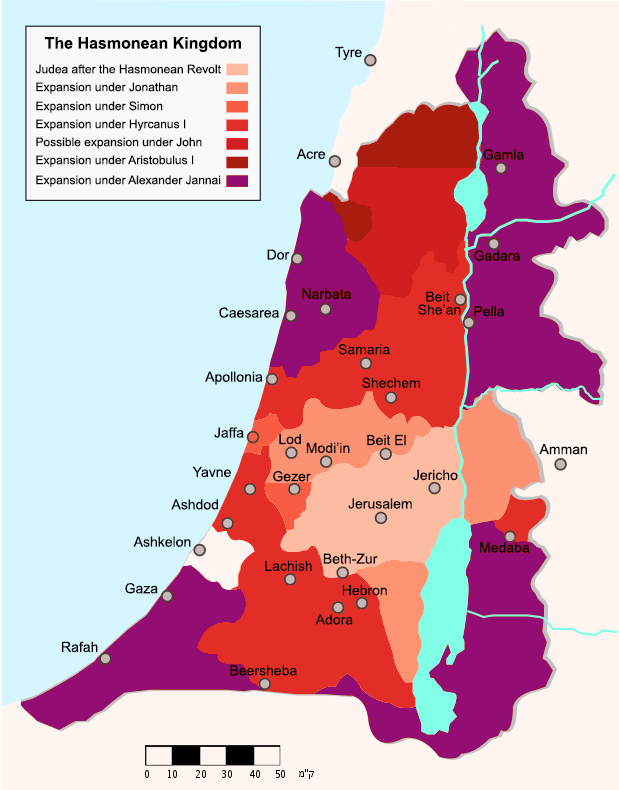
- Status: Seleucid Empire vassal (141–110 BCE); Independent kingdom (111–63 BCE); Client state of the Roman Republic (63–40 BCE); Client state of the Parthian Empire (40–37 BCE)
- Capital: Jerusalem
- Common languages: Middle Aramaic (Note: Also known as Hasmonean Aramaic and Post-Achaemenid Imperial Aramaic); Classical Hebrew; Koine Greek
- Religion: Second Temple Judaism
- Government: Theocratic monarchy
- High Priest and ethnarch/king
  - 142/1–134 BCE: Simon Thassi
  - 134 (110)–104 BCE: John Hyrcanus
  - 104–103 BCE: Aristobulus I
  - 103–76 BCE: Alexander Jannaeus
  - 76–67 BCE: Salome Alexandra
  - 67–66 BCE: Hyrcanus II
  - 66–63 BCE: Aristobulus II
  - 63–40 BCE: Hyrcanus II
  - 40–37 BCE: Antigonus
- Historical era: Hellenistic Age
  - Maccabean Revolt: 167 BCE
  - Dynasty established: 141 BCE
  - Full independence: 110 BCE
  - Pompey intervenes in Hasmonean civil war: 63 BCE
  - Parthian invasion: 40 BCE
  - Overthrown by Herod the Great: 37 BCE
- Currency: Hasmonean coinage
Preceded by	Succeeded by
Hellenistic Palestine	Herodian kingdom
- Today part of: Israel; Palestine; Jordan; Syria; Egypt; Lebanon

Hasmonean Judea, also known in part of its history as the Hasmonean kingdom, was a Jewish state in Judea and its surrounding regions during the later part of the Hellenistic and early Roman eras of the Second Temple period. The Hasmonean state emerged from the Maccabean Revolt against the Seleucid Empire. It was ruled by the Hasmonean dynasty, which was founded by Simon Thassi, one of the Maccabee brothers, and his descendants. Its rulers initially combined the offices of high priest and ethnarch, though later leaders eventually assumed the title of king. Initially, Judea remained semi-autonomous under Seleucid hegemony, but as Seleucid authority declined, the Hasmoneans gained full independence and expanded their territory into neighboring regions, including Perea, Samaria, Idumaea, Galilee, and Iturea.

The Maccabees launched their revolt against the Seleucids in the 160s BCE, with Judas Maccabeus's victories and the rededication of the Jerusalem Temple following its desecration by the Seleucids. After Judas's death in battle, his brother Jonathan revived the movement, secured Seleucid recognition, and was appointed High Priest. Following Jonathan's execution, their brother Simon took command, expelled the Seleucid garrison from Jerusalem, and achieved independence, marking the foundation of the Hasmonean state. Simon was later assassinated by his son-in-law.

Simon was succeeded by his son John Hyrcanus, who at first accepted Seleucid suzerainty but soon asserted independence and expanded Jewish control into Samaria and Idumaea. His son Judah Aristobulus conquered Galilee. Under his successor, Alexander Jannaeus, the Hasmonean kingdom reached its greatest territorial extent—Israel's largest since the biblical monarchy—but was torn by civil war. After his death, power passed to his wife, Salome Alexandra, whose reign brought stability and prosperity. Her death, however, triggered a succession war between their two sons, leading to Roman intervention under Pompey in 63 BCE and the end of Judea's independence. Hyrcanus II was installed as a client ruler, though his authority was contested by his younger brother Aristobulus II. Later, Aristobulus's son, Mattathias Antigonus, briefly re-established Hasmonean independence as the dynasty's last monarch before the Romans installed the Herodian dynasty as rulers of Judea in 37 BCE.

The Hasmonean kingdom was the first independent Jewish polity since the fall of the Kingdom of Judah in 587/6 BCE, and a rare example of indigenous rule in an age dominated by great empires. When Judea came under Roman rule, Jews continued to look back to the Hasmonean period as a golden age of independence; the idea that Judea could be free again fueled aspirations for freedom and inspired the Jewish–Roman wars.

== History ==
=== Prelude: the Maccabean Revolt ===
In 332 BCE, Judea was conquered by Alexander the Great, and after his death it became a contested territory among the Hellenistic successor states. For over a century Ptolemaic Egypt ruled the southern Levant, until c. 200 BCE, when the Seleucid Empire, based in Syria, gained control of the region. Initially, the Seleucids treated the Jews favorably: Antiochus III the Great granted them autonomy and the right to live according to their ancestral laws. The situation deteriorated under his successor, Antiochus IV Epiphanes, who sold the high priesthood to the highest bidder, transformed Jerusalem into a Hellenized polis, and deepened divisions between pro-Hellenists and traditionalists loyal to the Torah.

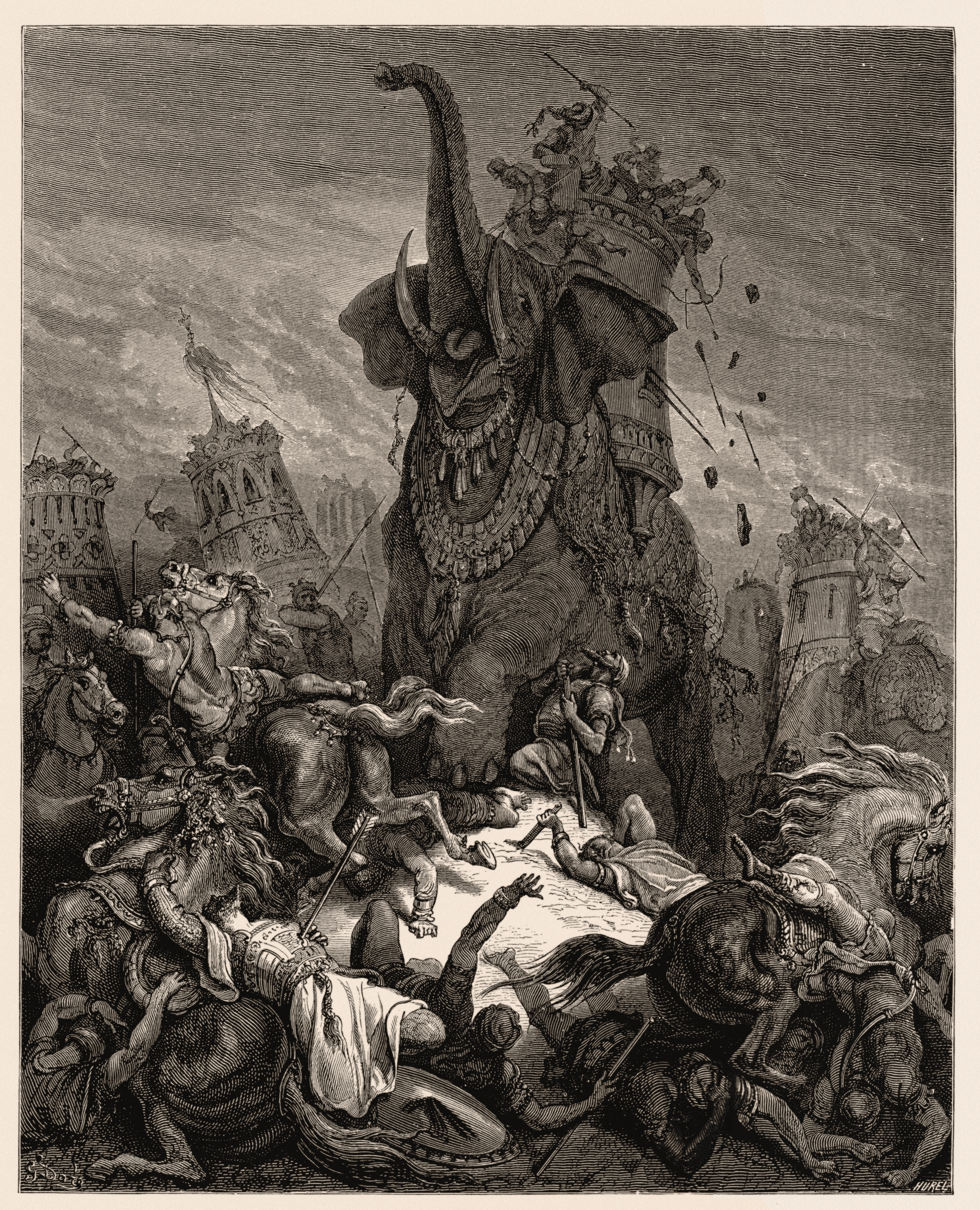
Battle of Beth Zechariah in 162 BCE, where the Maccabean rebels suffered a temporary setback. Illustration by Gustave Doré in 1866.

When Antiochus, humiliated after a failed Egyptian campaign, issued decrees banning Jewish practices and desecrated the Jerusalem Temple in 167 BCE, rebellion erupted. According to 1 Maccabees, the uprising began in the town of Modi'in, where Mattathias, a priest of the Hasmonean family, killed both a Hellenized Jew and a royal official who ordered him to sacrifice to the Greek gods. Mattathias and his sons—the Maccabean brothers—then fled to the wilderness, rallying others to resist both the Seleucid authorities and their local collaborators.

After Mattathias's death, leadership passed to his son Judas Maccabeus. He proved an exceptional commander, winning victories over Seleucid forces at Beth Horon, Emmaus, and other sites between 166 and 164 BCE. These successes allowed the rebels to retake Jerusalem and purify the Second Temple, which had been defiled by pagan worship. The rededication, on the 25th of Kislev (November/December) 164 BCE–three years to the day after its desecration–is commemorated to this day on the Jewish festival of Hanukkah. Although the new Seleucid regime under Antiochus V revoked the religious decrees and again recognized the Jews as an ethnos, the Hasmonean struggle for independence continued.

In subsequent years, Judah faced renewed Seleucid attacks. At Beth Zechariah, his brother Eleazar died heroically fighting war elephants. When the Seleucid general Lysias temporarily besieged Jerusalem, political turmoil in the Seleucid capital, Antioch, forced him to withdraw. The Seleucid commander Nicanor negotiated with Judah but later fought against him, culminating in Nicanor's defeat and death at Adasa. In 161 BCE, the Jews sent two ambassadors to Rome, where they secured a treaty of friendship and alliance between the Jewish people and the Roman Republic. In 160 BCE, Judah was killed during the Battle of Elasa, where he fought the army of Seleucid general Bacchides. His death marked a setback for the revolt.

=== Jonathan Apphus (160–143 BCE) ===
After Bacchides renewed his suppression of the Hasmonean party, Jonathan Apphus, Judah's brother, assumed leadership of the surviving rebels. He and his followers escaped to the wilderness of Tekoa, established a base in the Judaean Desert at Bor Asphar, fought off Seleucid pursuit across the Jordan River, and gradually rebuilt the movement's strength. Bacchides soon withdrew, and fighting subsided for a time. It resumed in 157 BCE when Jonathan's Hellenist opponents called on the Syrians for aid. Bacchides returned, but Jonathan and his brother Simon fortified themselves at Beth-Basi near Bethlehem and successfully resisted his siege. After suffering heavy losses, Bacchides made peace with Jonathan, who settled in Michmas.

A decisive change came in 153 BCE when a civil war broke out in Syria between Demetrius I and the pretender Alexander Balas. To prevent Jonathan from siding with Balas, Demetrius released the hostages held in the Akra citadel in Jerusalem and allowed Jonathan to raise troops and reside in Jerusalem. Jonathan rebuilt Jerusalem's walls and also those of the Temple Mount. The fortresses Bacchides had built were dismantled as Demetrius needed his troops for the dynastic struggle, leaving only garrisons in the Akra and Beth-zur.

In 152 BCE, Balas sought Jonathan's support by appointing him High Priest and formally recognizing him as the ruler of Judea, also adding him to the order of the "king's friends", one of the honorifics of the Seleucid regime. As a High Priest, Jonathan received permission to wear a purple robe and a golden crown sent by Alexander Balas, and appeared in them at the Jewish festival of Sukkot. Demetrius I was defeated in the summer of 150 BCE, but a few years later, around 147 BCE, his son Demetrius II renewed the Seleucid civil war. Jonathan defeated his general Apollonius near Ashdod, stationed a garrison in the port city of Jaffa, and burned the temple of Dagon in Ashdod. Balas granted him the city of Ekron and its territories, which now made Judea the ruler of the entire ancient region of Philistia. After Balas was defeated and killed, Demetrius II became sole ruler of the Seleucid kingdom.

Jonathan maintained a firm stance toward Demetrius II and even besieged the Akra. Meeting with the king at Acre, he secured exemption of Judea from taxation and annexation of three toparchies (districts) already inhabited by Jews—Ephraim, Lod, and Ramathaim—that were previously part of Samaria, in return for lifting the siege and paying 300 talents. (Note: Archaeological evidence suggests that Jews had already settled in the areas of Ephraim, Lod, and Ramathaim (possibly Khirbet esh-Shuna) before the annexation, as indicated by the presence of Jewish artifacts. The annexation of these toparchies likely involved territorial expansion and conflict with the local non-Jewish population, as evidenced by destruction layers and fortifications in the region.) He also sent Jewish troops to assist Demetrius in suppressing a revolt in Antioch.

Relations later deteriorated, as Demetrius refused to evacuate the Akra. Jonathan shifted his allegiance to the Seleucid general Diodotus-Tryphon, tutor of Balas' young son Antiochus VI. Tryphon confirmed Jonathan's authority and appointed his brother Simon commander of the coastal region from Tyre to the Egyptian border. The brothers campaigned against Demetrius' supporters, with Jonathan going as far as Galilee, northern Syria, and the Eleutherus River (today's Nahr al-Kabir, Lebanon). Simon captured Beth-zur, replacing the Syrian garrison with a Jewish one; He also stationed Jewish troops in Jaffa, and fortified Hadid in the Judaean Lowlands. Jonathan, returning from the north, strengthened Judea's defenses and tightened the siege of the Akra. Jonathan also renewed Judea's alliance with Rome and reportedly corresponded with the city-state of Sparta.

=== Simon Thassi (143–135 BCE) ===
In 143 BCE, Tryphon lured Jonathan to Acre under pretense of ceding control on the city; however, Jonathan's bodyguard was massacred and he was taken captive. His brother Simon Thassi immediately assumed leadership; He completed Jerusalem's fortifications, dispatched a Jewish garrison to Jaffa, expelled its Gentile inhabitants, and resettled Jews there. Tryphon advanced against Judea, claiming Jonathan was held only as a hostage for a state debt. Simon paid the demanded ransom and even sent Jonathan's sons as hostages, but Tryphon continued his campaign without freeing him. Simon then forced Tryphon's army onto indirect routes, and heavy snowfall ultimately blocked its advance toward Jerusalem and its effort to relieve the Akra garrison. He eventually withdrew to Gilead in northern Transjordan and executed Jonathan at Baskama. Simon later recovered his brother's body and buried it in a new family mausoleum at Modi'in honoring his parents and brothers.

Simon renewed relations with Demetrius II, receiving gifts, the right to mint coinage, and full tax exemption for Judea. This was regarded by the Jews as the beginning of Judea's independence, and from 143/142 BCE onward, the years were counted according to the reigns of Hasmonean rulers. According to 1 Maccabees, in that year "the yoke of the Gentiles was lifted from Israel, and the people began to write on their records and their contracts, 'in the first year of Simon, the great High Priest, commander and leader of the Jews'." Simon conquered Gazara, expelled its Gentile inhabitants, and settled Jews there. He also cultivated diplomatic relations with the Roman Republic and Sparta.

In 142-1 BCE Simon achieved the principal goal of his predecessors by capturing the Akra in Jerusalem; its inhabitants were expelled. Both 1 Maccabees and Megillat Ta'anit note that the day of its capture was declared a festival. The Hellenist party was never mentioned again. Josephus reports that Simon ordered the hill on which the Akra stood to be leveled so it would no longer overlook the Temple. However, 1 Maccabees states that he fortified the site and settled Jews there.

In September 140 BCE, the assembled people declared Simon their high priest, commander and ethnarch—a position described by Tessa Rajak as 'head of the nation'—"forever, until a trustworthy prophet shall arise".

Meanwhile, conflict in Syria continued. In 139 BCE Demetrius II was captured by the Parthians, and his brother Antiochus VII Sidetes became king. After defeating Tryphon, Antiochus confirmed all Simon's privileges and even granted him the right to mint coinage—though Simon apparently never used it. Around 138 he besieged Tryphon at Dor, likely with Simon's help; Tryphon escaped but died at Apamea in 137 BCE. Antiochus then demanded the return of the Akra, Gezer, and Jaffa, or a payment totaling one thousand talents. Simon rejected the demands, declaring that the Jews had merely regained their ancestral land: "We have neither taken foreign land nor seized foreign property, but only the inheritance of our ancestors, which at one time had been unjustly taken by our enemies", instead offering just a token of 100 talents. Antiochus sent his general Kendebaios against Judea, but Simon's sons John and Judah defeated him near Kedron and Ashdod.

In 134 BCE, Simon was assassinated at a banquet in the fortress of Dok near Jericho by his son-in-law Ptolemy ben Abubus, governor of the plain of Jericho, in an attempt to seize power. Ptolemy also took Simon's wife and two of his sons hostage, but his third son, John Hyrcanus, was warned in advance and escaped, soon succeeding his father as ruler of Judea.

=== John Hyrcanus (135–104 BCE) ===
After escaping Ptolemy's plot, Hyrcanus fled to Jerusalem, where the citizens refused to admit Ptolemy. He gained power by mobilizing his forces and was accepted as High Priest. He then besieged Ptolemy in the fortress of Dok, but failed to capture it. Ptolemy then murdered Hyrcanus's mother and brothers before fleeing to Philadelphia.

Soon afterward, Antiochus VII besieged Hyrcanus in Jerusalem. Antiochus allowed a truce during Sukkot and sent offerings for the Temple. The two eventually agreed that Judea would pay tribute for Jaffa and other border towns. Antiochus also ordered Jerusalem's walls demolished and demanded a garrison, which Hyrcanus declined on religious grounds; instead, he sent hostages and additional silver to secure an agreement. Josephus reports that Hyrcanus opened David's Tomb to obtain funds. The money was apparently used to hire mercenaries, marking the first known use of such troops by a Hasmonean ruler. Relations between Hyrcanus and Antiochus remained positive, and around 130 BCE, Hyrcanus joined the king's campaign against the Parthians, commanding a Jewish contingent. Antiochus was killed in battle against the Parthian king Phraates II in about 129 BCE, after which his brother Demetrius II was released and restored to the Seleucid throne.

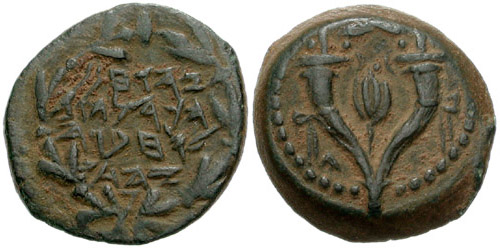
Bronze prutah of John Hyrcanus: Hebrew legend "Yehohanan (John) the High Priest and the Council of the Jews" within a wreath; reverse with double cornucopiae and a pomegranate between the horns

After Antiochus VII's death in 129 BCE, internal conflicts within the Seleucid Empire allowed Hyrcanus to act independently. He stopped paying tribute and began expanding Judea's territory. First, he captured the town of Medaba in Moab, followed by Samoga, which seems to have been located in the same area. He then turned to the region of Samaria, capturing Shechem and Mount Gerizim, where he destroyed the Samaritan temple—archaeological evidence supports this event around 112 BCE. Hyrcanus next conquered Idumaea, capturing the towns of Maresha and Adoraim, annexing the region, and requiring the Idumaean population to adopt Judaism. While it remains debated whether this conversion was enforced or undertaken voluntarily, it appears to have been effective, as the Idumaeans subsequently became integrated into the Jewish people.

Hyrcanus then besieged the city of Samaria, a Macedonian colony, and assigned the operation to his sons Aristobulus and Antigonus. Josephus claims that this was in retaliation for an attack by the people of Samaria on the Mariseans (the people of Maresha), though this explanation is doubtful given the distance between the two locations. (Note: Bezalel Bar-Kochva, following an emendation proposed by Michael Avi-Yonah, argues that Josephus's reference to the Mariseans is a textual corruption of "Gariseans", referring to the inhabitants of Gerasa (modern Jurish), southeast of Shechem. He identifies the settlement as a Jewish bridgehead established on the eastern flank of the Samarian highlands during Hasmonean expansion. On this interpretation, attacks by the Samaritans on Gerasa provided Hyrcanus with a casus belli for the siege.) More likely, John Hyrcanus aimed to eliminate a major Seleucid stronghold. After a year-long siege, Samaria fell around 108 BCE despite assistance sent by Antiochus VIII or IX and Ptolemaic allies. With its capture, Hyrcanus extended Judea's control north to Scythopolis and west to Mount Carmel, securing dominance over the country's center. Archaeological surveys suggest that the Eastern Galilee was likewise brought under Hasmonean control by Hyrcanus, likely in the final years of his reign. Archaeological evidence indicates that, following its conquest, the then-sparsely populated area became Jewish largely through immigration from Judea rather than through conversion of the local inhabitants.

John Hyrcanus enjoyed great admiration among his Jewish subjects. According to Josephus, God had granted him three exceptional gifts: rule over the nation, the high priesthood, and prophecy. A story found both in Josephus and in the Talmud relates that when his sons defeated the Seleucids in battle, he heard a heavenly voice announcing their victory. Josephus and Rabbinic sources indicate that John Hyrcanus was a popular ruler. The Mishnah refers to him as Yohanan ha-Kohen ("John the Priest") and attributes specific halakhic rulings to him, such as removing the declarations of the tithes and abolishing the "awakeners" and "knockers". Josephus records an account of a banquet conflict where a Pharisee demanded Hyrcanus lay aside the high priesthood because his mother had supposedly been taken captive under Antiochus Epiphanes. According to this account, the ruler subsequently rejected the Oral Law, became a Sadducee, and persecuted the Pharisees. However, a parallel account in the Babylonian Talmud attributes this confrontation and the subsequent consequences to Alexander Jannaeus. Although scholars traditionally assumed Josephus' version correct on chronological grounds, Markham J. Geller argues that the Talmudic version is the more original account, and that Josephus or his source erroneously implicated Hyrcanus in the rift instead of Jannaeus.

=== Judah Aristobolus (104–103 BCE) ===
After John Hyrcanus's death, his son Judah Aristobulus came to power. According to Josephus, he was the first of the Hasmonean line to assume the royal title. In contrast, the Greek historian and geographer Strabo, writing in the age of Augustus, attributes this act to Alexander Jannaeus—a view supported by Jannaeus's coins, which are the first to bear the title "king," while Judah's own coins refer to him only as high priest. However, Strabo may have been mistaken, given the limited information available about Judah's brief reign. Josephus reports that Aristobulus imprisoned his mother and brothers, killing one of them, Antigonus, amid court intrigue that may have contributed to his early death. Josephus wrote that under Aristobolus, the Itureans, an Arab tribe centered in southern Lebanon, were forced to convert to Judaism. However, this claim is disputed, as no corroborating sources or archaeological evidence confirm such a conversion. (Note: Some earlier scholars accepted Josephus’s report that Aristobulus converted the Itureans either as historical fact (e.g., Emil Schürer) or as a process of voluntary Judaization (e.g., Aryeh Kasher and Ariel Rappaport). However, as archaeologist Uzi Leibner notes, recent archaeological work identifies Iturean material culture in the Beqaa Valley, the northern Golan, and Mount Hermon (not in the Upper or Lower Galilee) and indicates that this region lay outside Hasmonean borders and remained Iturean-pagan; there is also evidence for Hasmonean control east of the Sea of Galilee before Aristobulus. Accordingly, many scholars now regard Josephus's report as unreliable.) Aristobulus's reign was brief; he died after only one year on the throne.

=== Alexander Jannaeus (103–76 BCE) ===
After Judah's death, his widow helped his brother Alexander Jannaeus ascend to the throne. By the time Jannaeus came to power, most of the country's interior was already under Hasmonean control. He therefore turned to securing the country's key strategic points, many held by Hellenistic cities along its borders, as well as confronting neighboring powers with competing interests, especially the Nabataean Kingdom to the south. One of his first campaigns targeted the Greco-Phoenician city of Acre. The inhabitants called on the exiled Egyptian king Ptolemy IX for aid, who arrived from Cyprus with a large army. Jannaeus in turn sought help from Ptolemy's mother, Queen Cleopatra III of Egypt. Ptolemy defeated Jannaeus near the Jordan River and invaded Judea, but was eventually driven out by Cleopatra's forces. Her advisers urged her to annex Judea, yet the Jewish commander Ananias, serving in her army, warned her of a Jewish mutiny if she did so. Jannaeus ultimately secured an alliance with Egypt.

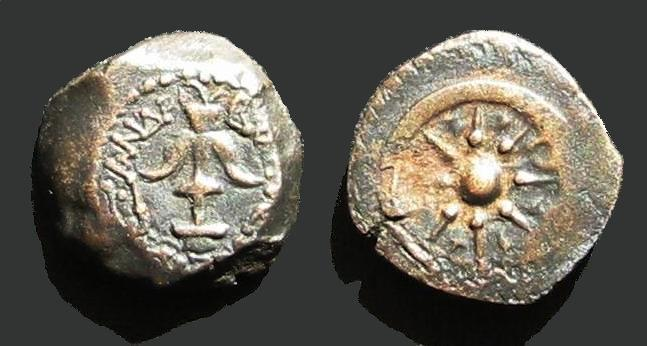
Prutah of Alexander Jannaeus with an anchor and the Greek inscription "King Alexander"

Jannaeus then launched a campaign against the Hellenistic cities. He captured Gadara and the fortress of Amathus. Later, in 96 BCE conquered the southern coastal plain—including Rafah, Anthedon, and Gaza, then a major trade hub allied with the Nabataeans. Gaza fell after a long siege despite Nabataean aid, though with heavy Jewish losses. Jannaeus spared Ashkelon, an ally of the Ptolemies, and had earlier secured control of Strato's Tower (later Caesarea) and Dor. His campaign against the Nabataean king Obodas I in the Transjordan ended in a major defeat, forcing him to retreat.

This defeat triggered a violent civil war between Alexander Jannaeus and his Jewish opponents, who invited Demetrius III Eucaerus to intervene; he subsequently invaded Judea. One reason for the rebellion against Jannaeus appears to have been his attempt to consolidate absolute power. His alignment with the Sadducees also provoked the Pharisees, especially amid disputes over Temple ritual and Jewish law. According to Josephus, during Sukkot he was pelted with citrons by worshippers who accused him of being unfit for the high priesthood, claiming that he was of captive descent—an episode some scholars associate with a Talmudic account of a Sadducee who was likewise struck with citrons after pouring the water libation on his feet instead of on the altar, in defiance of Pharisaic practice. The resulting civil war was bitter and prolonged, reportedly lasting six years and claiming around 50,000 lives. Eventually, Demetrius withdrew to face his brother Philip's challenge in Syria, leaving Jannaeus to besiege the remaining rebels at a place called Bethoma (or Besemlis). After their defeat, Josephus recounts that Jannaeus had their families killed before their eyes and crucified about 800 of them while he feasted with his concubines. Some 8,000 of Jannaeus's opponents then fled Judea and remained in exile for the rest of his reign.

Jannaeus relinquished his Transjordanian conquests to guard against further Nabataean incursions and was unable to prevail over Antiochus XII Dionysus of Syria, who invaded Judea and breached the newly built defensive line stretching from Chapharsaba to Jaffa. By the late 80s BCE, however, Jannaeus's fortunes improved. With Ptolemy IX dead and the Seleucid capital Antioch under Armenian control, he renewed his eastern campaigns. Between 83 and 76 BCE he conquered Dion, Pella, and Gerasa in the Transjordan, gained control of Gamla, Seleucia, and Gaulana in the Golan Heights, the "Valley of Antiochus", and reclaimed territories in Gilead and Moab that he had previously ceded to the Nabataeans. By the time of his death during a siege of Ragaba, the borders of his kingdom had reached their greatest extent, representing Israel's largest territory since the biblical monarchy.

=== Salome Alexandra (76–67 BCE) ===
Salome Alexandra (also Shelamzion) succeeded her husband Alexander Jannaeus and ruled Judea for nine years, a period later remembered by rabbinic tradition as a "golden age" of prosperity. According to Josephus, she followed her husband's reported deathbed advice to reconcile with the Pharisees, whose influence came to dominate her reign. Pharisaic legal norms were reinstated, and their leaders, such as Simeon ben Shetach, held significant authority in both religious and civic life. While this strengthened popular support, it also alienated parts of the Sadducean faction, some of whose members were purged or sidelined, though as a group the Sadducees generally remained loyal to the Hasmoneans.

Hasmonean Kingdom at its greatest extent under Salome Alexandra

Alexandra proved an able administrator. She expanded the army, maintained peace with neighboring powers, and managed foreign affairs prudently; she sent a force to defend allies in Damascus from the Itureans and concluded diplomatic understandings with Tigranes of Armenia who conquered much of Syria and besieged Acre. Her governance preserved internal stability and prosperity, and even hostile sources acknowledge her administrative competence. Tension within the royal family, however, grew toward the end of her life. Her elder son, Hyrcanus II, served as high priest and was regarded as her heir, while the younger Aristobulus II, more ambitious and militarily inclined, gathered supporters opposed to Pharisaic influence. As Alexandra's health declined, Aristobulus seized control of more than twenty fortresses and their treasuries to raise an army, and declared himself king. His wife and children were detained by the queen in Jerusalem's Baris fortress. Alexandra died soon afterward at the age of 73, leaving her sons' rivalry to plunge Judea back into civil war.

=== Civil war and Roman conquest (67–63 BCE) ===
After Alexandra's death, Aristobulus defeated Hyrcanus near Jericho and seized power in Judea. Antipater the Idumaean warned Hyrcanus he was at risk, prompting him to flee to the Nabataean kingdom and return with Aretas III's army to besiege Aristobulus in Jerusalem. Both brothers then appealed to Aulus Scaurus, one of Pompey's officers; Scaurus backed Aristobulus, ordered the Nabataeans to withdraw, and Aristobulus exploited their retreat to defeat Hyrcanus. When Pompey arrived in Damascus, he met with delegations from Hyrcanus and Aristobulus. Hyrcanus claimed the throne as the lawful heir by primogeniture and charged Aristobulus with fomenting wars and piracy. Aristobulus replied that he had taken the kingship out of necessity, since his elder brother was unfit to hold it. According to Josephus and Diodorus Siculus, a third delegation representing "the Jewish nation" also appeared, demanding the abolition of monarchy and the restoration of priestly rule.

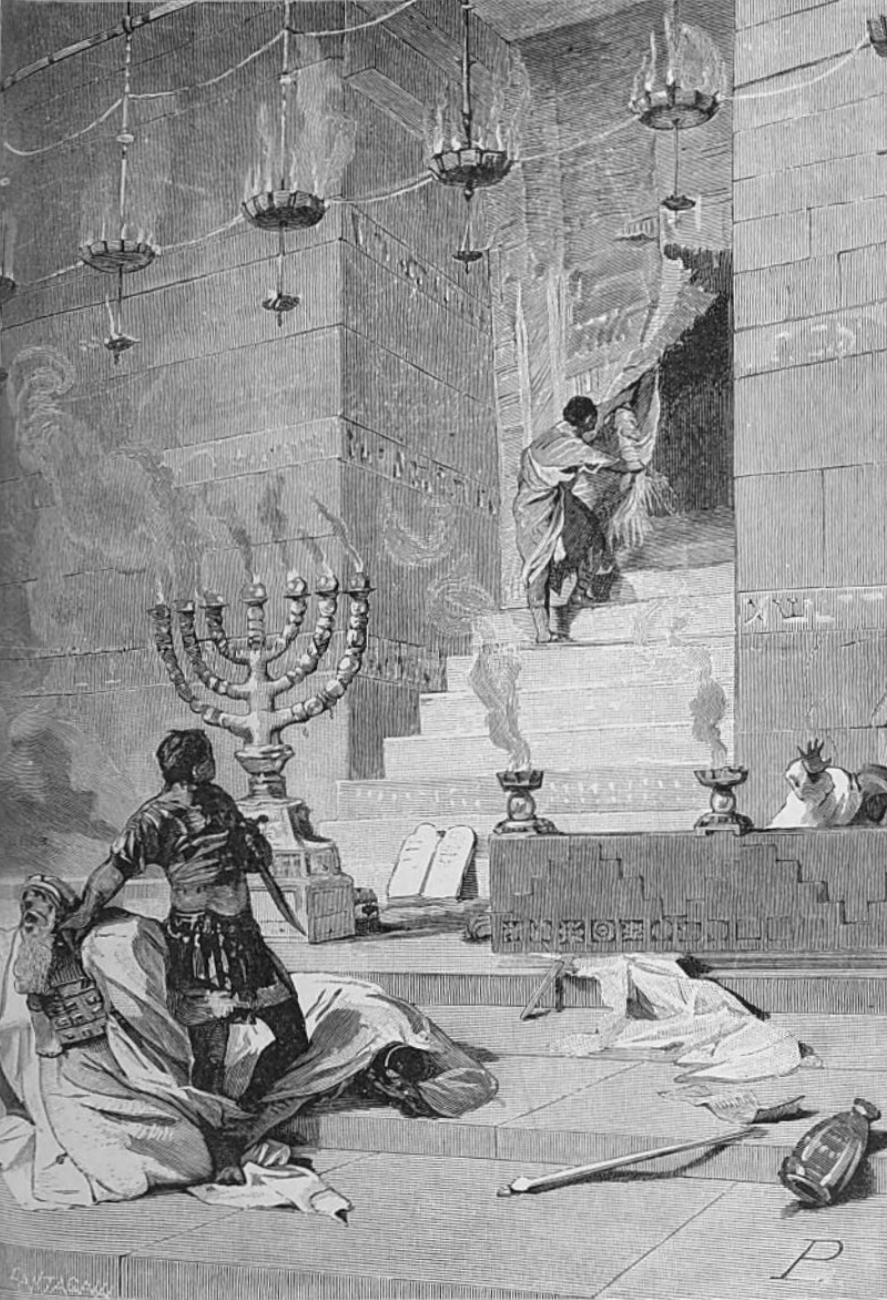
Pompey in the Holy of Holies of the Jerusalem Temple, drawing by Lodovico Pogliaghi (1883)

Pompey deferred a final decision and moved to enter the country; Aristobulus, having paid a large bribe, began defensive measures and withdrew to Jerusalem. Pompey advanced as far as Jericho; Aristobulus met him and promised money and entry, but Aristobulus's followers shut the city to the Romans. Aristobulus opponents opened the gates while his supporters seized the Temple Mount. Pompey besieged it for three months and, taking advantage of the Shabbat to advance siege works, captured the sanctuary. Pompey entered the Temple's Holy of Holies without touching its treasures and ordered the Temple cleansed, and worship resumed the next day. With the Roman conquest in 63 BCE, Judea ceased to be a sovereign kingdom, and did not regain national independence for nearly two millennia.

=== Roman client state (63–40 BCE) ===
Following the Roman conquest, Pompey confirmed Hyrcanus as high priest but not king and took Aristobulus and his sons as captives to Rome. He also reduced Judea's territory, assigning many Hellenistic cities to the province of Syria with polis status, some becoming part of the Decapolis. (Note: The detached cities included Dora, Straton's Tower, Apollonia, Joppa, Azotus, Anthedon, Gaza, Raphia, Ascalon, Maresha, Samaria, Scythopolis, Arethusa, Jamnia, Abila, Hippus, Gadara, Pella and Dium.) Alexander, son of Aristobulus, escaped captivity, rebelled against his uncle Hyrcanus, and quickly seized large swathes of the country. Aulus Gabinius, the Roman governor of Syria, came to Hyrcanus's aid and defeated Alexander after he fortified himself at Alexandrium. Gabinius then reorganized the country and rebuilt many damaged cities, while Hyrcanus again served as high priest. Meanwhile, Aristobulus escaped Roman captivity, returned to Judea, and raised a new revolt, which Gabinius also suppressed. Alexander rebelled again and was again defeated.

In 54 BCE Marcus Crassus assumed the Syrian governorship and plundered the Temple treasury, which the Romans had hitherto left untouched. Soon after, he was killed fighting the Parthians. His successor Cassius, focused on checking the Parthians after Crassus's defeat, seized Tarichaeae in Galilee and enslaved many Jews, and—at Antipater's instigation—executed the turncoat Peitholaus; these actions may have been connected to suppressing a renewed Aristobulan revolt. In 49 BCE civil war broke out between Julius Caesar and Pompey. Caesar prepared to send Aristobulus, then a captive in Rome, back to Judea to wage the war in his interest, but Aristobulus was poisoned by Caesar's enemies before he could depart; Pompey's supporters also killed his son Alexander in Antioch.

After Pompey's defeat and death in Egypt, Caesar took control of the East. After Pompey's death in 48 BCE, Antipater backed Caesar and, by securing Arab and Syrian support, persuading the Jews of the Onias district, and commanding in battle alongside Mithridates of Pergamum, helped the Roman forces take Egypt, earning notice for courage and strategy. Caesar kept Hyrcanus in power in Judea (possibly now with the title "ethnarch"), permitted the rebuilding of Jerusalem's walls ruined by Pompey. He also granted Antipater Roman citizenship and tax exemption, and entrusted him with Judea's administration as "procurator". Caesar reduced the tribute owed by the Hasmoneans in 47 BCE. Many passages depict Hyrcanus as overshadowed by Antipater, though Josephus is inconsistent and other evidence shows Hyrcanus retained some agency. Around 44 BCE, Antipater's son Phasael became governor of Jerusalem, and his other son, Herod, governor of the Galilee, where he crushed a revolt with extrajudicial killings; when leading Jews pressed charges against Herod, Roman governor Sextus Caesar intervened and the case was dropped.

In 44 BCE Julius Caesar was assassinated and civil war resumed in Rome. Cassius came to the region to raise troops and funds for war against Octavian and Mark Antony, levying 700 talents from Judea. Herod delivered Galilee's quota and gained favor. His father Antipater was then poisoned by Malichus, a Jewish aristocrat; Herod then had Malichus executed. Later he also suppressed a revolt against Phasael. Antigonus, son of Aristobulus, rebelled in the Galilee with Tyrian aid but was defeated by Herod. After these successes Herod was betrothed to Hyrcanus's granddaughter, the Hasmonean princess Mariamne. In 42 BCE, Antony and Octavian defeated Cassius and Brutus at Philippi. When Antony arrived in the East, Jewish envoys accused Herod and Phasael of ruling with Hyrcanus as a puppet; Antony instead confirmed the brothers as tetrarchs, and had troops kill many from one of the delegations.

=== Antigonus Mattathias (40–37 BCE) and the rise of Herod ===
In 40 BCE the Parthian Empire seized the Levant from the Romans. The Parthians restored Hasmonean rule by installing Antigonus Mattathias as king of Judea for a large bribe he promised. He and the Parthians besieged Jerusalem, lured Phasael and Hyrcanus into their hands, and captured them. Phasael committed suicide; Hyrcanus was spared but Antigonus cut off his ears to disqualify him from the high priesthood. Meanwhile, Herod escaped Jerusalem by night, reached Idumaea after a pursuit, secured refuge for his family in Masada, and later sailed to Rome. Antigonus became the last Hasmonean king to rule Judea.

In late 40 BCE Herod reached Rome, where Antony and Octavian presented him before the Senate, which declared him king of Judea. Early in 39 BCE Herod landed in Galilee and began his war for the throne. He secured Antony's backing, and the Roman general Sosius brought forces to assist. In Herod's absence Antigonus won several victories, and Herod's brother Joseph was killed. In 37 BCE Herod, with Sosius, defeated Antigonus's forces and besieged Jerusalem, which fell that summer. Herod's effective reign over Judea thus began, and the Hasmonean state came to an end.

In the following years many Hasmonean descendants were eliminated. Herod appointed Mariamne's brother Aristobulus III as high priest; when the adolescent became too popular, Herod had him drowned by his servants at his Jericho palace. Hyrcanus, who had been in Babylonia after Parthian captivity, was enticed back by Herod and later executed. In 29–28 BCE, Mariamne was executed amid court intrigues, and her mother Alexandra was put to death after a suspected bid for power during Herod's illness. Lastly, in 7 BCE Herod also executed his two sons by Mariamne, Alexander and Aristobulus IV, after being persuaded that they, too, conspired against him. Much of the former Hasmonean realm was later organized as the Roman province of Judaea in the early first century CE.

== Politics ==
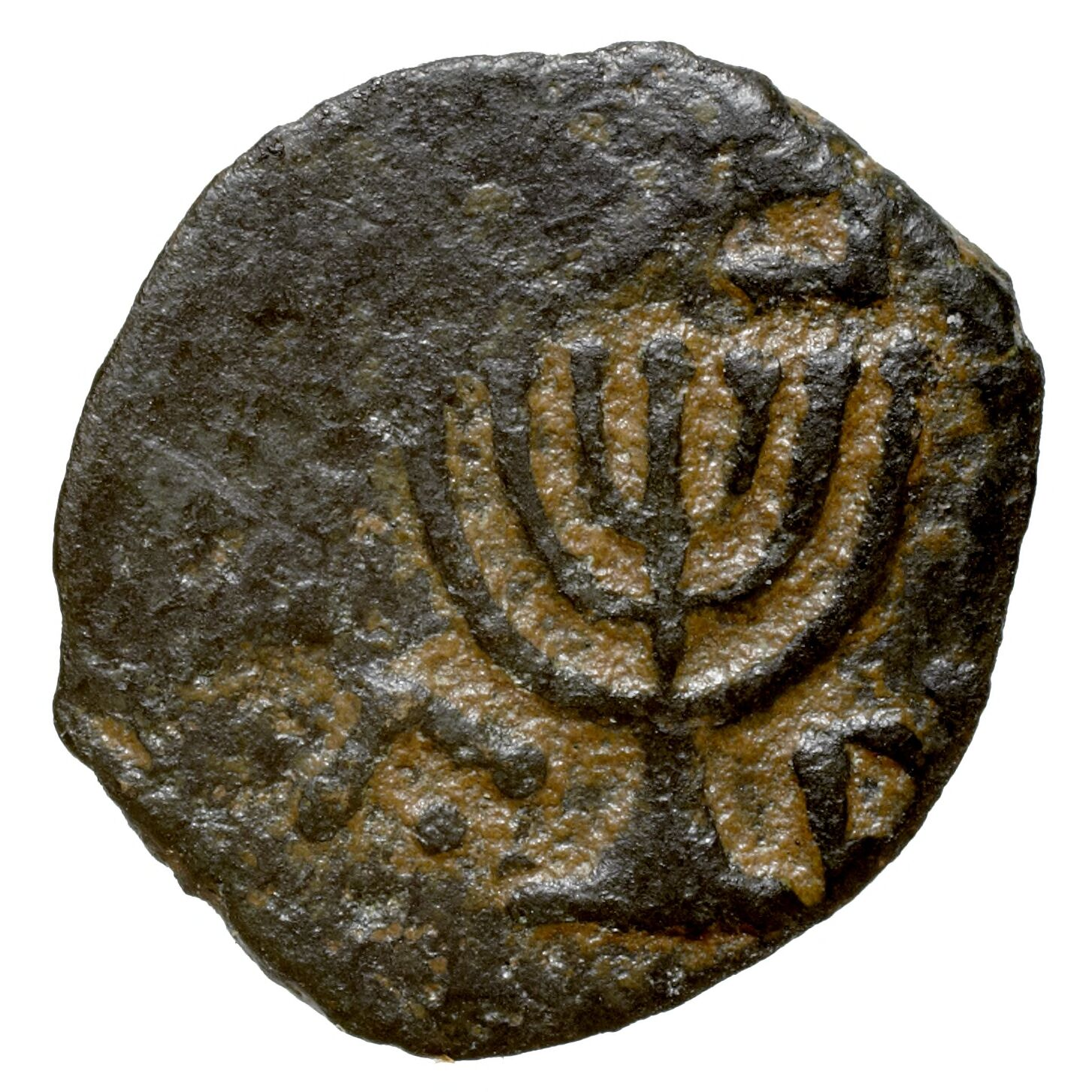
Coin of Antigonus II Mattathias, the last Hasmonean king of Judea (r. 40–37 BC)

Under Hasmonean rule, Judea functioned as a theocratic monarchy centered in Jerusalem. The regime styled the polity with names derived from "Judah." The government combined religious and civil authority: the head of state also served as High Priest of the Jerusalem Temple, holding supreme power over both governance and worship. Initially, the Hasmonean rulers exercised authority as hereditary high priests and national leaders (ethnarchs), but as their sovereignty consolidated, they adopted the title of kings (basileus). This fusion of kingship and priesthood was unprecedented in earlier Jewish tradition; during the biblical Kingdom of Judah, the monarchy belonged to the Davidic line of the tribe of Judah, while the high priesthood remained a separate institution. Their claim to the high priesthood itself drew criticism, since although the Hasmoneans were priests descended from Aaron, they were not regarded as belonging to the Zadokite line that traced its descent from him and, according to tradition, had held the office since the time of David and Solomon.

According to historian Daniel R. Schwartz, adopting the royal title served several purposes. Externally, it clarified the Hasmoneans' standing vis-à-vis their non-Jewish subjects, who could scarcely be subordinated to a purely religious office like the high priest without forced conversion, and with foreign powers, enabling them to present themselves "as kings among kings" in diplomacy. Internally, the secular connotations of kingship allowed an accommodation with the Sadducean aristocracy that resented the displacement of the sons of Zadok from the high priesthood: they could accept the Hasmoneans as heads of a secular monarchy while continuing to dispute their claim to the highest priestly office.

Historian Eyal Regev argues that Hasmonean demands strengthened Jewish self-perception along both ethnic and religious lines, sharpening the distinction between Jews and non-Jews. In his view, this involved building up and cultivating collective elements already rooted in the Hebrew Bible. He holds that their construction of a collective identity drew on biblical tradition, the Land of Israel, and the memory of the Davidic kingship. In his view, Hasmonean ideology tied the rulers and their institutional power to the Jewish people, expressed through elements such as Hanukkah, which he interprets as an invented tradition in Hobsbawm's sense, serving in effect as a Hasmonean independence day, coinage invoking the ḥeḇer of the Jews, and the Hasmoneans' self-presentation as religious leaders of the Jews ruling in the people's name.

== Jerusalem ==
=== Urban growth and construction projects ===
With the establishment of Hasmonean rule, Jerusalem gained markedly in importance as the royal capital. Magen Broshi estimates a population of 30,000–35,000 for this period. The city expanded onto the Western (southwestern) Hill (roughly today's Mount Zion and the Jewish and Armenian Quarters of the Old City) for the first time since Nebuchadnezzar's destruction of Jerusalem in 587/6 BCE. The late–8th-century BCE fortification there, ruined since 587/586, was repaired and rebuilt; surviving segments (e.g., at the Tower of David citadel) show late Hellenistic masonry with alternating headers and stretchers and drafted margins with rough bosses, a line many identify with Josephus's "First Wall." The city's entire fortified area—the southeastern hill, the Temple Mount, and the southwestern hill—covered about 650 dunams (≈160 acres), similar to the city's extent on the eve of the Babylonian conquest.

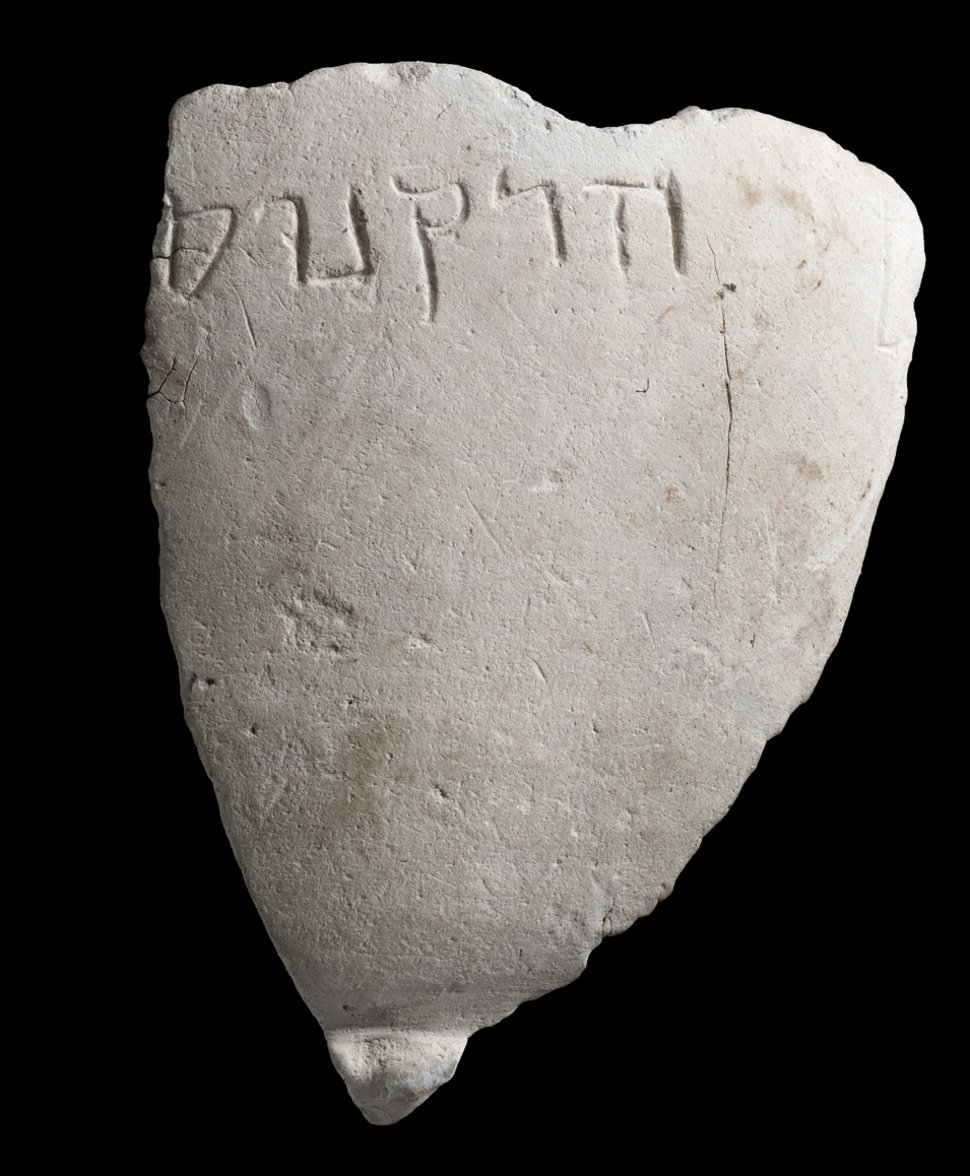
Stone bowl fragment inscribed "Hyrcanus," found in the Givati Parking Lot, Jerusalem.

Archaeologist Joseph Patrich and architect Marcos Edelcopp propose that the Temple Mount precinct was enlarged under John Hyrcanus, growing southward and eastward until it reached 500 × 500 cubits (roughly 262 × 262 meters), the dimensions later recorded in the Mishnah. They attribute this expansion to an ideological wish to fulfill Ezekiel's vision of the Temple, as well as to accommodate a growing number of pilgrims. A masonry seam in the Temple Mount's eastern wall marks Herodian work to the south, while stones north of the seam are often dated to the Hellenistic period, possibly Hasmonean.

Hyrcanus I is also known to have built the Baris citadel, a fortified palace overlooking the Temple from the north, beyond the city walls. Josephus mentions another Hasmonean palace on a high point of the southwestern hill overlooking the city and Temple Mount.

To meet growing demand, the Hasmoneans built a c. 21.5 km low-level aqueduct from Solomon's Pools to Jerusalem, feeding large cisterns on the Temple Mount; sections remained in use into the Ottoman and Mandate periods.

=== Hinterland development ===
To support this urban growth and the expanding needs of the capital and the Temple, Jerusalem's immediate rural hinterland underwent state-directed development. Spatial analysis (GIS) indicates that the number of agricultural production sites within a 10 km radius (a two-hour walk) of the Temple Mount nearly doubled, growing from 15 to 29 settlements. This supply network was closely integrated into the capital's fiscal administration, with 38% of these rural sites yielding storage jars bearing paleo-Hebrew yršlm (Jerusalem) and yhdt (Judea) stamp impressions. Furthermore, to satisfy strict Temple purity regulations, 44% of these farmsteads featured rock-cut miqva'ot (ritual baths) built directly adjacent to winepresses and olive presses, ensuring ritual purity from the moment of extraction. Large columbaria (dove-raising installations) were also maintained at 27% of these rural complexes to supply the massive urban and cultic demand for sacrificial birds generated by pilgrims visiting the capital.

== Architecture ==
Hasmonean royal architecture was rooted in the Hellenistic tradition, and specifically inspired by Alexandrian styles. Their complexes included colonnaded courtyards, distyle in antis entrances, triclinia and reception halls, and at Jericho also swimming pools and garden pavilions, thereby placing them within the broader tradition of Hellenistic royal palaces in the eastern Mediterranean. In the case of the pavilion in Jannaeus's pool complex at Jericho, archaeologist Orit Peleg-Barkat notes that its plan derives from the tradition of Persian palace gardens, even though its column decoration is Greek. It was possibly inspired by Ptolemy I's palace at Alexandria, which is thought to have drawn on Persian styles that Ptolemy encountered during his campaigns with Alexander the Great. At the palaces of Jericho, Cypros, and Alexandrium, the Doric order predominates in courtyards and at the entrances to important rooms, while the more elaborate and costly Corinthian capitals were apparently used in the most prestigious spaces.

The adoption of Hellenistic architectural styles did not, however, entail the abandonment of Jewish norms. Hasmonean palace complexes reflect adherence to Jewish law, among other things through ritual baths, stone vessels, and the avoidance of figural art.

In the subsequent Herodian period, these architectural traditions were further developed. Whereas Hasmonean decoration had been concentrated in a relatively limited number of representative spaces, Herodian construction displayed greater richness and variety and an increasingly pronounced Roman influence.

For military architecture, see #Fortifications.

== Funerary practices and architecture ==
Rock-cut family tombs, common in Iron Age Judah, reappeared under the Hasmoneans as elite presence in Jerusalem increased. Ancient sources describe a now-lost mausoleum built by Simon at Modi'in—a monumental family tomb with seven pyramids—likely inspired by the Mausoleum at Halicarnassus; this model influenced later mausoleum-style memorials in Judea, and Jerusalem tombs adopted kokhim (burial niches; also known as loculi), Greek-style porches, and pyramidal or other markers that remained standard through the Second Temple period. Later Hasmonean rulers were no longer buried at Modi'in; Josephus indicates that both Hyrcanus and Jannaeus were interred in Jerusalem.

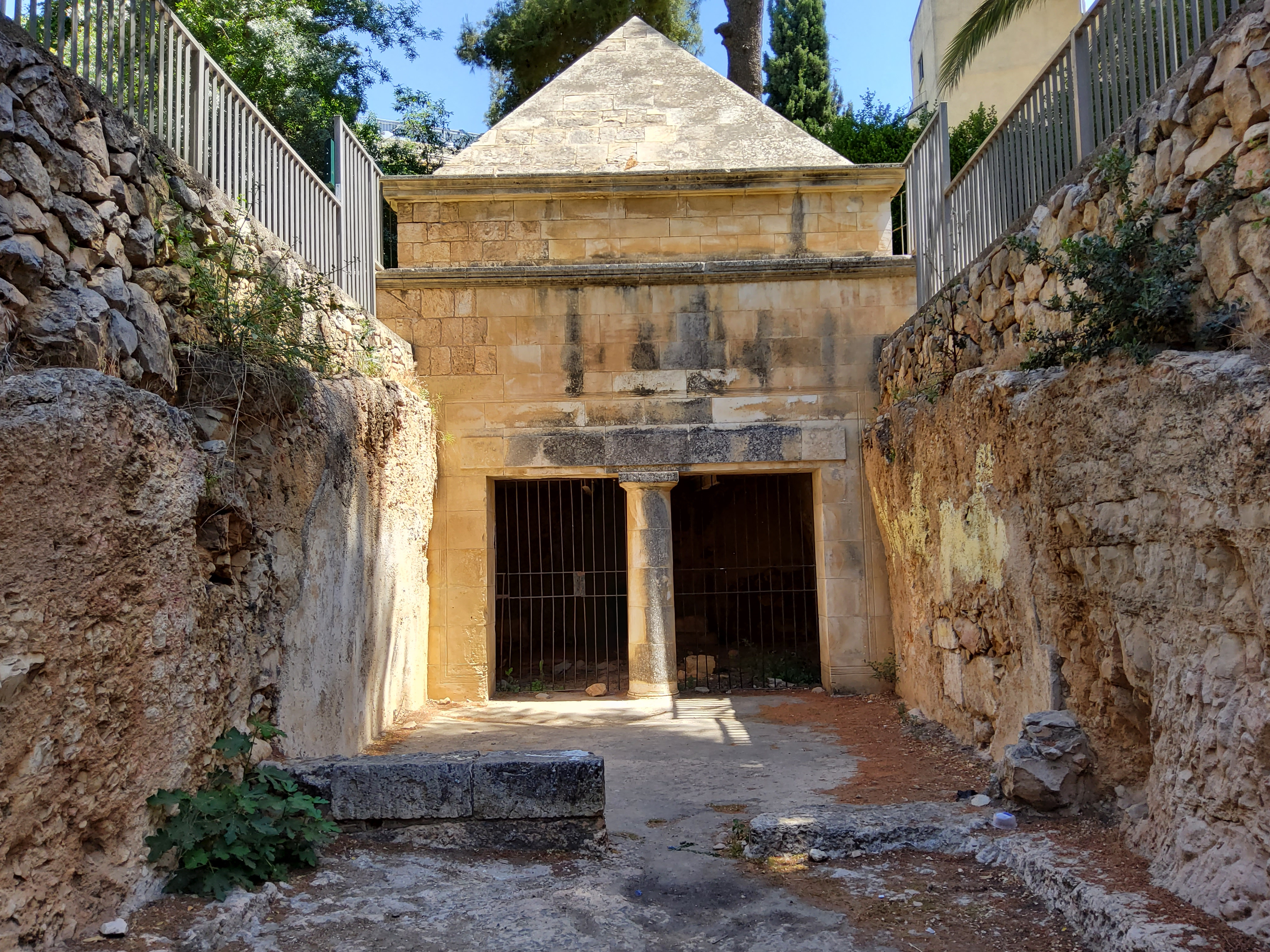
Jason's Tomb, a Hasmonean-era rock-cut tomb in Rehavia, Jerusalem

Evidence for Hasmonean-period burial architecture in Jerusalem has also been preserved. One notable discovery is Jason's Tomb, discovered west of ancient Jerusalem in the modern Jerusalemite neighborhood of Rehavia. It is a rock-cut family tomb with a Doric in-antis porch and a pyramid nefesh above; its chambers include some of the earliest Jewish kokim in Jerusalem. Porch graffiti in Aramaic and one in Greek mention "Jason" and depict a stag, five seven-branched menorahs, and three ships (one seemingly pursuing the others). The scale, iconography, and onomastics suggest a high-status, likely priestly family reflecting Hellenistic influence.

== Religious developments ==
The Hasmonean era saw the crystallization of several notable Jewish sects—Pharisees, Sadducees, and Essenes—alongside disputes over authority and law. Josephus first mentions the Pharisees and Sadducees in connection with the era of Jonathan Maccabee, though that mention does not prove they already existed then. In Josephus, their first clear historical activity appears under John Hyrcanus (135–104 BCE), where the two groups appear as political rivals. The Sadducees, linked to the priestly aristocracy, held more literal interpretations of the Torah, believed in free will, and were often aligned with the Hasmonean rulers. In contrast, the Pharisees believed in both free will and fate and sought to shape Jewish practice through an oral law that supplemented the written Torah. According to Josephus, they were the most popular among the Jewish population. They eventually attained significant political influence during the reign of Salome Alexandra.

The Essenes, attested from about 100 BCE and first linked to the reign of Aristobulus I (104–103 BCE), were the most separatist of the three. They withdrew from mainstream society, adhering to strict purity laws, holding a different calendar, and holding apocalyptic beliefs. If Qumran was indeed the site of an Essene community, as most scholars believe, their sectarian texts found in nearby caves shed light on their emergence. These texts reveal that the Essenes saw themselves as a righteous remnant from "Aaron and Israel"; led by the "Teacher of Righteousness," an unknown priest, they were determined to reject the corruption of their time, which they described as an "age of wrath." This period of moral decay saw the rise of a "Wicked Priest" (who scholars identify with the Hasmonean leader Jonathan), whom they believed had defiled himself and the cult and persecuted the righteous, before being killed by his enemies. Their commentary on Nahum refers to "the furious young lion," a brutal leader identified with Alexander Jannaeus, who is said to have persecuted the "seekers of smooth things," probably referring to his conflict with the Pharisees.

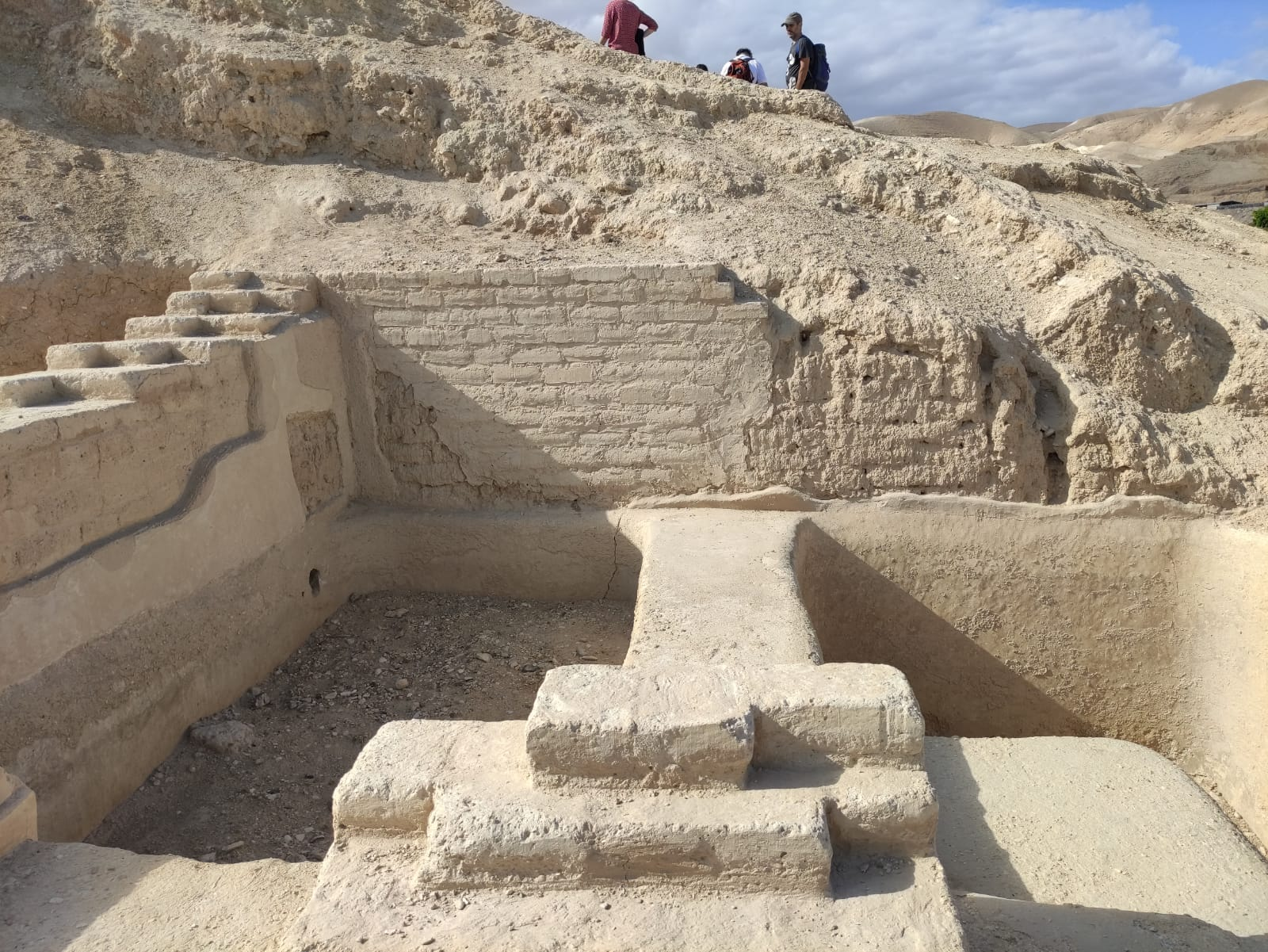
Mikveh (Jewish ritual bath) at the Hasmonean royal winter palaces near Jericho

During the Hasmonean period, observance of biblical purity laws seem to have intensified in public life. From the late 2nd–early 1st century BCE, ritual baths (miqva'ot) appear across Judea (with a dense concentration in and around Jerusalem) indicating wider, more regular purity practice beyond the Temple cult; typical installations are rock-cut or sunken, stepped, plastered and filled with undrawn rain or spring water, and Hasmonean-period examples are attested near the Temple Mount and on the southwestern hill.

== Language, literature and dynastic names ==
=== Language ===
Since late in the 19th century, many scholars argued that there was an increase in the use of Hebrew language during the Hasmonean period. Indeed this idea finds both literary and archaeological support in recent scholarship.

=== Literature ===
During the Hasmonean period, a significant body of literature developed; some of which has survived to the present day. This includes historiographical works, such as 1 Maccabees and 2 Maccabees. Religious apocalyptic literature also flourished, including the Book of Daniel, Book of Dream Visions, and also the Maccabees books, of which the former is apocalyptic and the latter is partially apocalyptic. Additionally, various other forms of religious literature were produced, addressing themes of ethics, law, and lifestyle. Notable examples include the Testaments of the Twelve Patriarchs and the Book of Jubilees, the latter of which presents a retelling of historical events from the creation of the world to the Exodus, purportedly dictated by an angel to Moses.

=== Dynastic names ===
Historian and lexicographer Tal Ilan has shown that in Judea, from the Hasmonean period to about 200 CE, Hasmonean dynastic names were the single most common cluster of given names.

== Military ==
=== Tactics and troops ===
The Hasmonean military evolved from guerilla origins into a standing army modeled partially on Hellenistic lines. During the Maccabean revolt, Judah Maccabee's forces were ad hoc bands of rebel fighters; but by the time of Jonathan and Simon, these had coalesced into a more regular force able to face Seleucid armies in the field. By 140 BCE the regime kept a standing army of paid garrisons and regular units, including a royal bodyguard, which was augmented by general mobilization. The Hasmonean rulers maintained a core Jewish infantry but increasingly supplemented them with foreign mercenaries. John Hyrcanus is the first attested employer of foreign troops (probably c. 130s BCE); Alexander Jannaeus reportedly hired Pisidian, Cilician, and Greek contingents to bolster his forces. Overall, historian Israel Shatzman argues Hasmonean field armies on major campaigns numbered roughly 20,000–50,000.

The Hasmonean army incorporated Hellenistic tactics and siege craft, evidenced by their use of siege engines to capture fortified cities.

=== Territory control through strongholds ===
The Hasmoneans also fortifyied key positions in their own realm. A fortification program was already underway under Simon, who strengthened a series of sites across Judea. The fortress of Artabba was probably constructed during his reign and appears to have served as a northern outpost of Judea following the annexation of the districts of Ephraim, Lod and Ramathaim. Together with Adida (Tel Hadid), and possibly with other fortified sites such as Gezer, Dok-Dagon and Thamna, it may have formed part of a wide system intended to consolidate Hasmonean control over the area. Simon's son, John Hyrcanus, constructed the Baris citadel of the Temple Mount in Jerusalem, and he may also have established Hyrcania in the Judaean Desert—though the latter could have been built or rebuilt by his successors. Arumah (near Aqraba) was probably established after Hyrcanus's conquest of central Samaria, either late in his reign or under his successor Alexander Jannaeus.

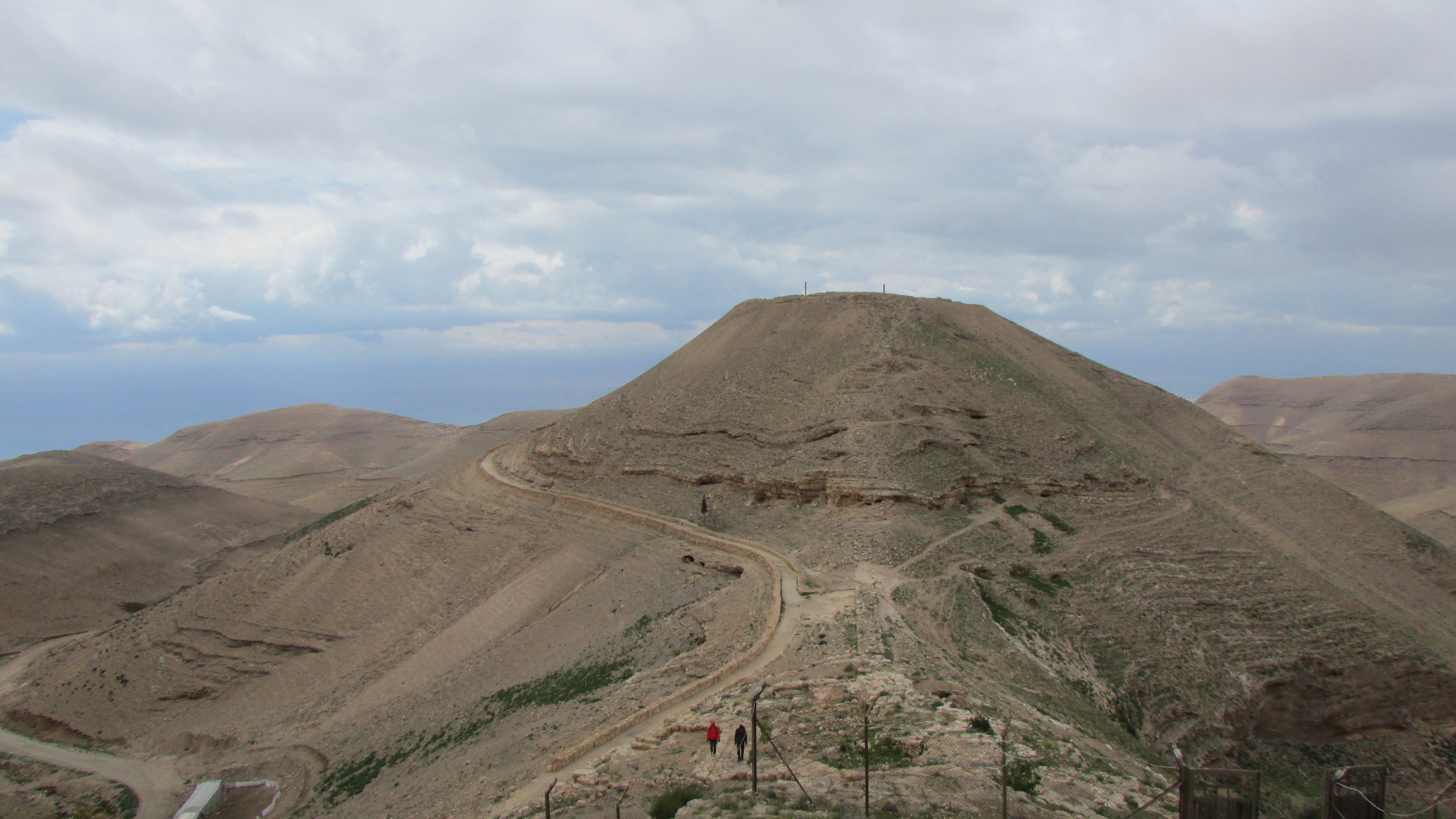
Machaerus, a Hasmonean fortress east of the Dead Sea, built by Alexander Jannaeus c. 90 BC and later rebuilt by Herod

Jannaeus built a defense line at the kingdom's eastern borders, including the major forts of Alexandrium (overlooking the Jordan Valley) and Machaerus (east of the Dead Sea). The Hasmoneans also established smaller strongholds along the kingdom's frontiers to secure strategic routes and project military power, and maintain a visible presence in contested border zones. One example is Mudayna as-Saliya, situated on the kingdom's southeastern frontier near the Desert Highway in Transjordan, a major route connecting Petra, Philadelphia, and Damascus. The site’s existence suggests a more fluid boundary with the Nabatean kingdom and indicates that Hasmonean influence may have extended farther than previously thought. Comparable frontier installations are attested along the kingdom's northwestern boundary, including Khirbet Rushmiyah (in Haifa) and Qeren Naftali (in Upper Galilee). Another northwestern example is Horvat Tefen in the western Galilee, a short-lived fortress founded during the reign of Jannaeus overlooking Acre and apparently intended to monitor, and exert pressure on, this rival Phoenician city.

==== Fortifications ====
The Hasmoneans fortified or rebuilt the walls of several cities:

- Jerusalem's First Wall was their foremost city fortification project
- Jaffa, the crucial trade port of the Hasmonean kingdim
- Gezer
- Beth-Zur, strategic border city guarding the approach from Idumea to Jerusalem through the Judean Hills

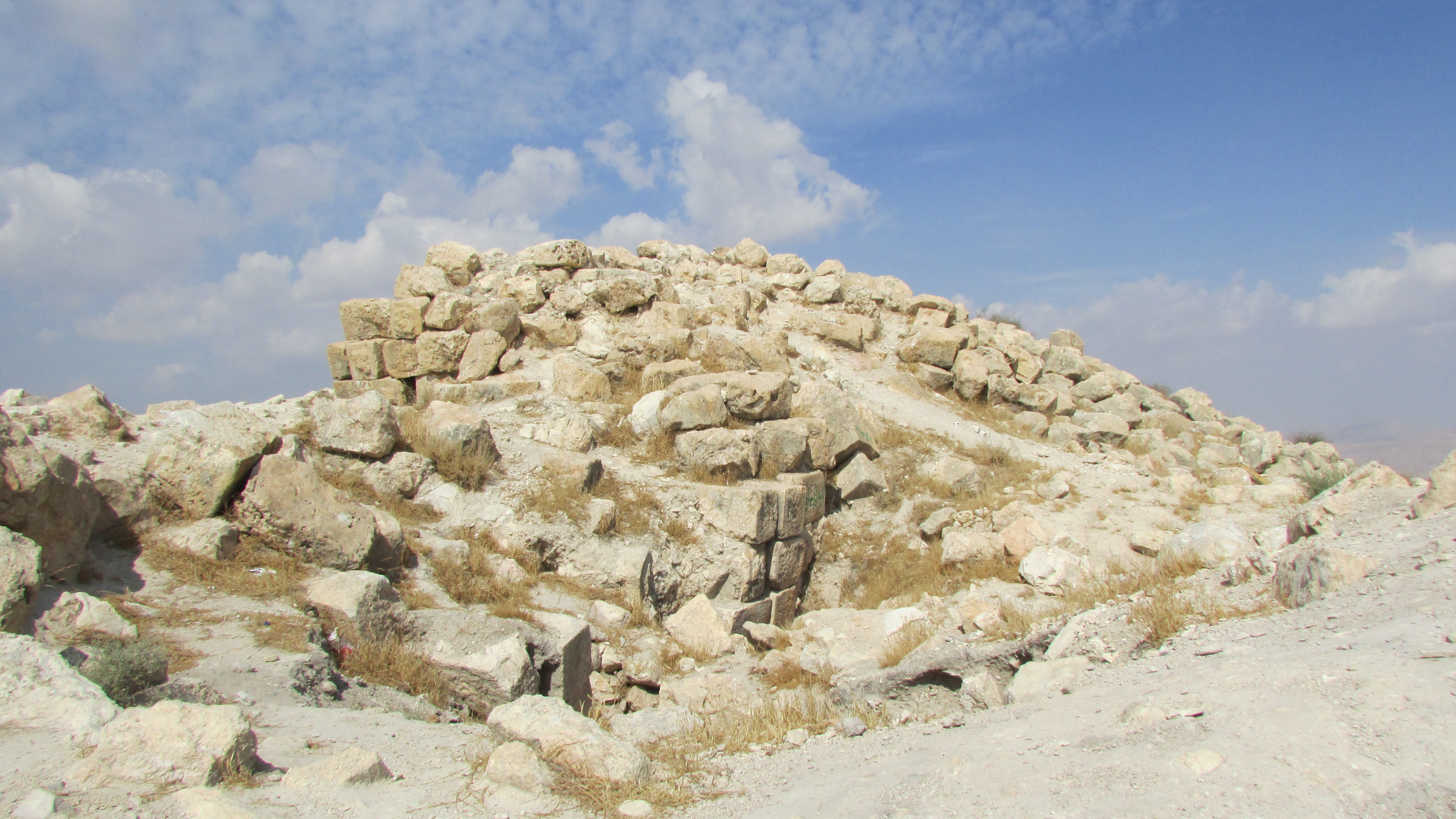
The remains of the Alexandrium (Sartaba) fortress built by Alexander Jannaeus

A specific type of structure from this period is the Hasmonean desert fortress, which created an interlocking border defense system, mainly located in the Judaean desert (thus the term), although there are some exceptions with fortresses built in non-arid areas.

- Alexandreion, overlooking the Jordan Valley
- Dok (also Dagon) on the mount overlooking Jericho
- Khirbet Mudayna as-Saliya in Transjordan, at the boundary between the (eastern) desert and the (western) sown
- Machaerus, east of the Dead Sea
- Hyrcania, in the Judaean desert
- Threx and Taurus,, two twin forts, one of them preceding the Herodian palace-fortress of Cypros, both uphill from the winter palaces at Jericho

Masada: although Josephus claims that it was first fortified by Alexander Jannaeus, as of 2001 no Hasmonean-period building remains could be identified during archaeological excavations there.

Similar hilltop fortresses outside the desert area:

- Adida (ancient name; Tel Hadid), on the border of the northern Shephelah and the southwestern foothills of Samaria, where as of 2020 the large Hellenistic fortifications could not yet be attributed to either the Seleucids, the Hasmoneans, possibly belonging to both.
- Artabba, Hasmonean-Herodian fortress in south-west Samaria, on the West Bank
- Arumah (Khirbet el-'Ormeh), Hasmonean-Herodian fortress in the central Samarian Mountains, West Bank
- Horvat Tefen, Hasmonean fortress securing the northwest border against nearby Acre

A chain of fortified outposts and maritime installations stood along the Dead Sea coast. North to south along the western shore:

- Rujm el-Bahr, a fortified maritime anchorage and checkpoint
- Qumran, Hasmonean military outpost or fort
- Khirbet Mazin (Me[t]zad Qidron) from the southern part of 'Ein Feshkha nature reserve, Hasmonean fortress serving as an anchorage for ships
- Ein el-Ghuweir ('Enot Samar), floor, describeb by Yizhar Hirschfeld as a fortified Hasmonean- and Herodian-period estate
- Qasr et-Turabeh (Metzad Samar) at Ein et-Turabeh ('Enot Qaneh), Hasmonean lookout tower or fortified roadside station, similar to the one at Qumran
- Ein Gedi, large Hasmonean fortress or citadel on Tel Goren (Level III)

Similar structures elsewhere:

- Magdala on the Sea of Galilee: archaeologists presume that the tower remains they found in the harbour are of a Hasmonean lookout tower, much like those around the Dead Sea, at Rujm el-Bahr, Khirbat Mazin and Qasr et-Turabeh.

== Foreign policy ==
=== Expansionism ===
The Hasmoneans pursued a policy of expansion, gradually extending their rule beyond the traditional borders of Judea. Historian Uriel Rappaport situated this expansion within both the pattern of dynastic expansionism common among Hellenistic-era dynasties and a distinctively Jewish national, religious, and historical framework. He notes that during this period, post-Seleucid states throughout the Near East, including the Nabataean Kingdom, the Parthian Empire, and the Kingdom of Armenia, pursued territorial enlargement both as an expression of dynastic power and as a means of exploiting economic opportunities. The Hasmonean case, however, also bore a uniquely Jewish character: their conquests were carried out largely within the borders of the historical Land of Israel of the First Temple period and were accompanied by policies aimed at Judaizing conquered populations.

Rappaport also argued that Simon's statement in 1 Maccabees, "we have not taken a foreign land... but only the inheritance of our ancestors", whether authentic to Simon himself or formulated later by the book's author, expresses with unusual clarity a Jewish national identity. While the Jewish claim to the Land of Israel typically emerges from biblical tradition, Rappaport notes that Simon's argument is striking precisely because it rests not on theology but on ancestral connection. It thus differs from both the dominant biblical emphasis on divine promise and from the Hellenistic concept of conquest-based rule, the "right of the spear", through which dynasties without ethnic ties justified their authority over conquered territories. Judea, by contrast, is presented as a national polity grounded in the people's longstanding bond with their ancestral land. Rappaport connects this to Simon's emphasis on popular assemblies that ratified Hasmonean rule, suggesting he derived his legitimacy not merely from military success or dynastic right, but from the people of Judea themselves. The omission of any divine promise is itself significant, especially given that the work was written for a Jewish audience, indicating that Jewish claims to the land could be framed in historical, rather than solely theological, terms.

=== Relations with Rome ===
A distinctive feature of Hasmonean diplomacy was the effort to secure formal relations with Rome. This policy appears to have begun under Judah Maccabee, who sent the first embassy to Rome in 161 BCE, seeking an alliance of friendship. His successors Jonathan and Simon renewed these contacts, and John Hyrcanus later confirmed the treaty. Subsequent rulers, however, do not seem to have maintained active relations with Rome. Although Roman support was occasionally cited as benefiting Judea's position, as historian Lester L. Grabbe notes, Rome rarely intervened unless its own interests were involved, offering only letters of goodwill or symbolic gestures. For the Hasmoneans, such alliances served mainly to bolster internal legitimacy rather than deter foreign enemies.

== Economy ==
=== Administrative stamp impressions ===
Prior to and alongside the widespread adoption of independent coinage, the Hasmonean state utilized a centralized administrative and fiscal system characterized by stamp impressions on the handles of local agricultural storage jars. Two distinct types of administrative stamps are archaeologically documented: yhdt (Judea) and yršlm (Jerusalem). The yršlm stamps feature five letters in archaic paleo-Hebrew script arranged between the outer points of a pentagram. Like the revived script on later Hasmonean coinage, these administrative stamps deliberately employed the older paleo-Hebrew lettering rather than the contemporary square script.

Archaeologists Joseph Spiezer, Yehiel Zelinger and Boaz Zissu date the implementation of this system to the second half of the second century BCE, identifying its development with the consolidation of Hasmonean rule and the renewal of Jerusalem's administrative status under Simon Thasi. The widespread distribution of these stamped jar handles throughout the agricultural hinterland of the capital indicates a highly organized, sophisticated system of state-directed taxation and commodities management. Scholars note that this administrative system shares typological and functional parallels with the state-sponsored LMLK stamp networks of Iron Age Judah. The practice of stamping jar handles appears to have been relatively short-lived, ceasing during the subsequent reign of John Hyrcanus I as the state transitioned toward a fully numismatic-based fiscal economy.

=== Coinage ===
Scholars broadly agree that John Hyrcanus was the first Hasmonean to mint coins, likely beginning after Seleucid authority waned with Antiochus VII's death in 129 BCE. The Seleucids reportedly granted his father Simon minting rights in the 130s, though he appears not to have used them. All Hasmonean issues are small, low-value bronze prutot; no Hasmonean silver is known. High-value payments continued to use circulating silver such as Tyrian tetradrachms, with roughly 672 prutot to one Tyrian tetradrachm. Alexander Jannaeus likely struck millions of bronze prutot, which stayed in circulation into the first century CE. In the archaeological record, coins minted by Alexander Jannaeus constitute the vast majority of numismatic finds at rural agrarian and estate sites surrounding Jerusalem, serving as a primary chronological indicator for the peak period of Hasmonean economic and regional expansion.

The coins regularly name the reigning Hasmonean and his title. Legends appear in both Greek and Hebrew; For the Hebrew legends, the Hasmoneans revived the older paleo-Hebrew script, even though the square Hebrew script still in use today was already the dominant form in their time. Archaeologist Jodi Magness suggests this choice "likely was an allusion to the revived biblical kingdom of David and Solomon." Over time the titulature broadens: Hyrcanus I uses Hebrew name and Jewish titles (High Priest etc.), while under Jannaeus both Hebrew and Greek names appear and the Greek royal title basileus is added, with inscriptions in paleo-Hebrew, Greek, and Aramaic.

Many Hasmonean coins follow the Hebrew formula "X the High Priest and the ḥeḇer of the Judeans." The term ḥeḇer, attested in issues from the 120s BCE to 37 BCE and meaning "association," is debated: it may denote a national council (possibly a Sanhedrin precursor) or the Jewish people/community (as the Hebrew equivalent of the Greek ethnos). According to David Goodblatt, the legends may indicate that "the Judeans" served as the state's internal Hebrew name, in contrast to later First Jewish Revolt and Bar Kokhba coinage that uses "Israel" instead.

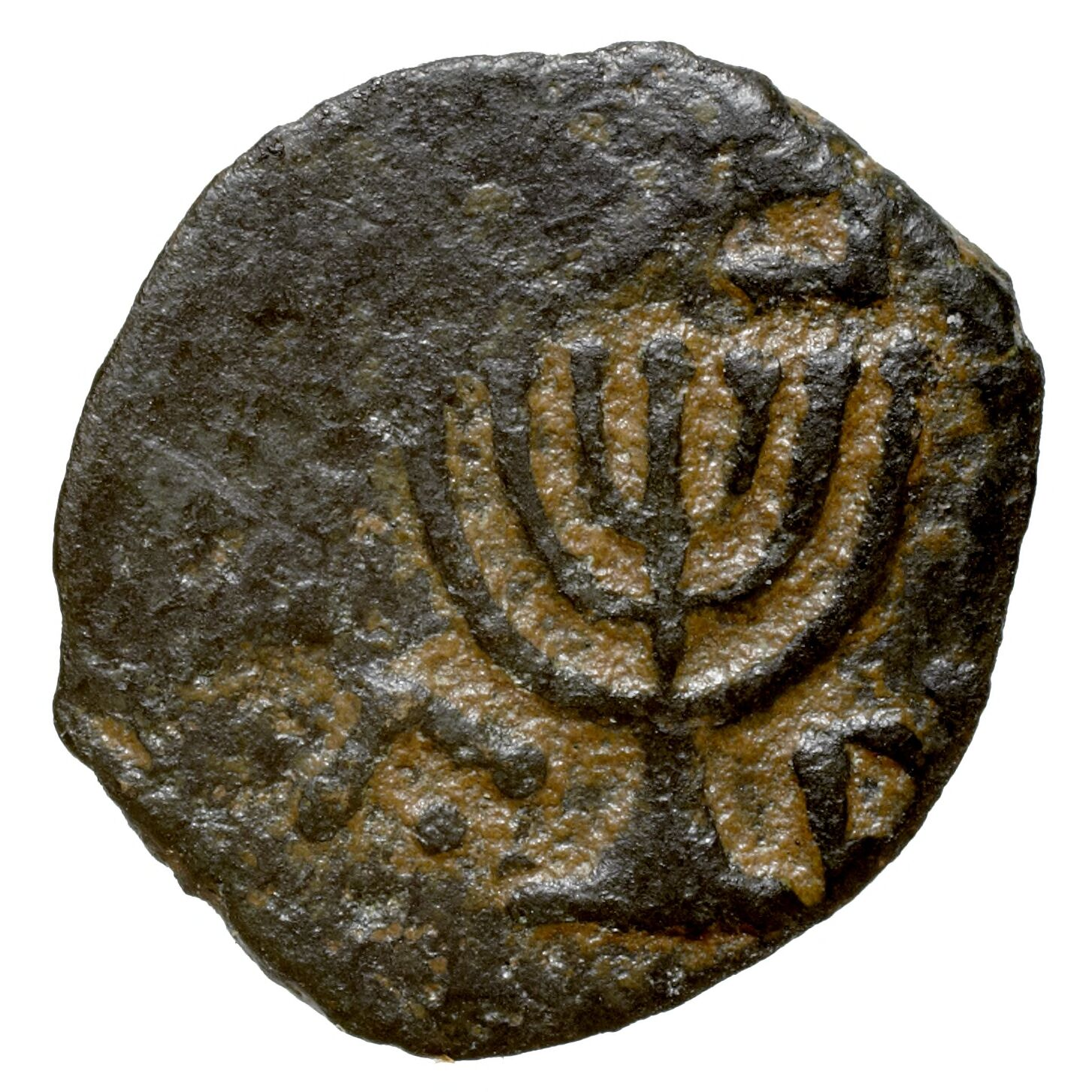
The temple menorah on a coin issued by Antigonus II Mattathias (r. 40–37 BCE)

Hasmonean issues eschew portraits and other figured images, reflecting a growing trend toward aniconism consistent with stricter readings of the Second Commandment; instead they adopt Hellenistic coin types: diadems for royal authority, wreaths and anchors for victory, and cornucopiae for prosperity. Some coins bear symbols linked to Jerusalem such as the pomegranate and the lily, while anchors possibly allude to naval successes or major ports. Under Mattathias Antigonus, coins bearing a seven-branched menorah were struck, symbolizing the Jerusalem Temple and Jewish sovereignty; these are among the earliest surviving menorah depictions, paralleled by contemporary graffiti in Jason's Tomb.

== Demographics ==
Under John Hyrcanus, the Hasmoneans expanded their territories beyond the traditional confines of Judea and incorporated non-Jewish areas in the process. 1 Maccabees relates that the non-Jewish inhabitants of Gezer and Joppa were expelled by Simon Thassi, who settled Jews in their place. Coinciding with the account of Josephus, archaeological evidence attests to significant destruction in the urban and rural settlements in Idumaea, Samaria and the coastal cities from the Hasmonean conquests, followed by the resettlement of Jews in the newly conquered territories. Nevertheless, there's evidence that some of the non-Jewish inhabitants stayed in all of the newly conquered areas.

Many sites in Idumaea experienced destruction, including Maresha, Khirbet el-Rasm, Tel Arad, Khirbet 'Uza and possibly Lachish. The lower city of Maresha and Tel Beersheba were soon abandoned, and evidence for an increased Idumaean presence in Egypt suggests some immigrated there. Idumaeans were eventually forcibly proselytized and co-opted into the Jewish nation by John Hyrcanus. Further north, the Galilee received significant Jewish migration from Judea after its conquest, contributing to a 50% increase in settlements, while the pagan population was greatly reduced. By the end of Alexander Jannaeus' reign, the Galilee was also predominantly Jewish. However, unlike John Hyrcanus, Alexander Jannaeus did not compel the non-Jews to assimilate to the Jewish ethnos and permitted minority ethnē to exist within Hasmonean borders, with the exception of Phoenician coastal cities in the north whom Josephus claims he enslaved.

== Legacy ==
=== Jewish nationalism ===
Politically and nationally, the greatest legacy of the Hasmoneans was the creation of sovereign Jewish state – the first independent Jewish polity since the fall of the First Temple in 587/6 BCE, and a rare example of indigenous rule in an age dominated by great empires. Although their kingdom lasted less than a century, its existence had a profound impact on Jewish national consciousness. According to historian Doron Mendels, when Judea came under Roman rule, Jews continued to look back to the Hasmonean period as a golden age of independence. This consciousness contributed to later efforts to revive Jewish sovereignty, which culminated in the major Jewish uprisings against Rome in the 1st and 2nd centuries CE.

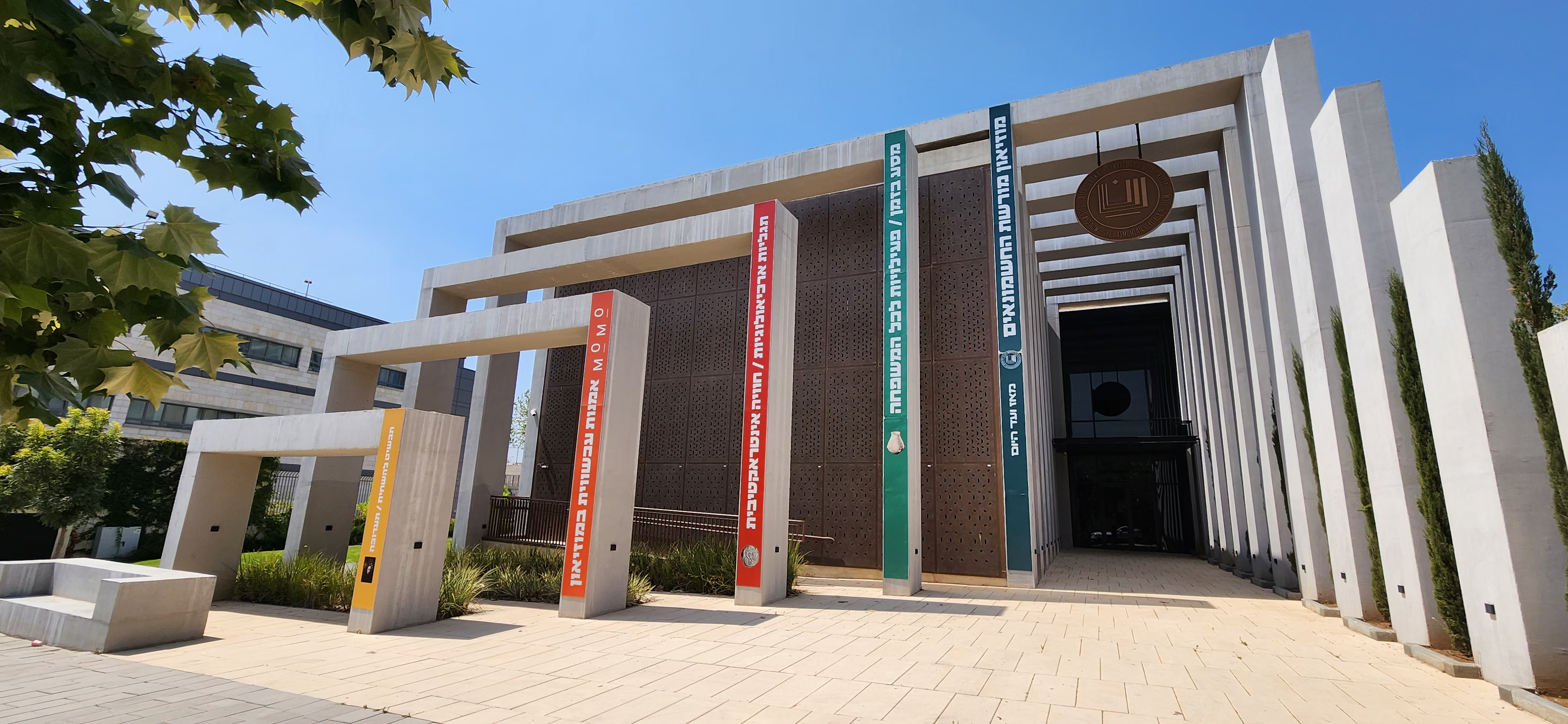
Hasmonean Heritage Museum, Modi'in-Maccabim-Re'ut

=== Jewish religious scholarship ===
Jewish tradition holds that the claiming of kingship by the later Hasmoneans led to their eventual downfall, since that title was only to be held by descendants of the line of King David. The Hasmonean bureaucracy was filled with men with Greek names, and the dynasty eventually became very Hellenised, to the annoyance of many of its more traditionally-minded Jewish subjects. Frequent dynastic quarrels also contributed to the view among Jews of later generations that the latter Hasmoneans were degenerate.

=== Influence on Jewish religious attitudes and practice ===
Since the 1990s, a growing body of research has explored several major changes in Jewish ideas and practice during the Hasmonean period. Shaye J. D. Cohen's 1999 book, The Beginnings of Jewishness posited that Jewish identity first began to transcend the Judean nationality and become a religious identity only in the late 2nd century BCE, when the Hasmoneans began conquering and converting neighboring peoples to Judaism. Reinhard Gregor Kratz's 2013 book Historisches und Biblisches Israel (published in English in 2015 as Historical and Biblical Israel) argued that "biblical" and "non-biblical" Israelite or Jewish traditions existed for centuries in antiquity, with biblical Judaism only becoming predominant under the Hasmoneans. John J. Collins's 2017 book, The Invention of Judaism, identified the mid-2nd century BCE as the first time in which contemporary literature is focused on specific questions of Jewish law (halakha). Finally, Yonatan Adler's 2022 book, The Origins of Judaism presented archaeological evidence that many standard Jewish religious practices—such as kashrut and maintaining ritual purity—were not commonly observed before Hasmonean rule.

== Ancient sources ==
The principal historical source for the period from the accession of Antiochus IV Epiphanes to the Seleucid throne to the assassination of Simon (c. 175–134 BCE) is 1 Maccabees, generally dated to the reign of John Hyrcanus. The book was originally written in Hebrew in Judea, probably in Jerusalem, and follows the style of the historiographic sections of the Hebrew Bible; it draws on the author's reminiscences and on archival sources: letters from the Roman Senate and Seleucid kings to the Maccabean brothers, as well as priestly annals preserved in the Temple; references to official archives and Hellenistic epistolary practice support the authenticity of these documents. The book also shows a marked pro-Hasmonean bias and displays open admiration for Judah Maccabee, leading most scholars to view it as the dynasty's official version of events. Hebrew copies were still in circulation in the third century CE, but the Hebrew original has since been lost; only Greek versions survive.

2 Maccabees is a separate work, not a sequel. Composed in Greek, it originated in the Jewish community of Egypt in the late 2nd century BCE, and centers on the exploits of Judah the Maccabee, the author's revered hero. The narrative ends not with Judah's death but with his final victory over Nicanor in 160 BCE. Although shorter than 1 Maccabees and often judged the weaker historical source, its introductory chapters, which recount the events leading to the decrees absent from 1 Maccabees, are essential for understanding the background of the Hasmonean era. The book is an epitome of a five volumes of history by Jason of Cyrene, which the epitomator abridged and edited. Lacking the straightforwardness of 1 Maccabees, it abounds in miracle stories and a theological tone, and casts the conflict as Hellenism versus Judaism, with "Judaism" appearing for the first time in extant sources. Historian Daniel R. Schwartz believes the thematic differences in 1 Maccabees and 2 Maccabees reflect the ideological divide on whether Jews should be oriented around religion or politics, in the form of Jewish theocracies and/or secular nationalism.

Another source for the Hasmonean period is Megillat Taanit ("Scroll of Fasting"), a late Second Temple-era Pharisaic text in Aramaic that lists thirty-five dates on which Jews are forbidden to fast and, on some dates, to eulogize, thereby turning them into minor holidays. It was likely compiled in the decades before 70 CE and is traditionally linked to Shammaite circles (possibly revolutionary ones), though its authorship and exact date are unproven. Many entries commemorate Hasmonean successes, among them the Temple's rededication, the defeat of Nicanor, the capture of the Akra, Antiochus's withdrawal from Jerusalem, adoption of a new official dating formula, the conquests of Samaria and Beth-Shean, the destruction of the Mount Gerizim temple under John Hyrcanus, and the capture of Straton's Tower under Alexander Jannaeus. Several of these commemorations are already fixated by 1 Maccabees. The appended Scholion, a rabbinic-era commentary in Hebrew, survives in two late redactions that often diverge; the widely printed "Hybrid Version" is a medieval mix of the two.

Lastly, another important source is Josephus (late first century CE), a Jerusalem priest of Hasmonean descent who commanded Jewish resistance in Galilee early in the First Jewish Revolt, later surrendered to the Romans, and wrote in Rome under Flavian patronage. In The Jewish War (c. 75–79 CE), while focused on the First Jewish–Roman War, he provides as background a brief account of the Maccabean revolt and the subsequent Hasmonean (and Herodian) periods that adds some unique details. Antiquities of the Jews (published during the 90s CE), offers a longer and more detailed treatment, but much of the added content is rhetorical expansion rather than new information. For the revolt and the years covered in parallel with 1 Maccabees he paraphrases that work, with reworking, inferences, and added notices likely drawn from Nicolaus of Damascus and Strabo; for later periods he relies mainly on Nicolaus (and on Strabo in Antiquities).

== See also ==
- Timeline of the Second Temple period
- List of Jewish states and dynasties

== Bibliography ==
=== Ancient sources ===
- Diodorus Siculus. Bibliotheca Historica.
- Josephus. Antiquities of the Jews.
- Josephus. The Jewish War.
- Tacitus. Histories.
- 1 Maccabees.
- 2 Maccabees.
- Babylonian Talmud.
- Jerusalem Talmud.
- Megillat Taanit.
- Mishnah.

=== Modern sources ===
- Adler, Yonatan (2022). The Origins of Judaism: An Archaeological-Historical Reappraisal. The Anchor Yale Bible Reference Library. Yale University Press. ISBN 978-0-300-26837-9.
- Bar Kochva, Bezalel (December 2002). "The Conquest of Samaria by John Hyrcanus: The Pretext for the Siege, Jewish Settlement in the 'Akraba District, and the Destruction of the City of Samaria". Cathedra: For the History of Eretz Israel and Its Yishuv (106). Yad Izhak Ben-Zvi: 7–34. JSTOR 23406160.
- Broshi, Magen (2001). "Estimating the Population of Ancient Jerusalem". Bread, Wine, Walls and Scrolls. London & New York: Sheffield Academic Press. pp. 110–120. ISBN 1-841-27201-9.
- Dąbrowa, Edward (2009). The Hasmoneans and their State: A Study in History, Ideology, and the Institutions. Jagiellonian University Press. ISBN 9788323380481.
- Delcor, Mathias (2007). "The Apocrypha and Pseudepigrapha of the Hellenistic period". In Davies, W. D.; Finkelstein, Louis (eds.). The Hellenistic Age. The Cambridge History of Judaism. Vol. 2 (4th ed.). Cambridge University Press. pp. 409–503. ISBN 978-0-521-21929-7.
- Ilan, Tal (1987). "The Names of the Hasmoneans in the Second Temple Period / שמות החשמונאים בימי בית שני". Eretz-Israel: Archaeological, Historical and Geographical Studies / ארץ-ישראל: מחקרים בידיעת הארץ ועתיקותיה. יט: 238–241. ISSN 0071-108X. JSTOR 23621234.
- Goldstein, Jonathan A. (2007). "The Hasmonean revolt and the Hasmonean dynasty". In Davies, W. D.; Finkelstein, Louis (eds.). The Hellenistic Age. The Cambridge History of Judaism. Vol. 2 (4th ed.). Cambridge University Press. pp. 292–351. ISBN 978-0-521-21929-7.
- Goodblatt, David M. (2006). Elements of Ancient Jewish Nationalism. Cambridge University Press. ISBN 9780511499067.
- Grabbe, Lester L. (2020). A History of the Jews and Judaism in the Second Temple Period, Volume 3: The Maccabaean Revolt, Hasmonaean Rule, and Herod the Great (175–4 BCE). The Library of Second Temple Studies. T&T Clark. ISBN 978-0-5676-9294-8.
- Grabbe, Lester L. (2021). A History of the Jews and Judaism in the Second Temple Period, Volume 4: The Jews under the Roman Shadow (4 BCE–150 CE). The Library of Second Temple Studies. T&T Clark. ISBN 978-0-567-70070-4.
- Ji, Chang-Ho (2020). "A Late Hellenistic–Early Roman Fortress at Khirbat Mudayna as-Saliya, Central Jordan". Palestine Exploration Quarterly. 152 (3): 207–233. doi:10.1080/00310328.2020.1759297.
- Leibner, Uzi (2009). Settlement and History in Hellenistic, Roman, and Byzantine Galilee: An Archaeological Survey of the Eastern Galilee (PDF). Texts and Studies in Ancient Judaism. Vol. 127. Tübingen: Mohr Siebeck. ISBN 978-3-16-149871-8.
- Magness, Jodi (2012). The Archaeology of the Holy Land: From the Destruction of Solomon's Temple to the Muslim Conquest. Cambridge University Press. ISBN 978-1-139-01383-3.
- Magness, Jodi (2024). Jerusalem Through The Ages: From Its Beginnings To The Crusades. Oxford University Press. ISBN 978-0-19-093780-5. Archived from the original on 8 December 2024.
- Mendels, Doron (1992). The Rise and Fall of Jewish Nationalism: Jewish and Christian Ethnicity in Ancient Palestine. Anchor Bible Reference Library. Doubleday. ISBN 978-0-385-26126-5.
- Mitchell, Margaret; Young, Frances, eds. (2006). The Cambridge History of Christianity: Origins to Constantine. Vol. 1. Cambridge University Press. ISBN 9780521812399.
- Muraoka, T. (1992). Studies in Qumran Aramaic. Peeters. ISBN 978-90-6831-419-9.
- Neusner, J. (1983). "Jews in Iran". In Yarshater, Ehsan (ed.). The Cambridge History of Iran, Volume 3 (2); the Seleucid, Parthian and Sasanian periods. Cambridge University Press. ISBN 978-0-521-24693-4.
- Noam, Vered (2006). "Megillat Taanit – The Scroll of Fasting". In Safrai, Shemu'el (ed.). The Literature of the Sages: Part 2 — Midrash and Targum, Liturgy, Poetry, Mysticism, Contracts, Inscriptions, Ancient Science, and the Languages of Rabbinic Literature. Compendia rerum iudaicarum ad Novum Testamentum Section 2, The literature of the Jewish people in the period of the Second Temple and the Talmud. Assen, Philadelphia: Royal Van Gorcum. pp. 339–362. ISBN 978-90-232-4222-2.
- Patrich, Joseph; Edelcopp, Marcos (2013). "Four Stages in the Evolution of the Temple Mount". Revue Biblique (1946-). 120 (3). Peeters Publishers: 321–361. ISSN 0035-0907.
- Peleg-Barkat, Orit (2015). "Tradition vs. Innovation in Royal Construction: The Architectural Decoration of the Hasmonaean and Herodian Palaces at the Jericho Valley / מסורת מול חידוש בבנייה המלכותית: העיטור האדריכלי בארמונות החשמונאים והורדוס בבקעת יריחו". Eretz-Israel: Archaeological, Historical and Geographical Studies / ארץ-ישראל: מחקרים בידיעת הארץ ועתיקותיה. לא. Israel Exploration Society: 325–341. ISSN 0071-108X.
- Rajak, Tessa (1994). "The Jews Under Hasmonean Rule". In Crook, J. A.; Lintott, Andrew; Rawson, Elizabeth (eds.). The Last Age of the Roman Republic, 146–43 BC. The Cambridge Ancient History. Vol. 9. Cambridge University Press. pp. 274–309. doi:10.1017/CHOL9781139054379.010. ISBN 978-1-139-05437-9.
- Rappaport, Uriel (1991). "The Hasmonean State and Hellenism / על 'התייוונותם' של החשמונאים". Tarbiz / תרביץ. ס (4): 477–503. ISSN 0334-3650.
- Rappaport, Uriel (2004). 1 Maccabees: Introduction, Translation, and Commentary (in Hebrew). Yad Izhak Ben Zvi. ISBN 965-217-221-9.
- Raviv, Dvir (2018). "The Artabba Fortress: An Unknown Hasmonaean-Herodian Fortress on the Northern Border of Judaea". Israel Exploration Journal. 68 (1): 56–76. ISSN 0021-2059.
- Raviv, Dvir; Zissu, Boaz (2019). "The Arumah Fortress (Khirbet al-'Urma): A Fortified Site from the Second Temple Period in Eastern Samaria". Israel Exploration Journal. 69 (2): 202–219. ISSN 0021-2059.
- Raviv, Dvir (2019-07-03). "Granting of the Toparchies of Ephraim, Ramathaim and Lod to Hasmonean Judea". Tel Aviv. 46 (2): 267–285. doi:10.1080/03344355.2019.1650500. ISSN 0334-4355.
- Regev, Eyal (2013). The Hasmoneans: Ideology, Archaeology, Identity. Journal of Ancient Judaism: Supplements. Göttingen: Vandenhoeck & Ruprecht Gmbh & Co. ISBN 978-3525550434.
- Sabar, Roi (2022). "Ḥorvat Tefen: A Hasmonean Fortress in the Hinterland of Akko-Ptolemais". Bulletin of the American Schools of Oriental Research. 387: 55–85.
- Shatzman, Israel (1991). The Armies of the Hasmonaeans and Herod. From Hellenistic to Roman Frameworks. Texts and Studies in Ancient Judaism. Mohr Siebeck. doi:10.1628/978-3-16-158776-4. ISBN 978-3161587764.
- Schwartz, Daniel (2001). "כהונה ומלוכה בתקופה החשמונאית" [Priesthood and Monarchy in the Hasmonean Period]. In Gafni, Isaiah (ed.). קהל ישראל: השלטון העצמי היהודי לדורותיו – העת העתיקה [The Ancient Period]. Kehal Yisrael: Jewish Self-Rule Through The Ages (in Hebrew). Vol. 1. The Zalman Shazar Center for Jewish History. pp. 13–26.
- Vermes, Géza (2014). The True Herod. Bloomsbury. ISBN 978-0-567-48841-1.
- Geller, Markham J. (October 1979). "Alexander Jannaeus and the Pharisee Rift". Journal of Jewish Studies. 30 (2): 202–211. doi:10.18647/915/JJS-1979. ISSN 0022-2097.
- Boccaccini, Gabriele (2016). "Non-Apocalyptic Responses to Apocalyptic Events: Notes on the Sociology of Apocalypticism". In Grabbe, Lester L.; Boccaccini, Gabriele; Zurawski, Jason M. (eds.). Seleucid and Hasmonean Periods and the Apocalyptic Worldview. Bloomsbury Publishing Plc. ISBN 978-0-567-66614-7. OCLC 935710351.
- Zeitlin, Solomon (October 1957). "The Book of "Jubilees" and the Pentateuch". The Jewish Quarterly Review. 48 (2): 218. doi:10.2307/1452712.
- Catherwood, Christopher (2011). A brief history of the Middle East. London, Philadelphia, PA: Robinson, Running Press Book Publishers. ISBN 978-0-7624-4102-0.
- Harkabi, Yehoshafat; Altshuler, David A. (1983). The Bar Kokhba syndrome: risk and realism in international politics (1st ed.). Chappaqua, NY: Rossel Books. ISBN 978-0-940646-01-8.
- Machiela, Daniel A.; Jones, Robert (2021-06-02). "Was there a Revival of Hebrew during the Hasmonean Period?: A Reassessment of the Evidence". Journal of Ancient Judaism. 12 (2): 217–280. doi:10.30965/21967954-12340022. ISSN 1869-3296.
- Schwartz, Daniel R. (2021). "Judea versus Judaism: Between 1 and 2 Maccabees - TheTorah.com". www.thetorah.com. Archived from the original on 2024-03-16.
- Spiezer, Yosef; Zelinger, Yehiel; Zissu, Boaz (2026-03-23). "The Rural Hinterland of Jerusalem in the Hasmonean Period". Journal of Ancient Judaism. 17 (1): 80–121. doi:10.30965/21967954-bja10086. ISSN 1869-3296.
- Pastor, Jack (2013). Land and Economy in Ancient Palestine. Taylor & Francis Group. ISBN 978-0-203-41095-0.

=== Further reading ===
- Atkinson, Kenneth (2018). The Hasmoneans and Their Neighbors: New Historical Reconstructions from the Dead Sea Scrolls and Classical Sources. Jewish and Christian Texts. T&T Clark. ISBN 9780567680822.
- Berthelot, Katell (2018). In Search of the Promised Land? The Hasmonean Dynasty Between Biblical Models and Hellenistic Diplomacy. Journal of Ancient Judaism: Supplements. Vol. 24. Vandenhoeck & Ruprecht. ISBN 978-3525552520.
- Noam, Vered (2018). Shifting Images of the Hasmoneans: Second Temple Legends and Their Reception in Josephus and Rabbinic Literature. Oxford University Press. ISBN 9780198811381.
- Rajak, Tessa (2018). "The Hasmoneans and the Uses of Hellenism". The Jewish Dialogue with Greece and Rome: Studies in Cultural and Social Interaction. Arbeiten zur Geschichte des antiken Judentums und des Urchristentums. Vol. 48. Brill. pp. 61–80. doi:10.1163/9789047400196_009. ISBN 978-90-04-11285-8.
