= Hyrcanus inscription =

Ancient bowl fragment discovered in Jerusalem

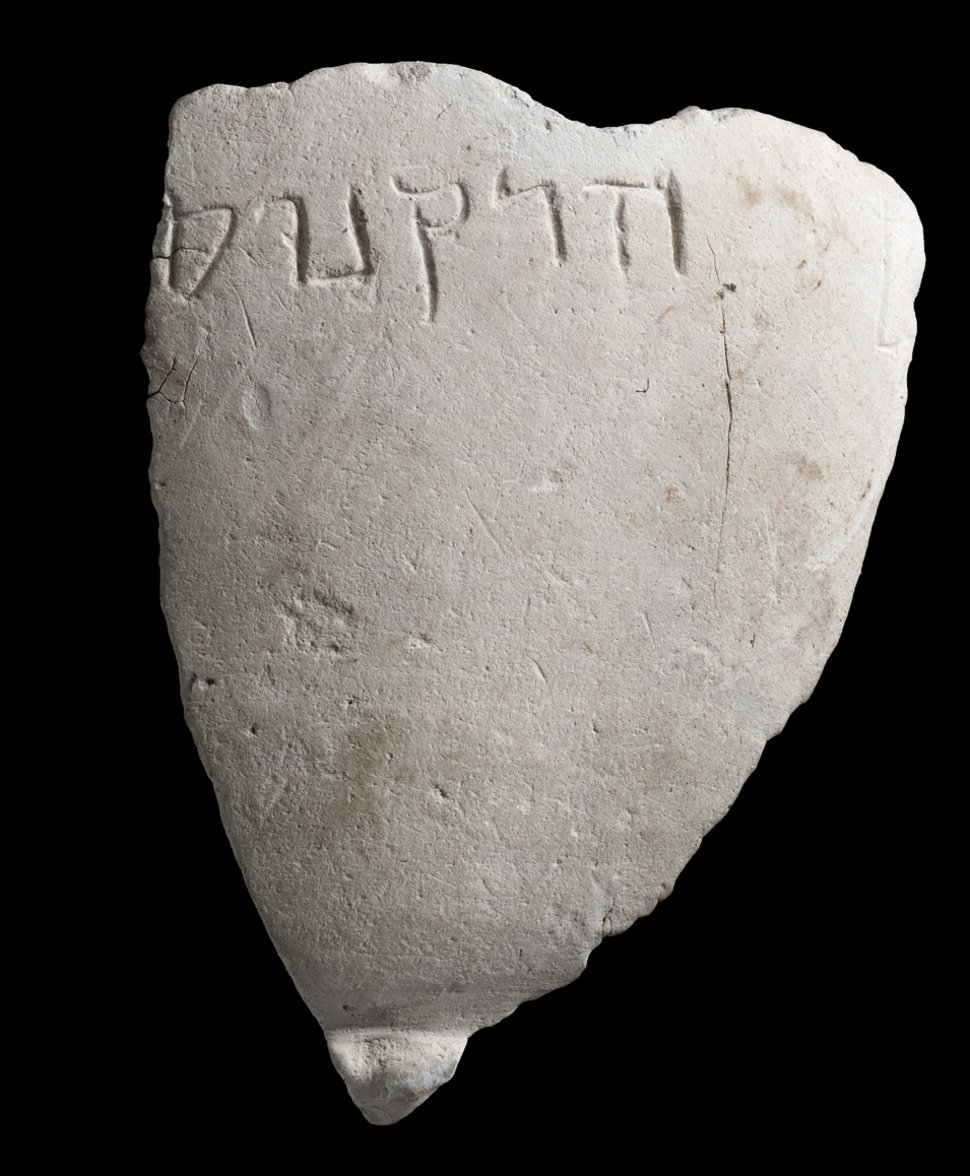
- Fragment of a limestone (chalk) bowl from the Hamonean period bearing the name "Hyrcanus" in Hebrew letters
- Type: Inscribed stone vessel fragment
- Material: Limestone (chalk)
- Writing: Hebrew (Jewish script)
- Created: ~100 BCE
- Discovered: 2015; Giv'ati Parking Lot; City of David, Jerusalem
- Present location: Israel Antiquities Authority
- Culture: Second Temple Judaism (Hasmonean era)

The 'Hyrcanus inscription" is an ancient bowl fragment.

== The inscription ==
In 2015, during an excavation in the City of David Givʽati Parking Lot in Jerusalem, archaeologists unearthed a fragment of a chalk bowl engraved with the name "Hyrcanus" (Hebrew הרקנוס HRQNWS). Chalk vessels like this were commonly used by Jews due to their resistance to ritual impurity. The name was common during the Hasmonean period, making it difficult to pinpoint the exact person. There were two prominent figures with this name: John Hyrcanus and John Hyrcanus II.

== See also ==
- Benaiah inscription
- stone vessels in ancient Judaea
