= Herodian architecture =

Building style named after Herod the Great

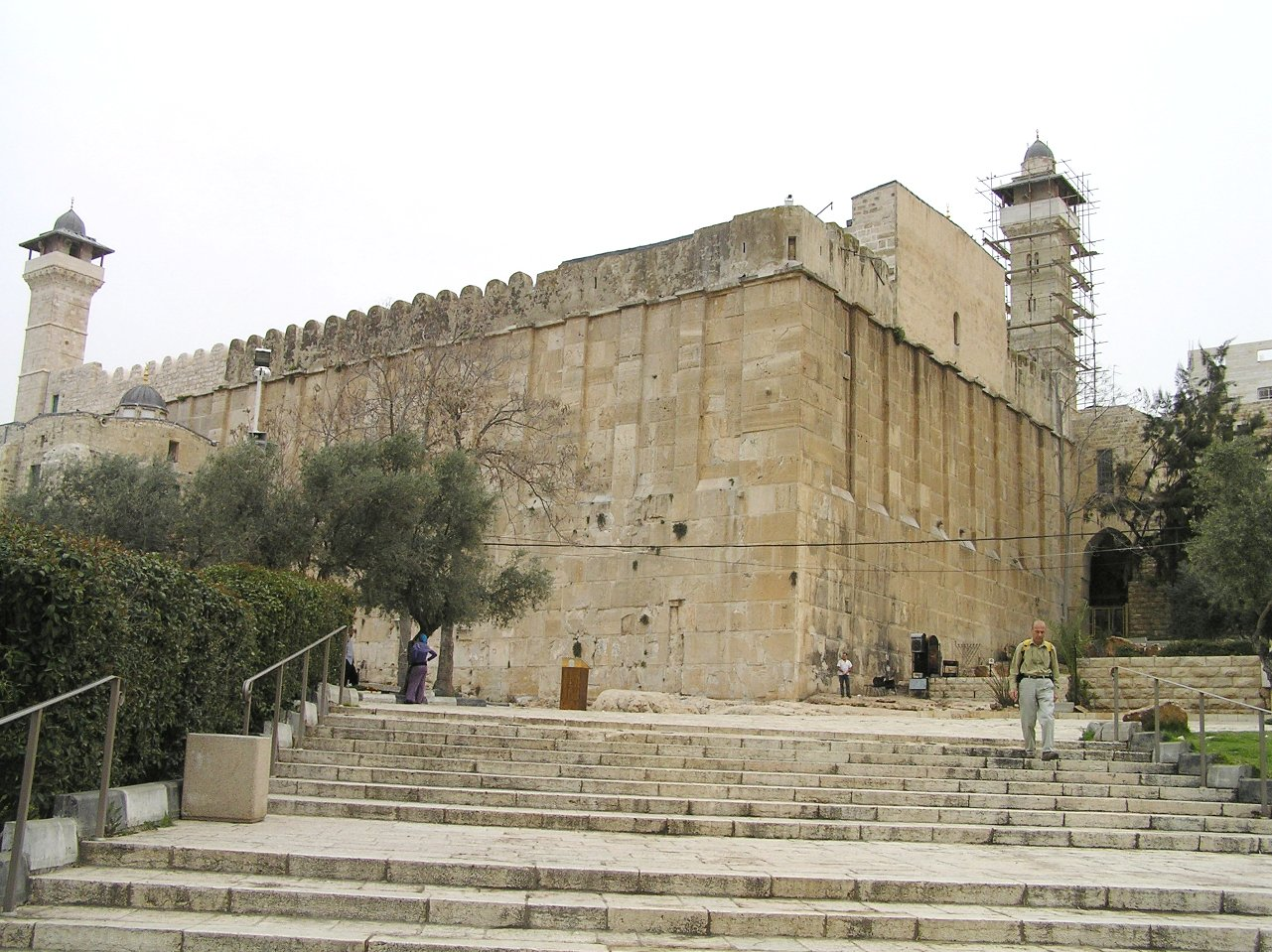
The enclosure of the Cave of the Patriarchs, Hebron. This large rectangular enclosure around the famous caves is the only Herodian structure to survive fully intact.

Herodian architecture is a style of classical architecture characteristic of the numerous building projects undertaken during the reign (37–4 BC) of Herod the Great, who ruled Judaea as a client kingdom of the Roman Empire. Herod undertook many colossal building projects, most famously his reconstruction of the Temple in Jerusalem (c. 19 BC). Many of his structures were built upon comparable, previous Hasmonean buildings and most of his have, in their turn, vanished as well.

Herod's architectural endeavors are distinguished by their strategic placement to maximize dramatic vistas, evident in locations such as the northern palace at Masada, the third palace at Jericho, the seaside palace at Caesarea, and the Herodium near the desert's edge. Many of his projects often combined multiple purposes, incorporating ceremonial and administrative spaces, storage, water facilities, baths, swimming pools, and fortifications. Emphasis was also placed on integrating water features and greenery, utilizing local materials like kurkar in Caesarea and limestone in desert regions. Concurrently, Herod imported exotic materials, such as volcanic sand from Italy for Caesarea, and employed foreign craftsmen for intricate decorations and the opus reticulatum technique.

== Innovations ==
Herod introduced numerous architectural innovations and construction techniques in his buildings, such as the domes inside the Double Gate to the Temple Mount. He adapted the mikveh—a Jewish ritual bath—for use as the frigidarium in the Roman-style bathhouses in his many palaces. Herod also developed an innovative combination of palace and fortress; examples include the Antonia Fortress in Jerusalem, the Herodium in the Judean Desert about 2 miles south of Bethlehem, and Masada. Characteristically, they have (or had) one tower higher and stronger than the others. Herod's fortification innovations strongly influenced the military architecture of subsequent generations.

In line with contemporary Jewish customs, Herod generally avoided the representation of human and animal figures, even in the closed and private parts of his palaces, but there were a few exceptions. Herod's Palace reportedly had bronze figures (probably animals) through which water was dispensed. Towards the end of his reign, Herod erected a golden eagle above the gate of the Temple. This caused some outrage within the city, and several youths removed and destroyed the eagle. They were subsequently executed.

== Herod's Temple ==
In the eighteenth year of his reign (20–19 BC), Herod rebuilt the Second Temple in Jerusalem on "a more magnificent scale". The new Temple was finished in a year and a half, although work on out-buildings and courts continued another eighty years. To comply with Jewish religious laws of purity, Herod employed a thousand priests as masons and carpenters for the rebuilding. The finished temple, which was to a great extent destroyed by the Romans in 70 AD, is often referred to as Herod's Temple. The Wailing Wall (Western Wall) in Jerusalem was for many years the only section accessible of the four retaining walls whose construction was begun by Herod to create a flat platform (on the Temple Mount) upon which his Temple was constructed. Recent findings suggest that the Temple Mount walls and Robinson's Arch may not have been completed until at least 20 years after his death during the reign of Herod Agrippa II.

This platform and the retaining walls are still the present foundations of the Haram Al-Sharif with the Aqsa Mosqueand the Dome of The Rock.

== Herod's palace-fortresses ==
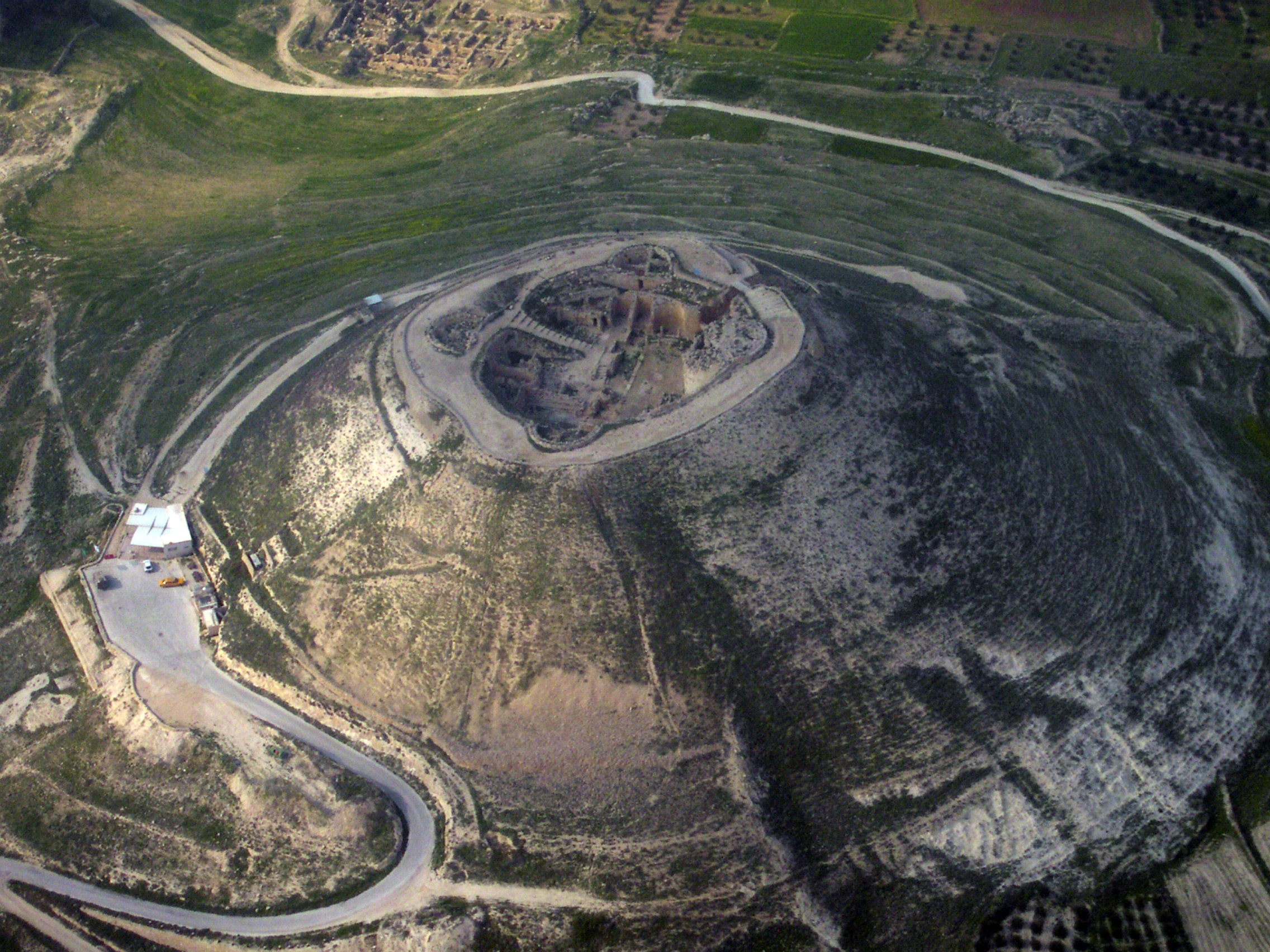
Aerial view of the acropolis of Herodium

Herod constructed several lavish palace-fortresses within his kingdom. The term 'Herodian palace-fortress' is only used for a type of isolated hilltop desert structures that combined elaborate defensive military architecture with royal residential architecture. While an entire complex is considered a palace-fortress, it may contain one or two residential palaces, the latter being the case at Masada.

- Upper Herodium, 12 km south of Jerusalem, rose to a height of about 45 meters.
- Masada, near the western Dead Sea shore
- Alexandreion, overlooking the Jordan Valley
- Hyrkania, in the Judaean desert
- Cypros or Kypros, next to his winter palaces at Jericho, named for his mother
- Machaerus, east of the Dead Sea

Herodian palace-fortresses are a category by themselves, distinct from his other palaces - urban, coastal, or leisure palaces -, be they fortified or not.

== Other Herodian palaces ==
Herod also built for himself a number of other palaces:

- Herod's Palace in Jerusalem
- The so-called Promontory Palace in Caesarea Maritima, a name coined by Ehud Netzer
- The Herodian winter palaces at Jericho, a large complex built as an expansion of the Hasmonean winter palaces there.

== Herodian masonry ==
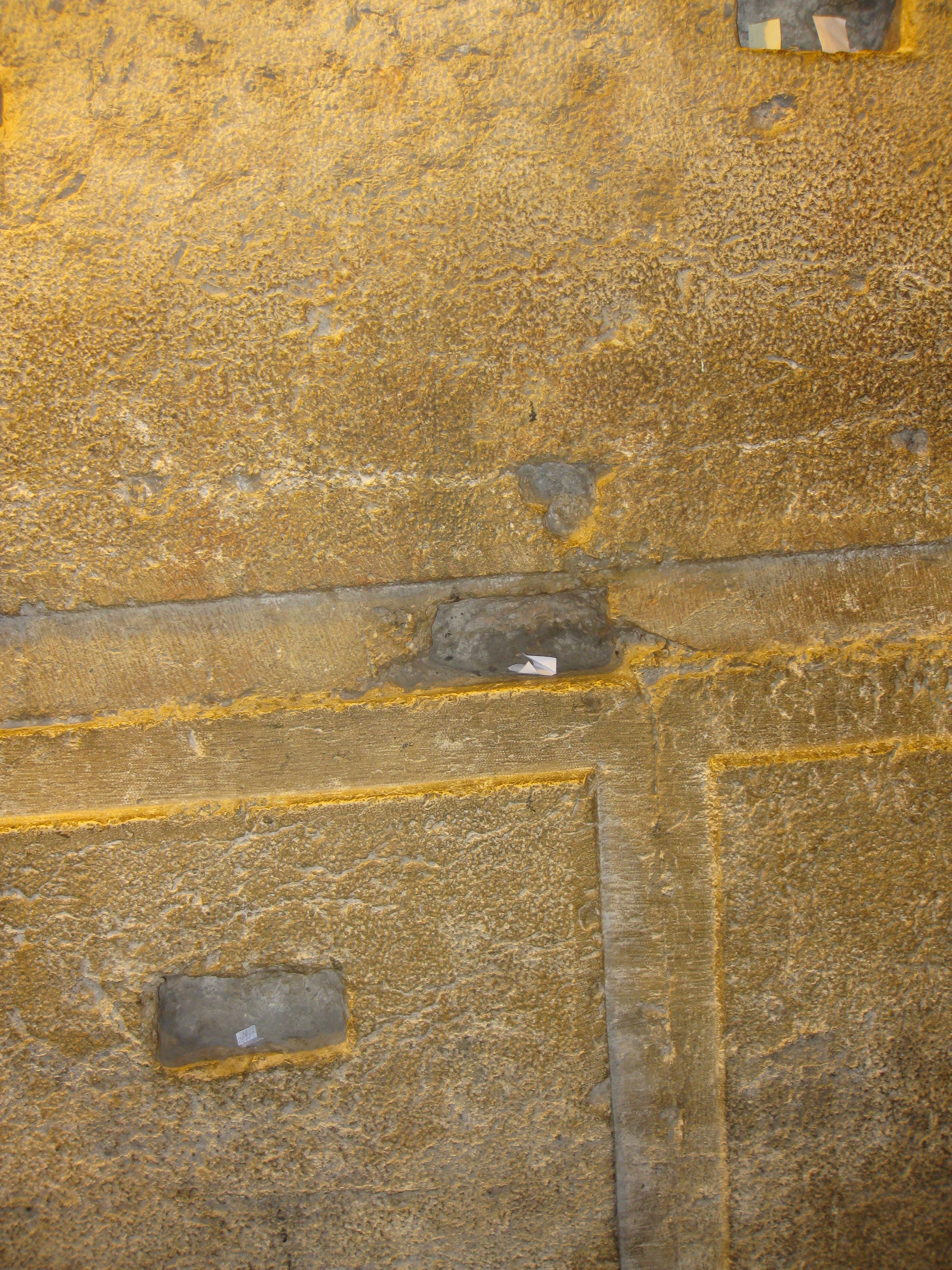
Detail of the distinctive pattern of Herodian stone-dressing as seen in the Western Wall Tunnel.

Herod's massive building projects featured a distinctive style of stone-dressing. This stone-dressing method—usually featuring the pale local meleke limestone—was so prominently practiced in Herod's day that it has led to such terms as “Herodian blocks”, “Herodian masonry”, “Herodian dressing”, and the like. It makes Herodian stones easily discernible from the earlier stone courses below, and later ones above, in the surviving walls at many sites. Best known is the example of the impressive retaining walls of the Temple Mount, readily visible at the Western Wall.

Enormous quantities of stone were needed for these structures and the remains of the numerous quarries used can still be found, especially in the vicinity of Jerusalem's Old City, notably those to the north known as Solomon's Quarries. Freeing the stones from the bedrock was an elaborate process: Wide grooves were chiseled with metal tools around the intended stone block. The block was then freed up by driving metal wedges into the grooves. The initial dressing of the stone was probably accomplished on site before transport. Many of these stones were very large, weighing between two and five tons. (The largest found, in the Western Wall Tunnel, measures some 12.8 meters in length, 3.4 meters high and 4.3 meters deep; it weighs about 660 tons.) Once moved to the building site, further fine chiseling was done and the blocks were hauled into place using ramps, cranes and crow bars. The stones were laid in dry courses, typically about 1 meter high without the use of any mortar. Each course was set 3 to 5 cm back from the course underneath it. Final dressing and refinements were carried out once the stones had been set in place.

The huge rectangular building blocks, laid in horizontal courses, feature flat, projecting central portions (bosses) surrounded by narrow, shallow dressed margins (“marginal drafts”) creating a finely chiseled, frame-like effect. The depressed “frame” is sunk some 2 centimeters below the smooth face of the stone and its average width is about 8 centimeters. A wide, toothed chisel was used to smooth the stone margins.

The origins of this margin-cutting style predate Herod, as witnessed by the Hellenistic architecture of Alexandria, Asia Minor, and Greece itself, as well as by examples in the Levant (e.g., the palace of the Sons of Tuvia at Iraq, el-Amir in Jordan (near Amman), dating from at least the 3rd century BC). Examples of pre-Herodian margin stone-cutting are also attested in Jerusalem itself: at the “Tower of David” (the Paza’el Tower), in the "First city wall" and in the Hasmonean Tower unearthed in the Jewish Quarter. Authentic “Herodian masonry” includes examples at the sites at Hebron (Elonei Mamre, the Cave of Machpelah), in the Augusteum in Sebastia and possibly also in the Herodian platform at Caesarea Maritima. In Jerusalem, in addition to the Temple Mount, Herodian stones are preserved beneath the Damascus Gate. It has been observed that this distinctive stone-dressing style serves as a decorative theme on Second Temple period ossuaries found in the Jerusalem area.

== List of major Herodian building projects ==
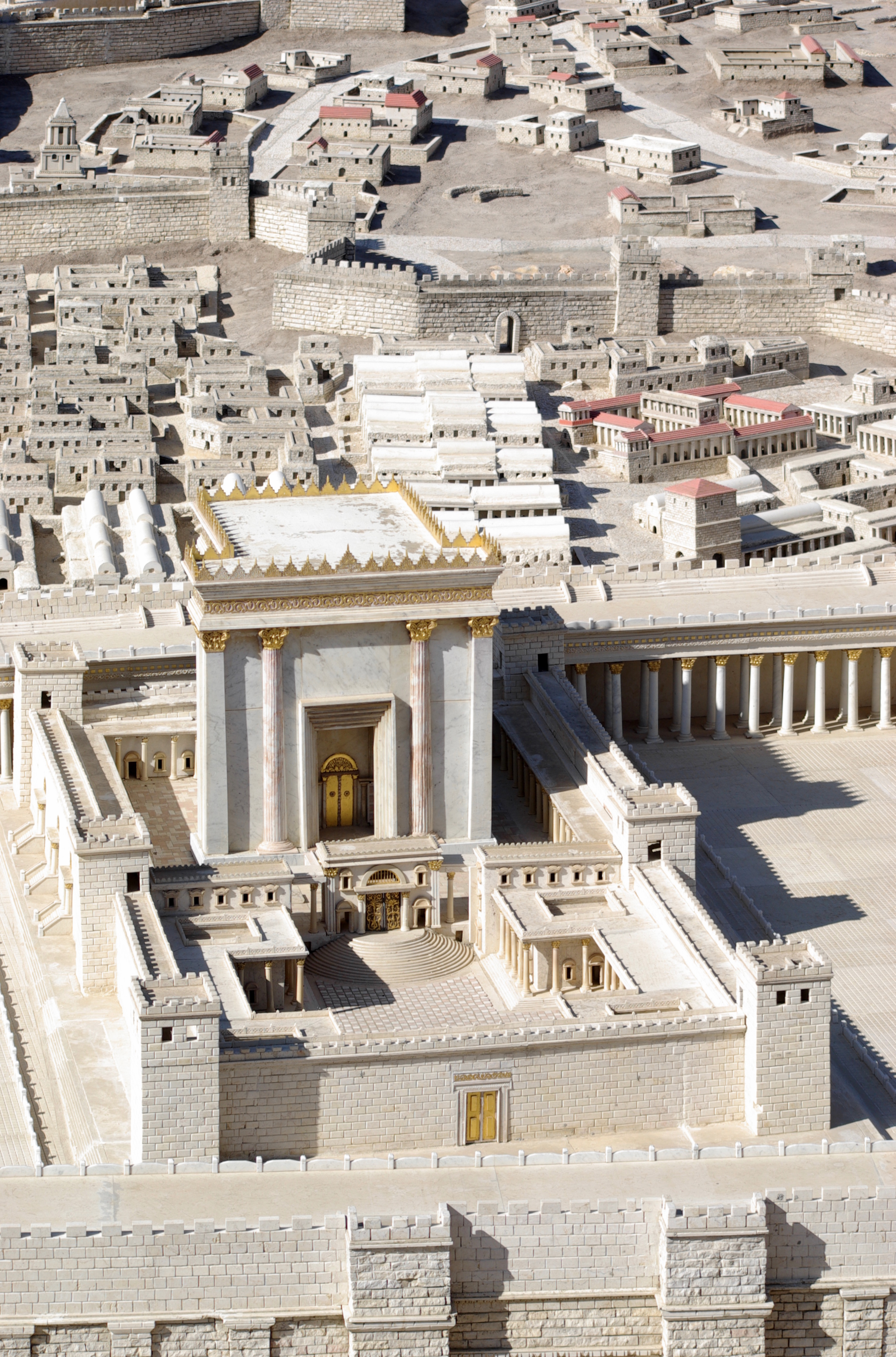
Model of Herod's Temple (renovation of the Second Temple) in the Israel Museum.

- Herod's Palace in Jerusalem (last quarter of the 1st century BC)
- The Temple Mount, Jerusalem (ca. 19 BC)
  - Herod's Temple
    - Western Wall
    - Western Wall Tunnel
    - Western Stone
    - Robinson's Arch
  - Antonia Fortress
  - Royal Stoa (Jerusalem)
- Roman public facilities, Jerusalem (1st century BC)
  - Theater, amphitheater, hippodrome (scattered remains have been found, but not much is known)
  - Renovation of the Pool of Siloam
  - Jerusalem water channel
  - Jerusalem pilgrim road
- The royal complex at Herodium (last quarter of the 1st century BC)
  - The Palace-fortress
  - The Lower Herodium complex
  - Herod's Tomb
- The palace-fortress at Masada (37–15 BC)
- Machaerus, Hasmonean fortress rebuilt as a palace-fortress by Herod in 30 BC
- Antipatris, named by Herod in memory of his father, Antipater
- Cypros or Kypros, a palace-fortress near his winter palaces at Jericho, named after his mother
- Alexandrium, a Hasmonean palace which Herod rebuilt lavishly as a palace-fortress
- Caesarea Maritima with its harbor and palace (25–13 BC)
- Cave of the Patriarchs at Hebron
- Sebaste, now Sebastia at Nablus, which Herod restored and expanded
- Three winter palaces at Jericho (starting 36 BC)
- Three temples dedicated to Augustus (at Sebaste, Caesarea, and at Panias, with the last possibly identified with Omrit)

== See also ==
- Meleke
