= Benaiah inscription =

7th century BCE pottery shard

- Material: Ceramic
- Writing: Paleo-Hebrew
- Created: 7th century BCE
- Discovered: Israel
- Present location: Israel Antiquities Authority
- Period: First Temple period

The Benaiah inscription is an ancient pottery sherd found in Israel that dates back to the 7th century BCE. The artifact is currently in the care of the Israel Antiquities Authority.

== The inscription ==
The sherd bears a Hebrew inscription dating back to the 7th century BCE. It reads "ryhu bn bnh", which resembles the name "Zechariah son of Benaiah", a figure named in 2 Chronicles 10:24. The bowl likely originated between the reigns of Hezekiah and Zedekiah.

== See also ==
- List of inscriptions in biblical archaeology
