= Cypros =

Cypros may refer to:

- Cypros, a Nabataean noblewoman, wife of Antipater the Idumaean (c. 113 BCE – 43 BCE)
  - Cypros or Kypros, the Herodian palace-fortress next to his winter palaces at Jericho, named for his mother
- Cypros (wife of Herod Agrippa), queen consort of Judea, wife of Herod Agrippa (c. 11 BC – c. AD 44)

== See also ==
- Cyprus, an island and a country, classical Greek form Κύπρος (Kýpros)
