= 249 Squadron =

249 Squadron may refer to:

- No. 249 Squadron RAF
- 249th Airlift Squadron, USAF
- 249 Squadron (Israel), a police firefighting unit
