= Israel Fire and Rescue Services =

Israeli national fire agency

- כבאות והצלה לישראל
- Emblem of Israel Fire and Rescue Services

- Flag of Israel Fire and Rescue Services

Operational area
- Country: Israel

Agency overview
- Established: 1924
- Fire Commissioner: Eyal Casspi

Website
- Official website

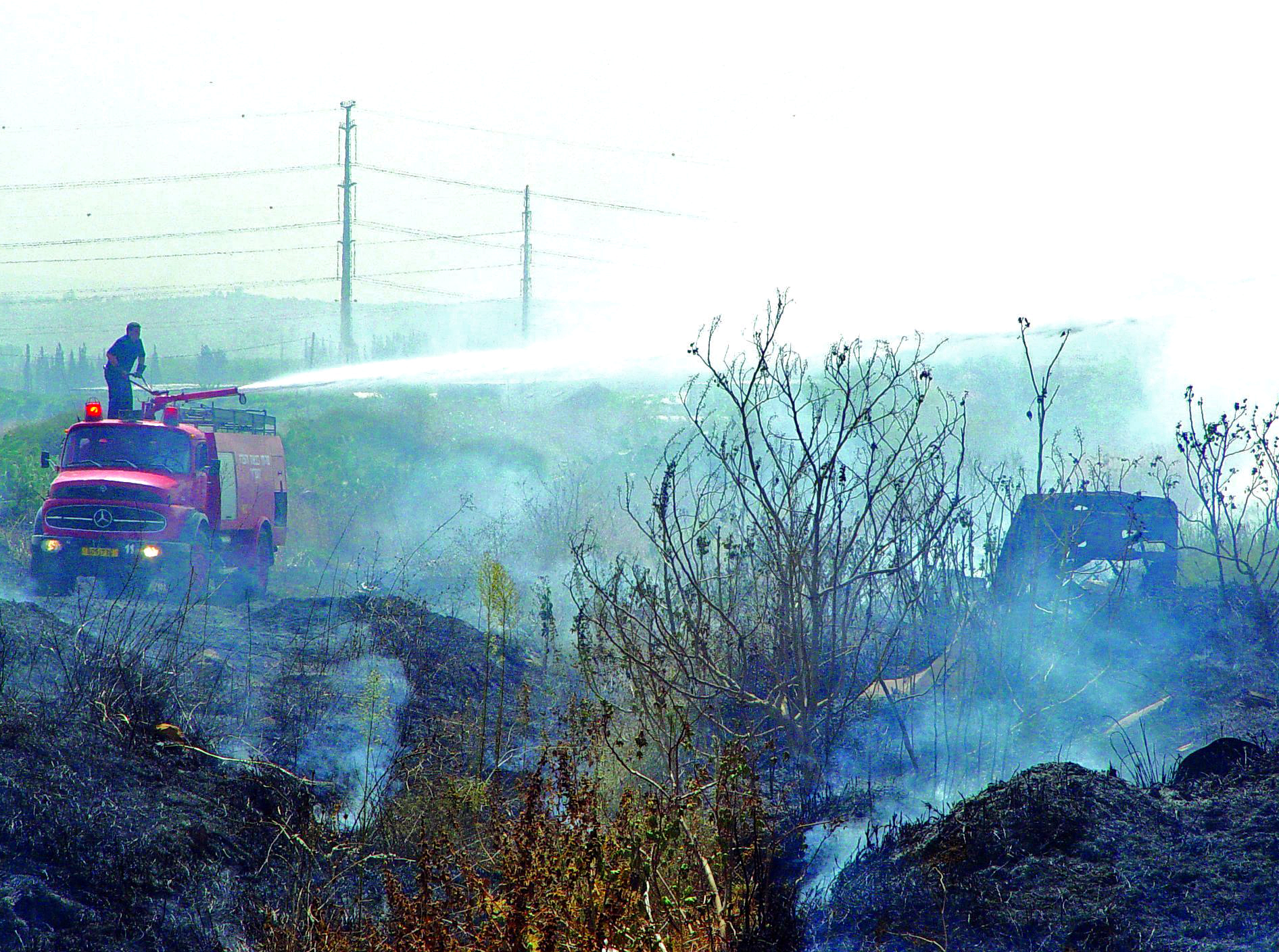
Israel Fire and Rescue Service Mercedes-Benz fire apparatus puts out a wild fire

The Israel Fire and Rescue Services (Hebrew: כבאות והצלה לישראל, romanized: Kaba'ut VeHatzala Le'Israel; also שירותי כבאות להצלה, Sherutei Kaba'ut VeHatzala) is the national Israeli fire and rescue organization subordinated to the Ministry of National Security. The service includes about 2000 firefighters manning 120 fire stations. Together with about 3000 volunteers they respond to an average of 90,000 events each year.

The organisation also provides rescue services from terror attacks, car accident and dangerous substance spillages, along with Magen David Adom, the National EMS. They are also involved in public education and awareness campaigns. The service is accessed by calling 102 from any phone. As of 2022, the commissioner of the services is Eyal Casspi.

== Organization ==
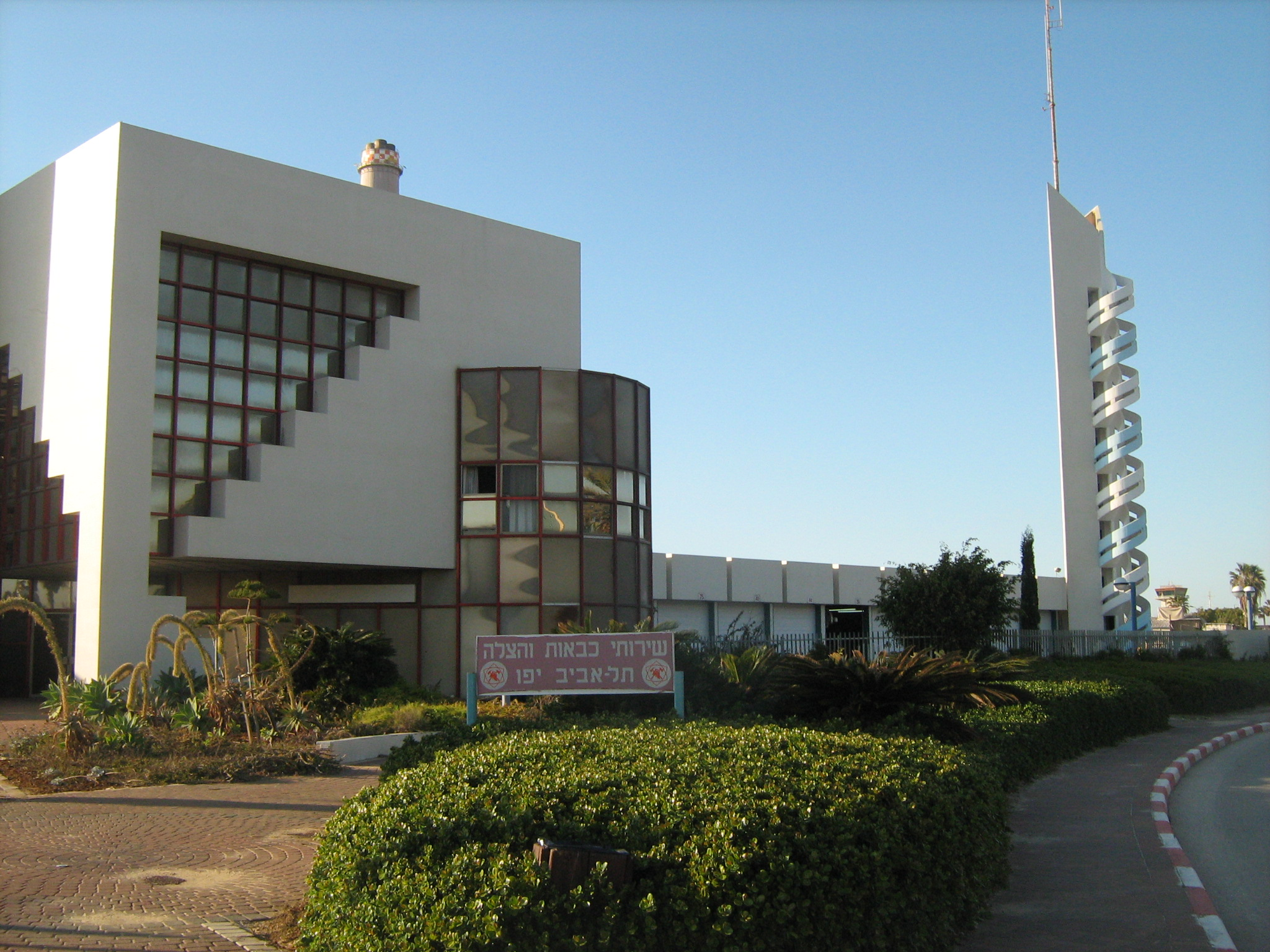
Fire station in Tel Aviv

There are 24 metro regions that have central major fire stations with supplemental smaller stations in neighboring villages and cities. After the 2010 Mount Carmel forest fire where many prison guards, civilians, police officer and two firefighters were killed, the government decided to create the Israel's Fire and Rescue Authority and organized the fire service on a national level like the police. The Israel Fire and Rescue Services consists of about 2,500 paid, professional firefighters along with an additional 200–400 "fire-scout" volunteers. There are 11 Hazardous Materials Units in Israel. All stations provide auto-extrication and are equipped with the latest gear for rescue and fire suppression. Major stations have a heavy rescue unit and ladder truck company. The fire-rescue apparatus are custom built in Israel at Beit Alfa Technologies of Beit Alpha Kibbutz on chassis of Mercedes-Benz, Man, Iveco, E-One, Chevrolet, and Ford modified to Israeli specifications in Israel. Most apparatus repairs and servicing is done by firefighter/mechanics in-station, as most stations have a fully equipped mechanic garage with lifts, welding equipment, and tools.

=== Organizational structure ===
Until the National Fire and Rescue Authority was established on February 8, 2013, firefighting services relied on 24 city firefighting and rescue associations (four municipal and 20 city union). In areas unrelated to the firefighting and rescue professions or to firefighters, the firefighting authority was part of the local authority to which it belonged, and is subordinate to it. The professional subject was the Firefighting and Rescue Commission. The Commission was headed by a firefighter and rescue officer with the rank of captain.

It is composed of seven districts (North, Hof, Dan, South, Central, Judea, Samaria and Jerusalem), with the head of each district A district commander stands under the commander of the district, all the station commanders and the other firefighters in the district.

Fire stations are divided into three types: a regional station (also called "main station"), under which sub stations can be found ("small stations"). The purpose of the substations is to reduce the time of arrival of the teams and to respond to the event. If the sub-station staff, called for the event, needs immediate further assistance, it reports to the main station and sends additional aid teams. The number of crew members and the number of firefighters in the substations varies according to the quantity available to that district. There are sub stations with two firefighters and one fire truck, as opposed to substations with four firefighters and two fire engines, and so on. The firefighters in the substation must maintain their station, equipment, and fire engines in accordance with the Fire Department's orders, just as in the main station. There are several sub stations that operate in a seasonal format, especially during the summer months in areas where there are many fires.

Another type of station is the spatial station, which also has secondary stations, but it is a smaller station than the main station and the roles are smaller.

The training of firefighters in Israel takes place at the National Fire and Rescue School in its present form, starting in practice in early 1979.

From April 2011, the head of the IAA was headed by Shahar Ayalon, until May 2, 2016, when he was appointed general manager of the Israel Railways. [5] From May 2016 to March 2017, Deputy Commissioner Shimon Ben-Ner Acting Chief of Staff Didi Simchi – Firefighting and Rescue Commissioner and Chief Firefighter.

Most of the fire and rescue services as of 2018 are Rabbi Haim Pearl. In the past they served as rabbis David Simchon and Menachem Perl [6].

=== Districts ===
The Authority is composed of seven districts according to the geographic region. Each district is subject to a number of regional stations and sub-stations [7].

North

- Tiberias: The main regional station is located in the city of Tiberias. Sub stations: Kadouri, Tzemach Regional Center, Tzalmon.
- Yizre'el: The main regional station is located in the city of Nazareth. Sub-stations: Afula, Migdal Haemek, Yokneam Illit, Beit She'an, and Tzipori Industrial Park.
- Central Galilee: The main regional station is located in Karmiel. Sub-stations: Ma'alot-Tarshiha, Shfaram, Misgav, Tefen.
- Upper Galilee: The main regional station is located in Kiryat Shmona. Sub stations: Hatzor HaGlilit, Safed, Katzrin, Bnei Yehuda, Massadeh.

Carmel Coast Regional Council

- Haifa: The main regional station is located in the city of Haifa. Sub stations: Haifa Bay, Haifa – Anielewicz Street, Haifa – Heinrich Heine Square, Carmel Park, Haifa University, Kiryat Bialik, Tirat Carmel, Kiryat Tivon, Nesher, Usfiya.
- Hadera: The main regional station is located in Hadera. Sub-stations: Meirav, Zikhron Ya'akov, Umm al-Fahm, Or Akiva.
- Zevulun: The main station is located in Karmiel. Substation: Nahariya

Center

- Rishon LeZion: The main regional station is located in Rishon LeZion. Sub-stations: Rishon LeZion East-old industrial zone.
- Rehovot: The main regional station is located in Rehovot. Substations: Yavne, Gedera.
- Ayalon: The main regional station is located on the border of the cities of Ramla and Lod. Sub-stations: Modi'in-Maccabim-Reut, Shoham.
- Petah Tikva: The main regional station is located in Petah Tikva. Sub-stations: Yehud, Rosh Ha'ayin, Elad.
- HaSharon: The main regional station is located in Kfar Saba. Sub stations: Mitzpe Sapir ( Zur Yigal ).
- Netanya: The main regional station is located in Netanya. Sub stations: Kadima-Zoran.

Ben-Gurion Airport, as an extraterritorial zone, serves as an independent department for Ben-Gurion's fire department.

Dan

- Herzliya The main regional station is located in Herzliya. Sub stations: Ramat Hasharon.
- Holon The main regional station is located in Holon. Sub stations: Bat Yam.
- Givatayim The main regional station is located in Givatayim.
- Tel Aviv-Yafo consists of a main station on Shai Agnon Street and three substations: Jaffa (Ben Zvi Boulevard), Alon (Yigal Allon Street) and Kiryat Atidim Station (Habarzel Street).
- Ramat Gan The main regional station is located in Ramat Gan. Sub stations: The stock exchange.
- Bnei Brak The main regional station is located in Bnei Brak. Sub stations: Kiryat Ono.
- The oil refineries, as an extraterritorial area, serves as the fire department of the plant as an independent department.

Judea and Samaria

- Shomron section: The main regional station is located in Ariel. Sub-stations: Karnei Shomron, Shaked, Jordan Valley, Elkana.
- Judea Sector: The main regional station is located in Gush Etzion. Sub-stations: Kiryat Arba, Beitar Illit.
- Binyamin section: The main regional station is located in Ma'ale Adumim. Sub-stations: Mattityahu (Modi'in Illit), Giv'at Ze'ev, Ofra.

Jerusalem

- Jerusalem: The main regional station is located in Jerusalem ("Hill" in Givat Mordechai ). Five sub-stations – "Rimon" ( Romema ), "Homa" ( Har Homa ), "Pisga" ( Pisgat Ze'ev ), "Nation" ( Kiryat Ha'Leom ) and "Aguz" ( Wadi Joz ).
- Beit Shemesh: The main regional station is located in Beit Shemesh. Sub-stations: Ramat ( Ramat Bet Shemesh ), Maoz ( Mevasseret Zion), Hala ( Valley of the Ella ), Nachshon ( Tzalfon ), Harim ( Nes Harim ).

South

- Ashdod: The main regional station is located in the city of Ashdod. Sub-stations: Ad Halom (at the Mada station at the entrance to the city), Kiryat Malakhi, Gan Yavne.
- Ashkelon: The main regional station is located in Ashkelon. Sub-stations: Kiryat Gat, Sderot.
- Beersheba: The main regional station is located in Beersheba. Sub-stations: Ofakim, Netivot, Dimona, Arad, Tamar ( Sodom ), Rahat, Mitzpe Ramon, Yeruham.
- Eilat: The main regional station is located in Eilat. Substation: Near Kibbutz Yotvata.

=== Aerial firefighting ===
- 249 Squadron (Israel)- under the Israeli police under the behest of the fire and rescue services.

=== Ranks ===
Officers

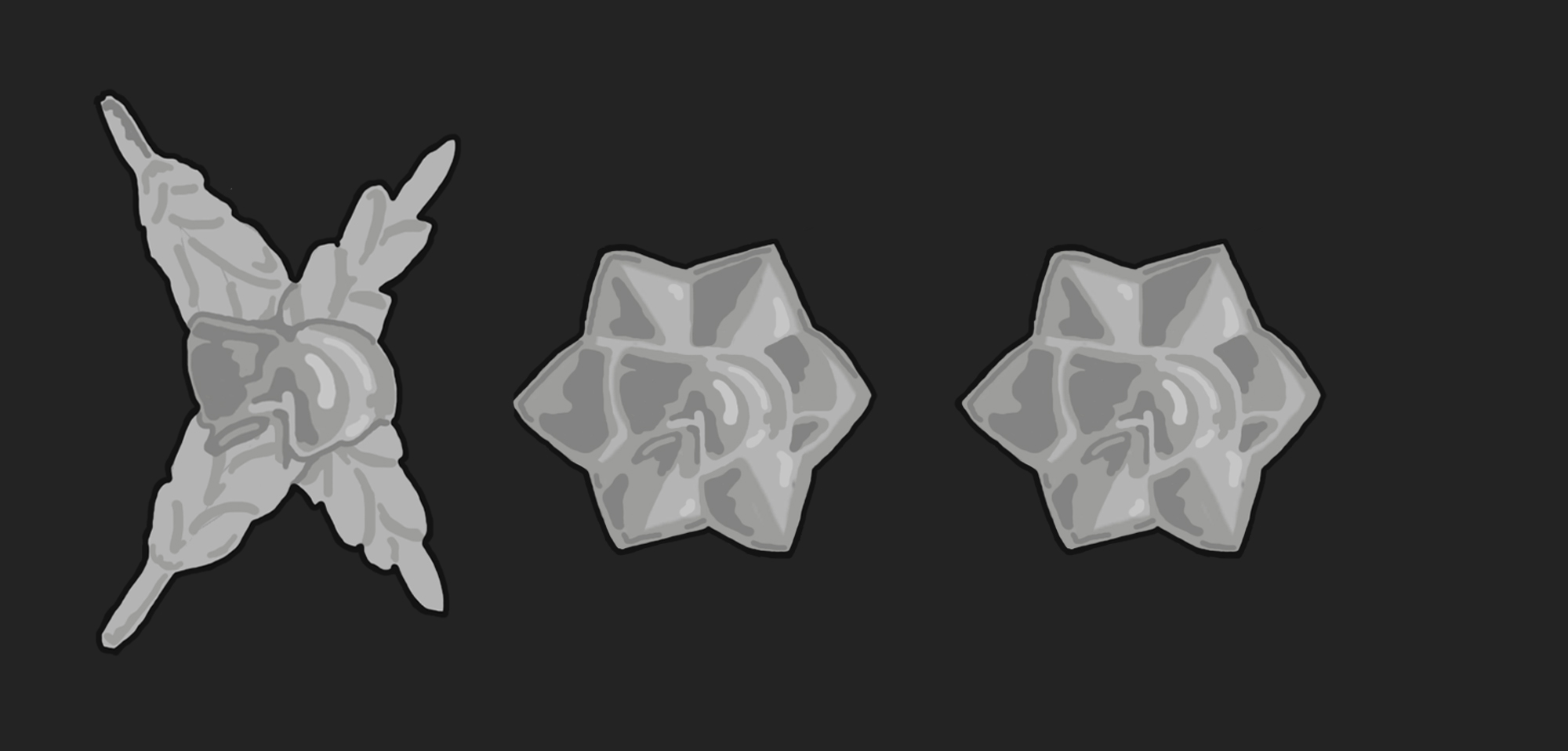
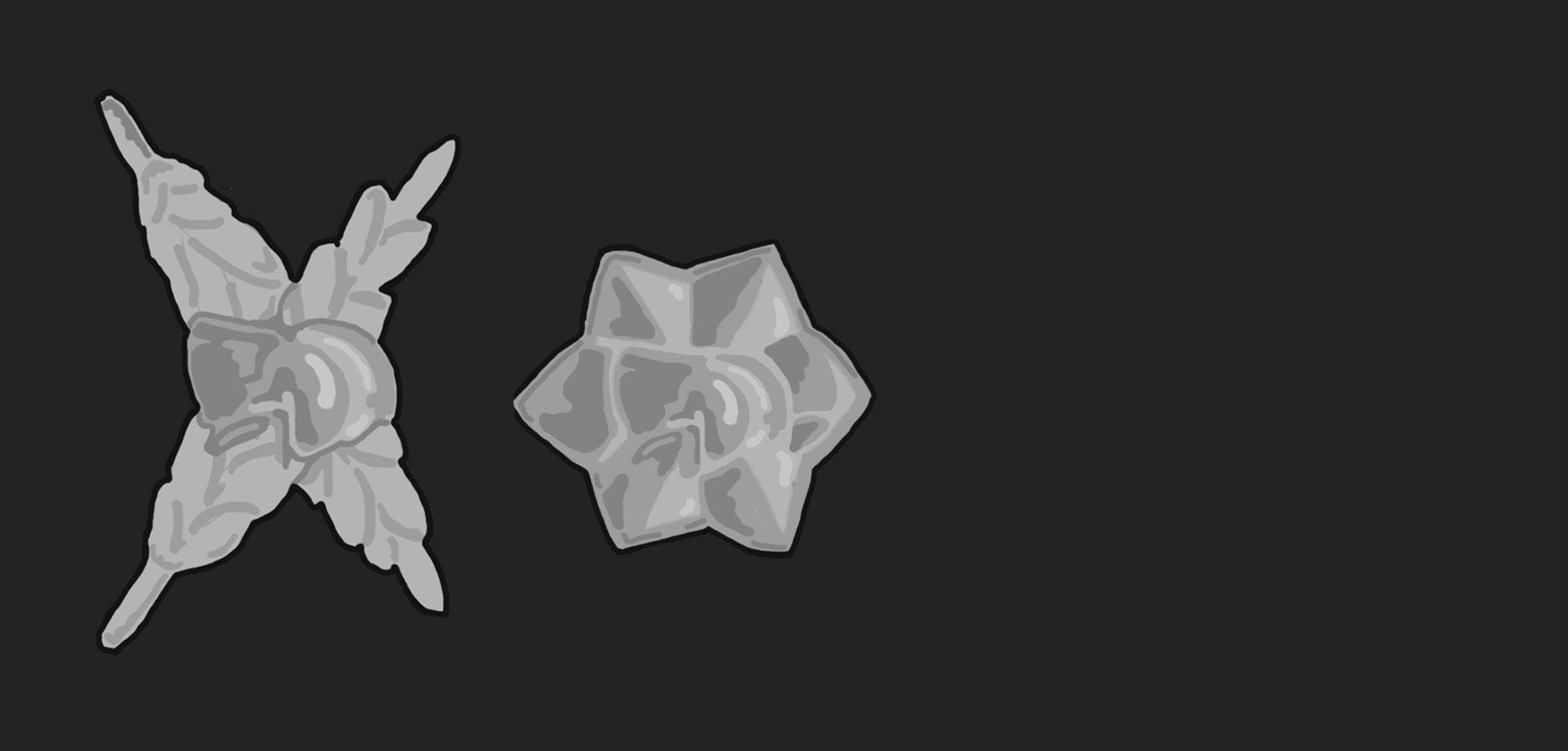
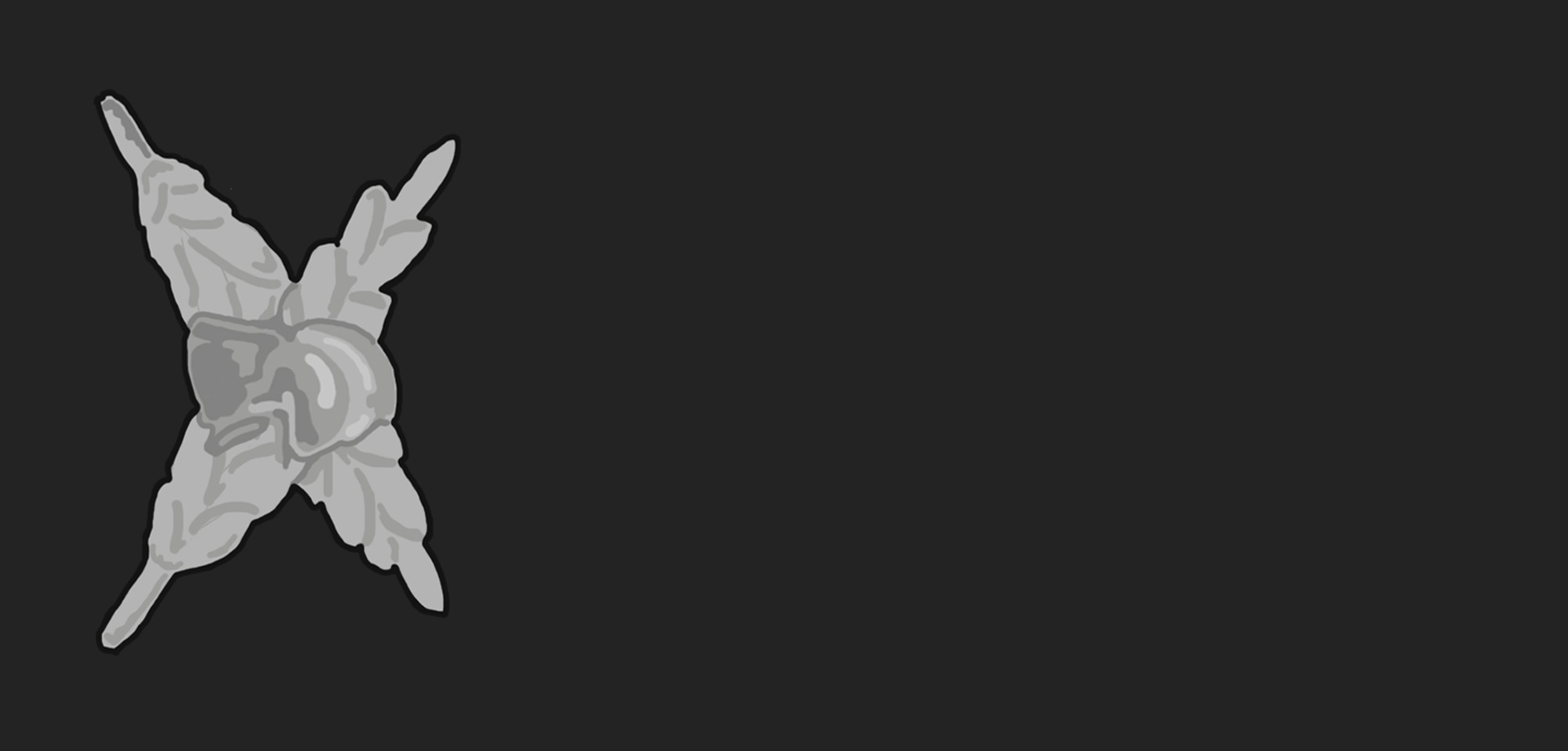
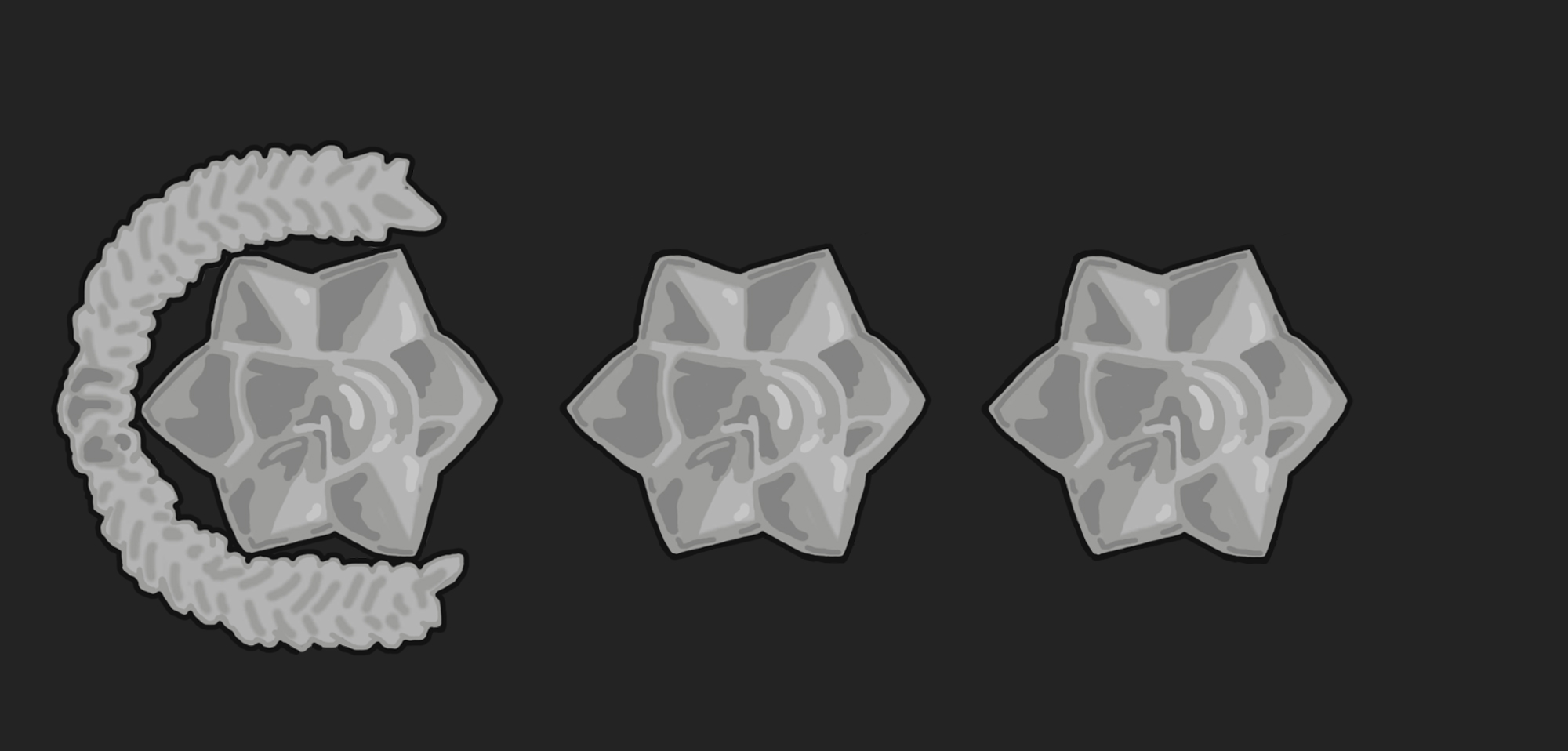
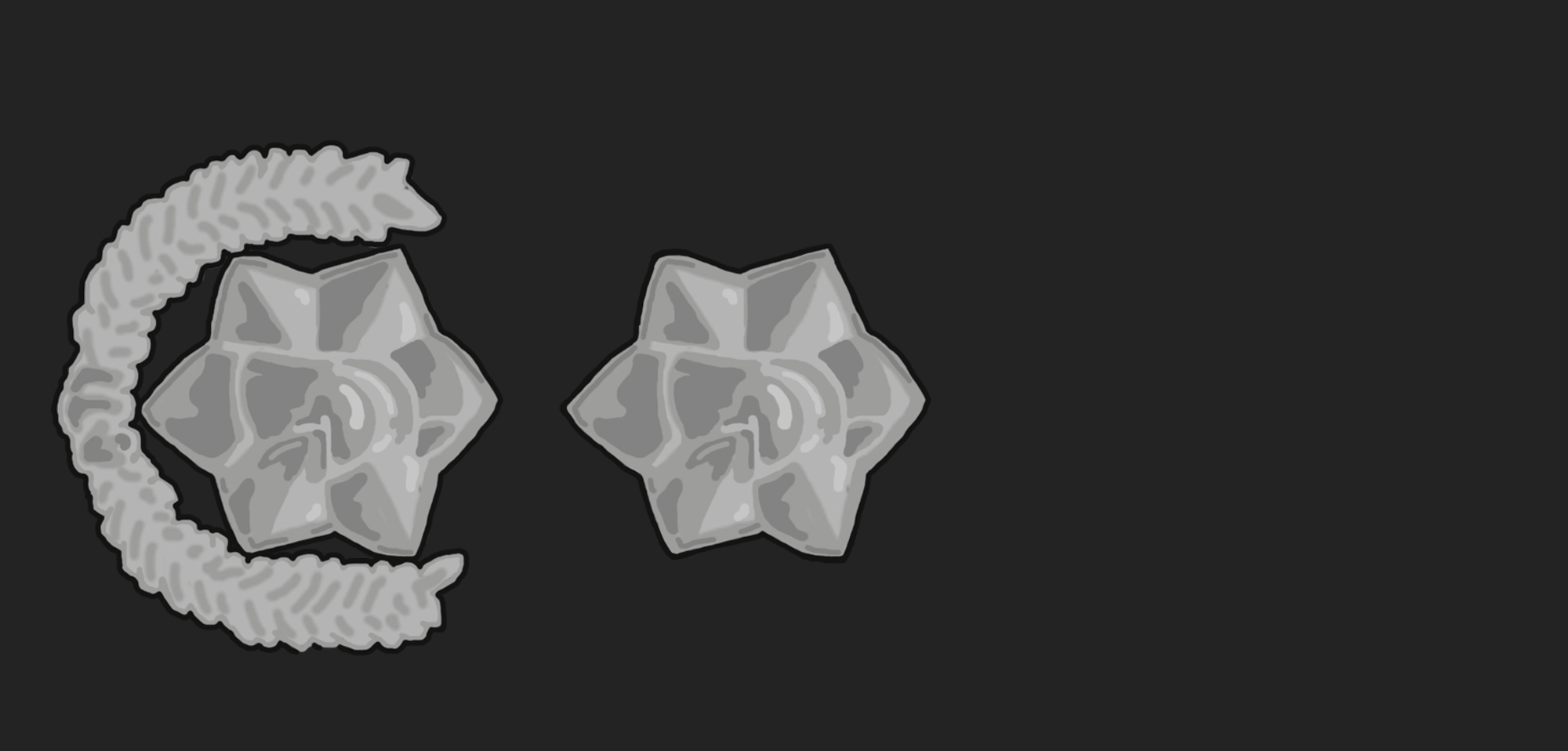
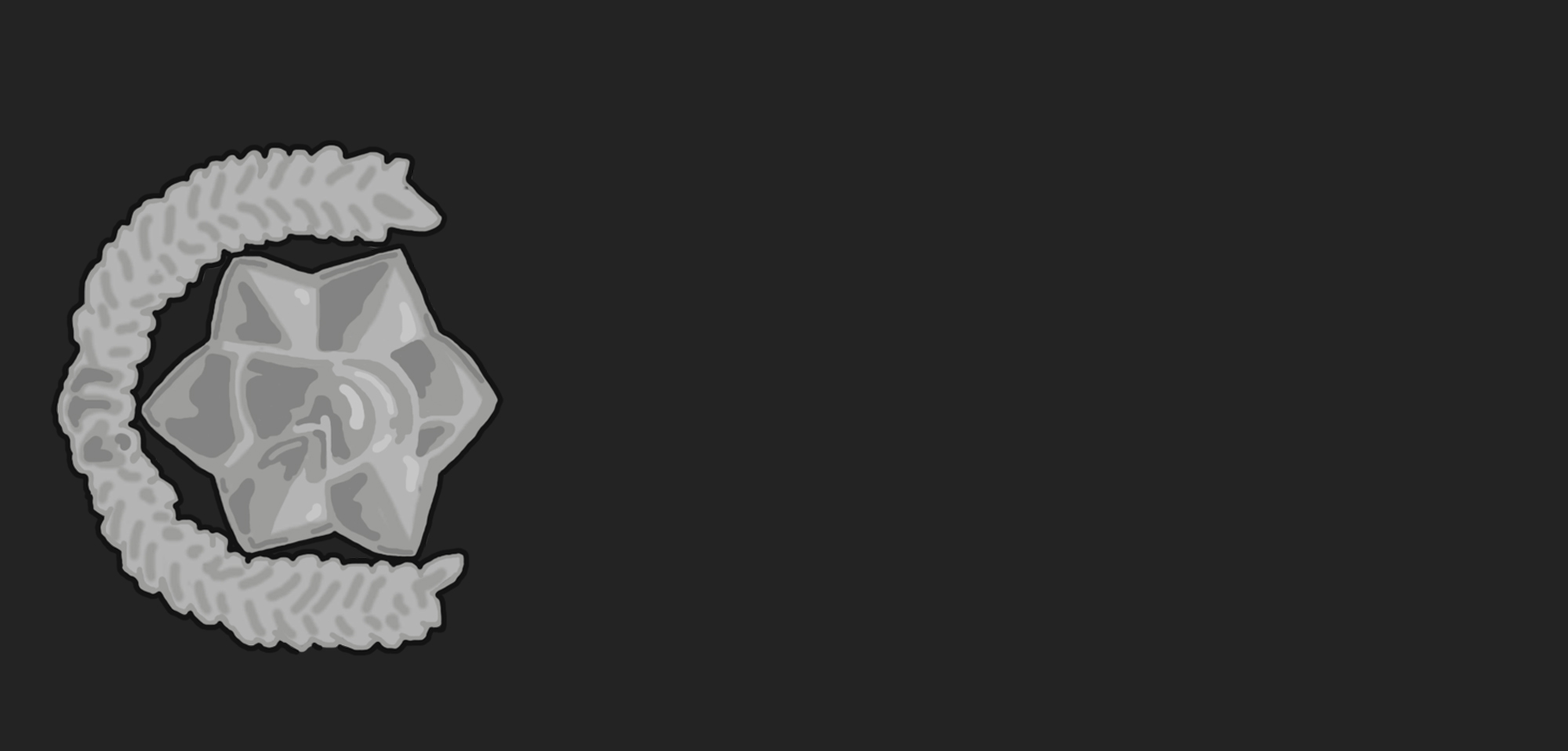
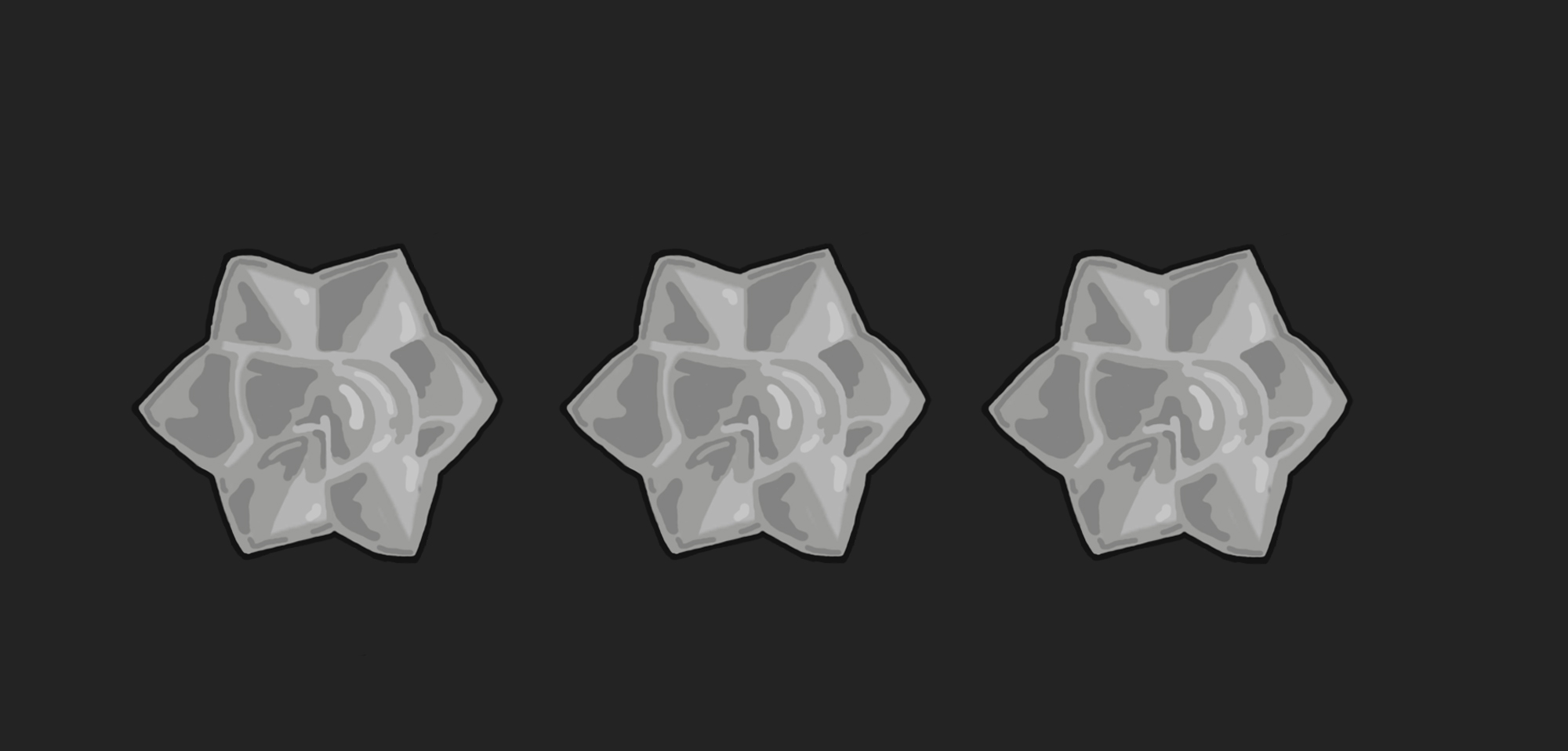
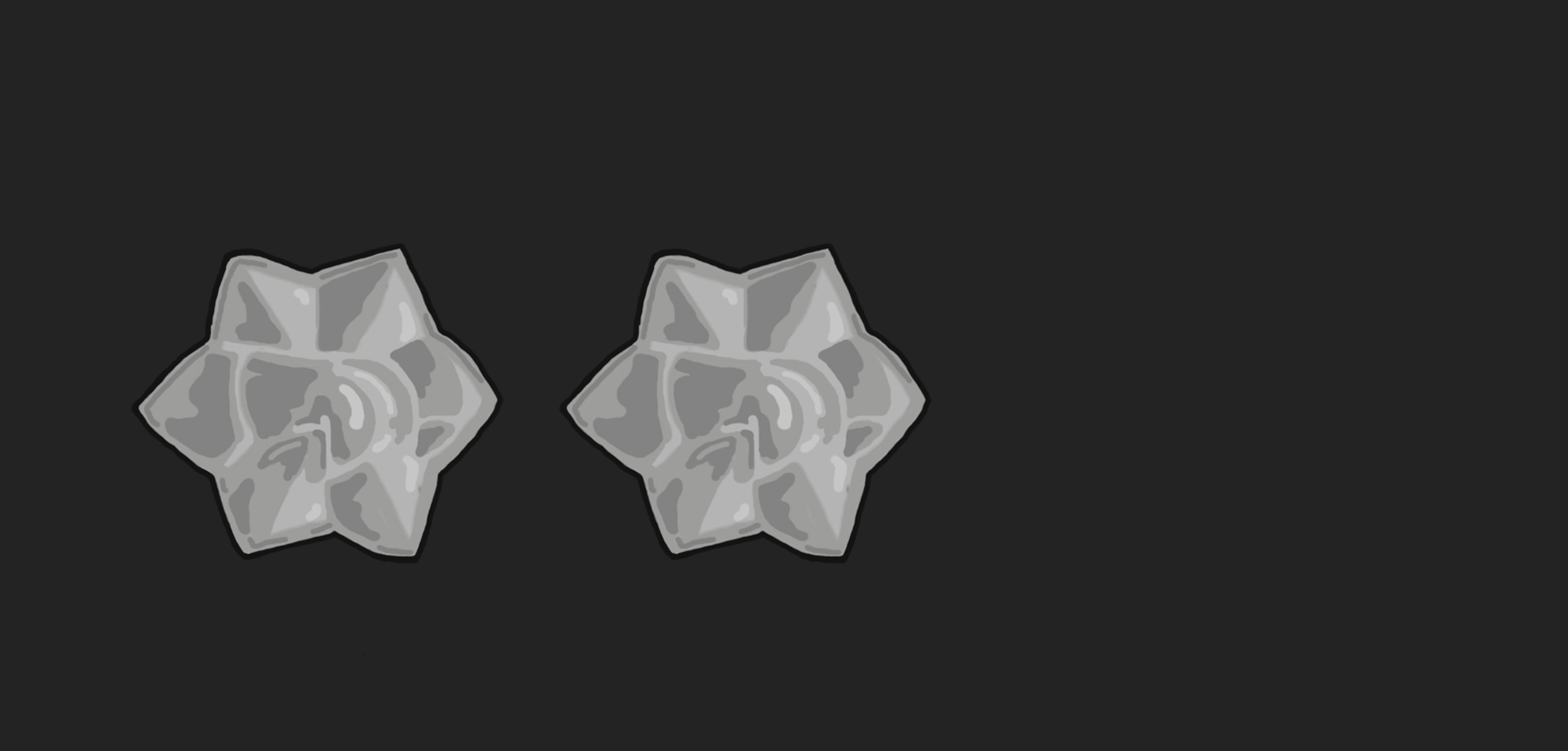
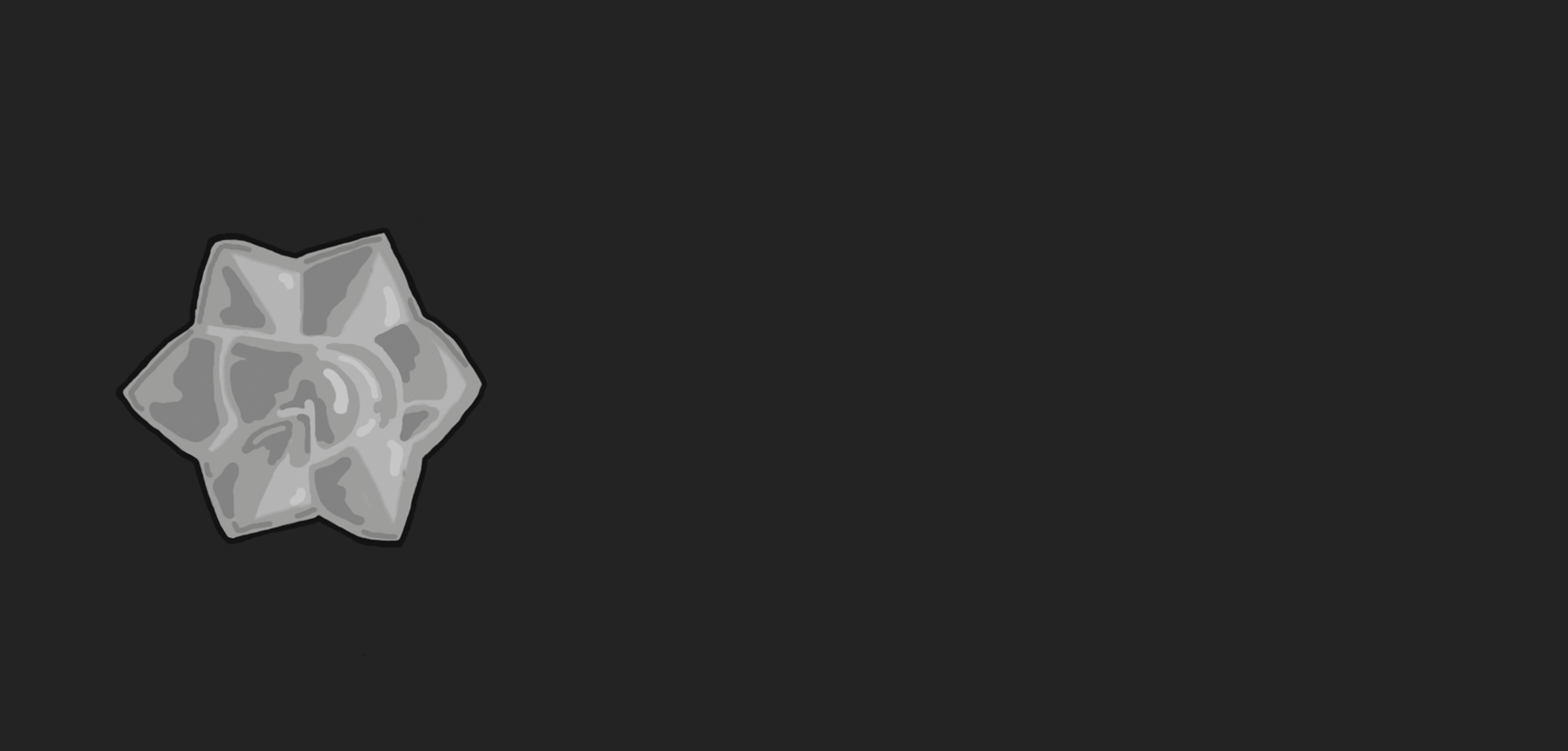
Israel Fire and Rescue Services
Israel Fire and Rescue Services	Rav tafsar (רב טפסר) (Fire Commissioner)	Tafsar (טפסר) (Assistant Fire Commissioner)	Tat tafsar (תת טפסר) (Assistant Deputy Fire Commissioner)	Tafsar mishne (טפסר משנה) (Fire Chief)	Segan tafsar (סגן טפסר) (Fire Deputy Chief)	Ráv Reshef (רב רשף) (Battalion Chief)	Reshef (רשף) (Captain)	Lahav (להב) (Lieutenant)	Lahav mishne (להב משנה) (Second Lieutenant)
English

Others

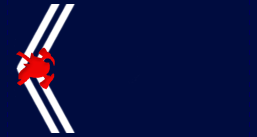
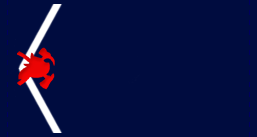
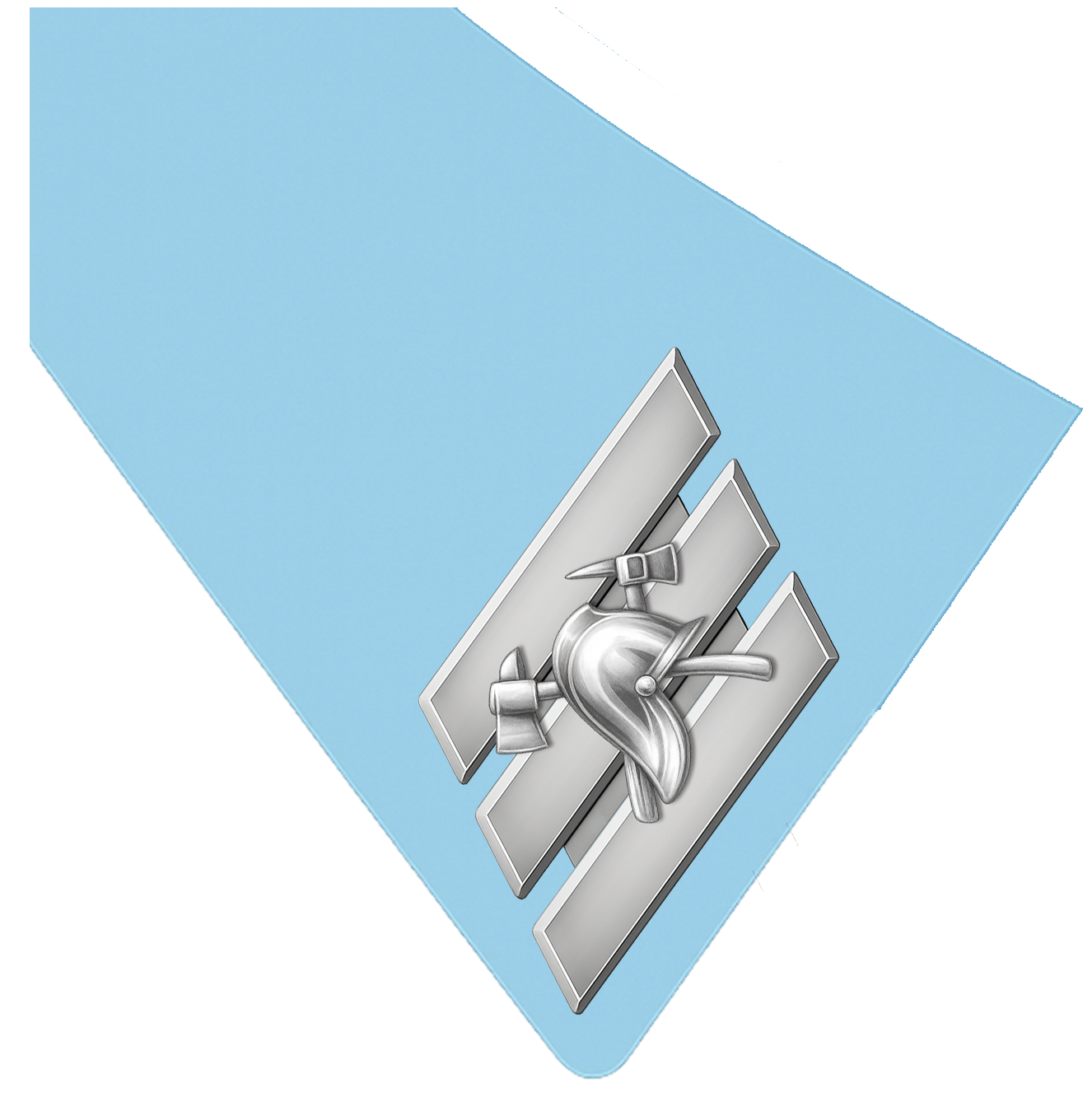
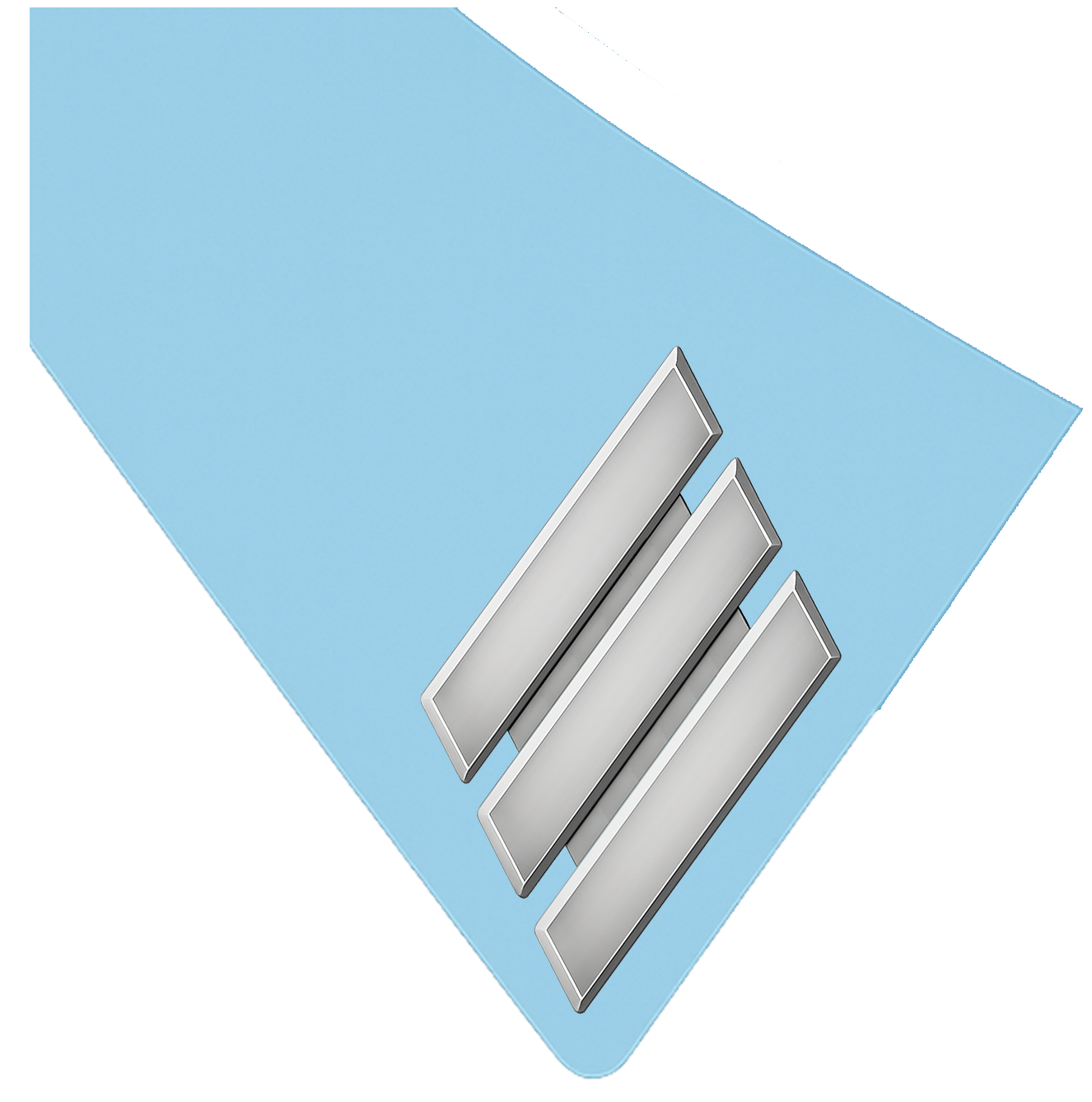
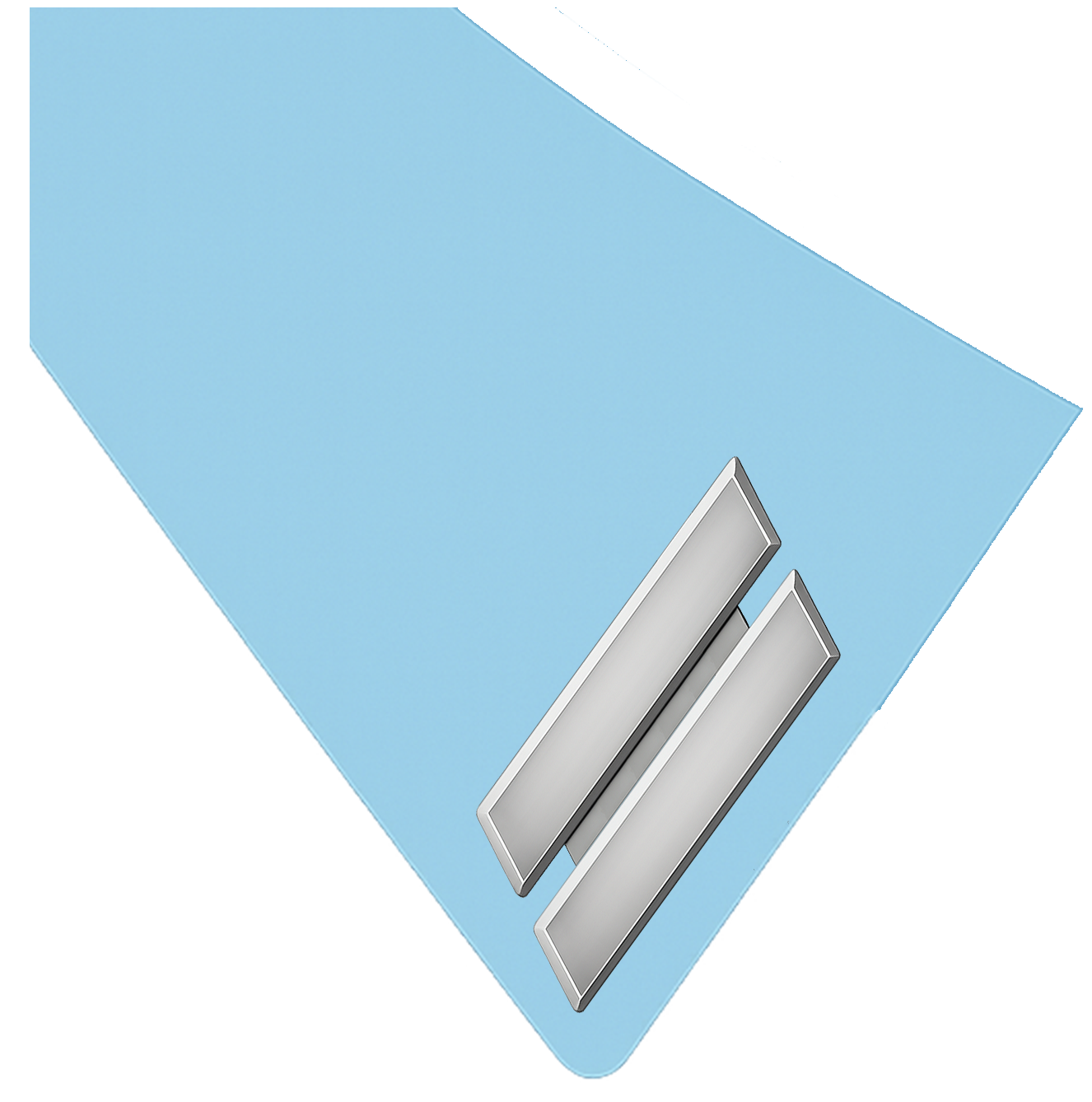
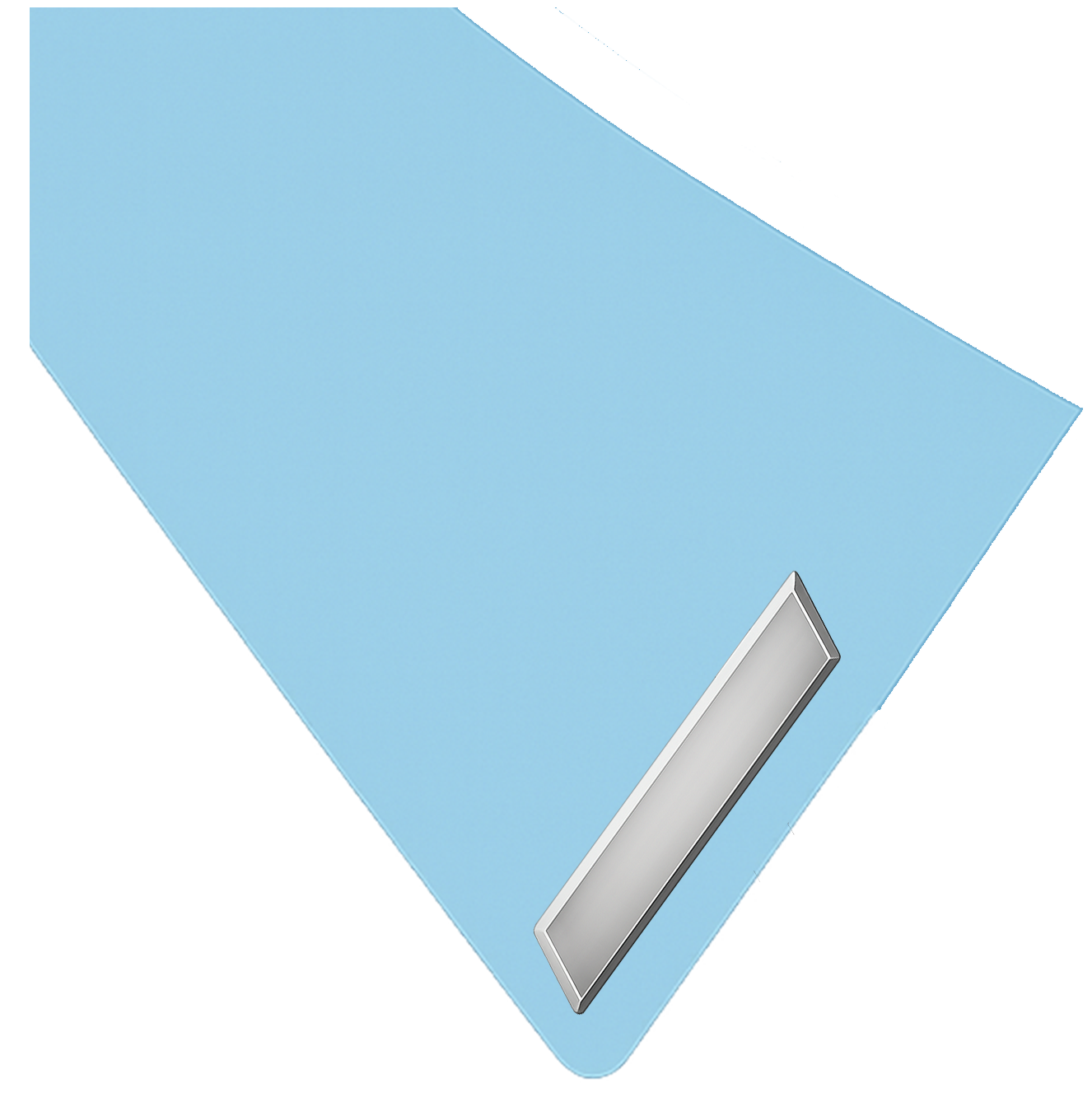
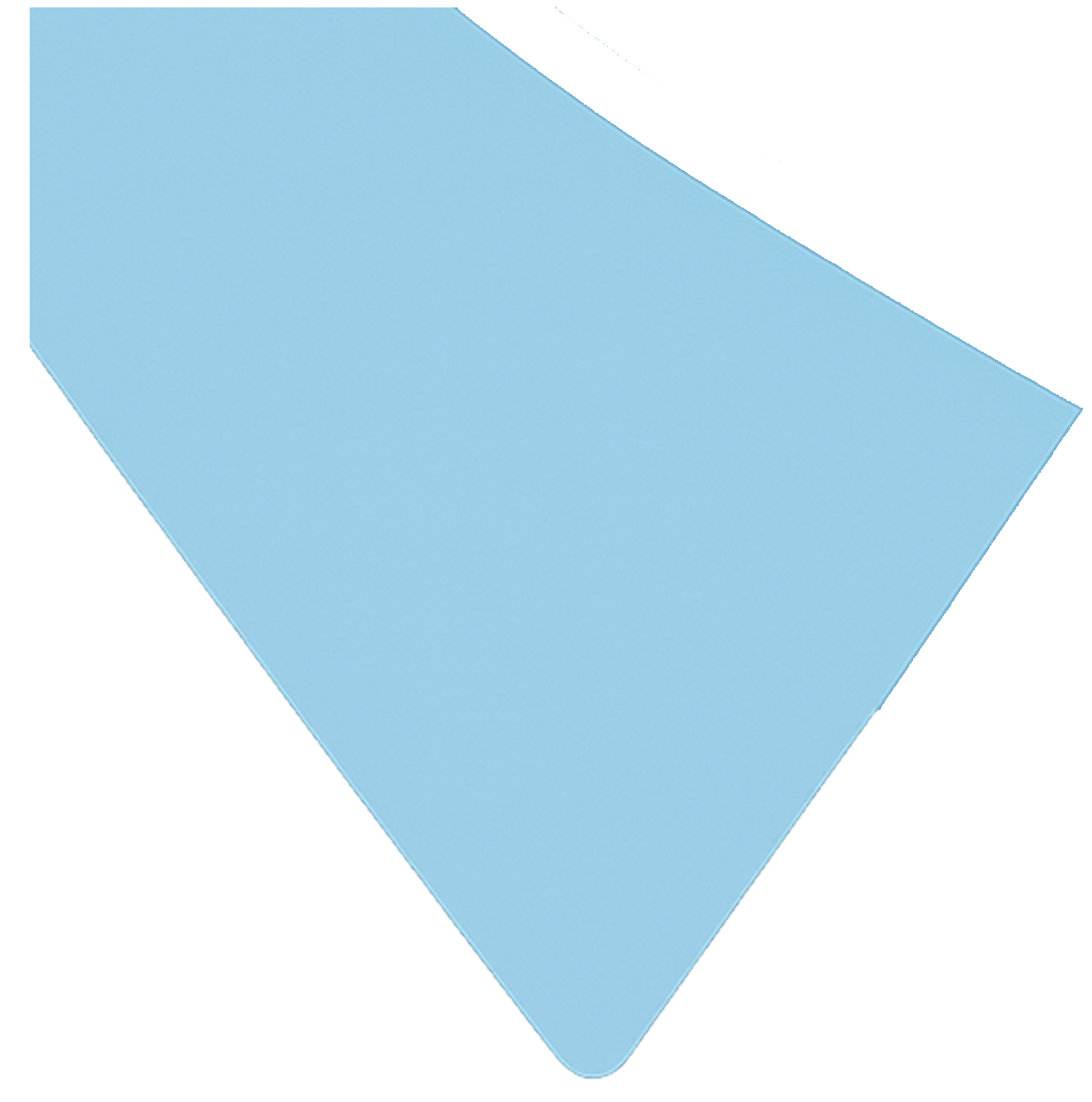
Israel Fire and Rescue Services
Israel Fire and Rescue Services	Rav semel bakhir kabai (רב-סמל בכיר-כבאי)	Rav semel rishon kabai (רב-סמל ראשון-כבאי)	Rav semel kabai (רב-סמל-כבאי)	Semel kabai (סמל כבאי)	Rav kabai (רב כבאי)	Lokhem esh rishon (לוחם אש ראשון)	Lokhem esh (לוחם אש)
English	Senior Sergeant Major Firefighter	First Sergeant Major Firefighter	Sergeant Major firefighter	Sergeant Firefighter	Corporal	Firefighter First Class	Firefighter

== Training ==
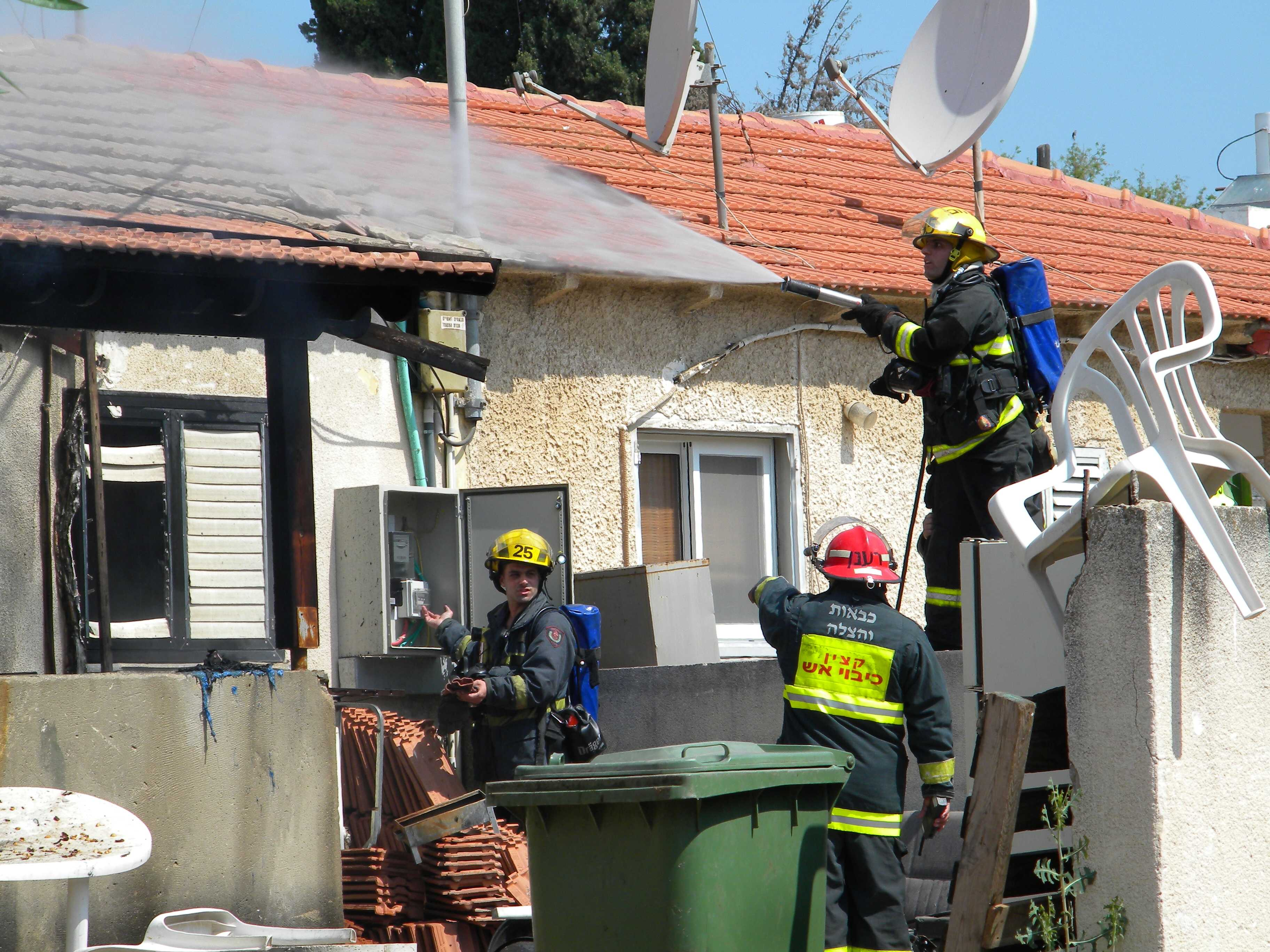
Israeli firefighters extinguish a fire in Ramat HaSharon

Israeli firefighters are trained at the Israel Fire and Rescue Academy in Rishon LeZion. Almost all Israeli firefighters are certified in Hazardous Materials response and handling, many of whom are trained in the world class Hazmat facilities in the Netherlands, and all have certifications in extrication, heavy rescue, heavy apparatus operation, wildland interface suppression, structure fire suppression and ventilation, as well as search and rescue.

A typical engine crew consists of two firefighters for an automatic fire alarm and other non-structure fire calls, and most structure fire responses consists of two engine crews, a truck company, and a medium-duty rescue/suppression truck that also doubles as a commander's vehicle. Larger incidents may also require a communications vehicle, heavy rescue apparatus, and additional support/command units.

Their radio systems operate on a Motorola Conventional Wide Band System and most firefighters also have beepers and/or motorola walkie-talkie phones.

== History ==
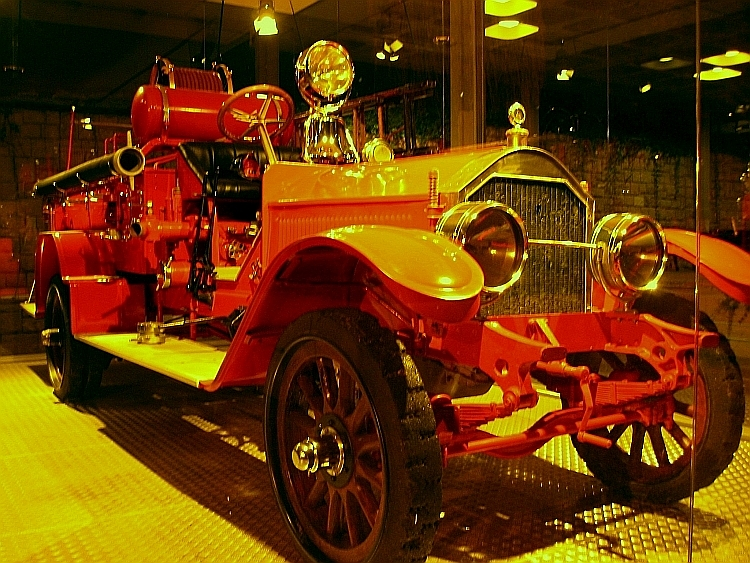
Vintage fire engine from 1917 at the Eretz Israel Museum, Tel Aviv

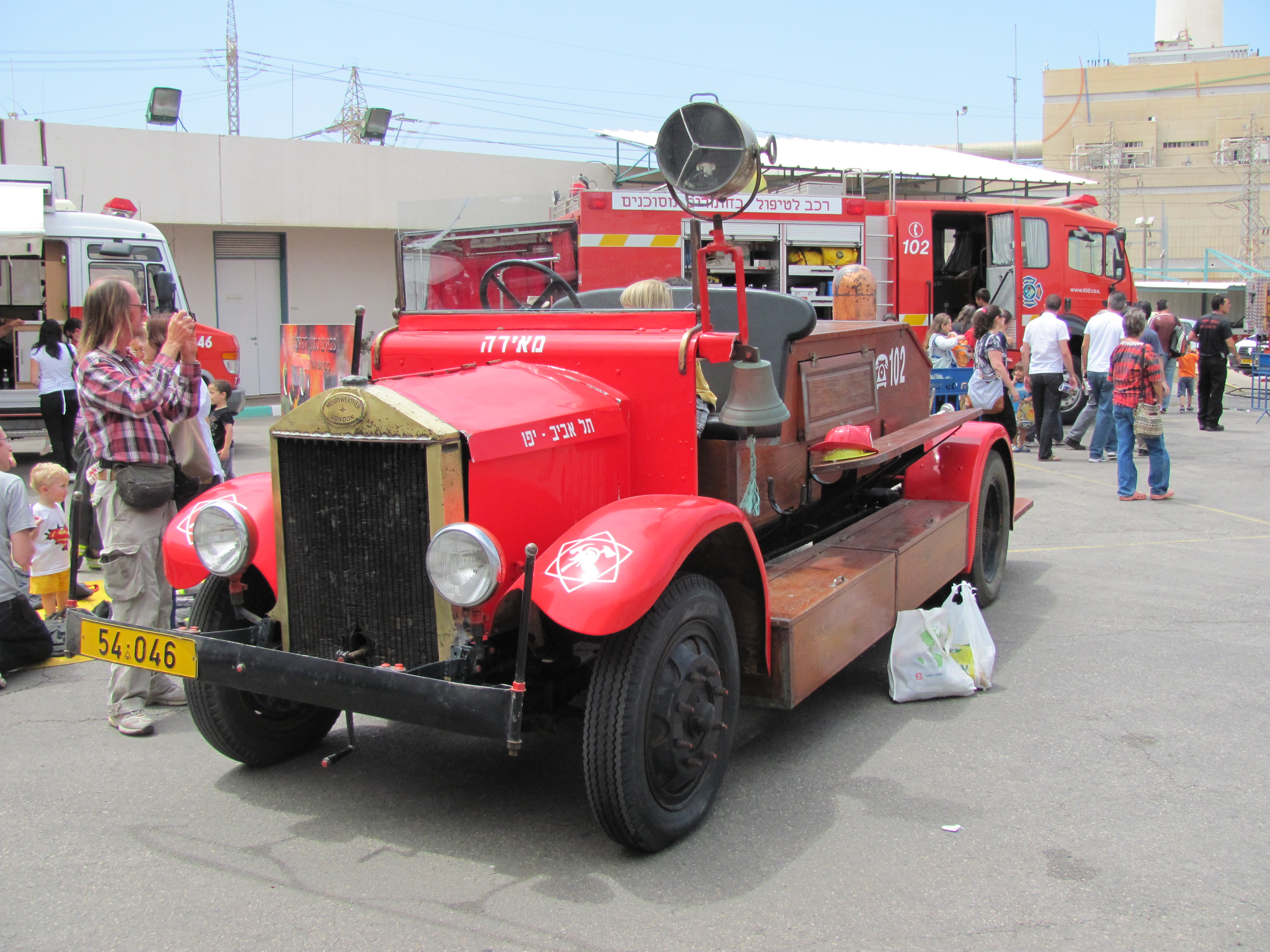
A vintage Merryweather fire truck used in Tel Aviv in the 1930s

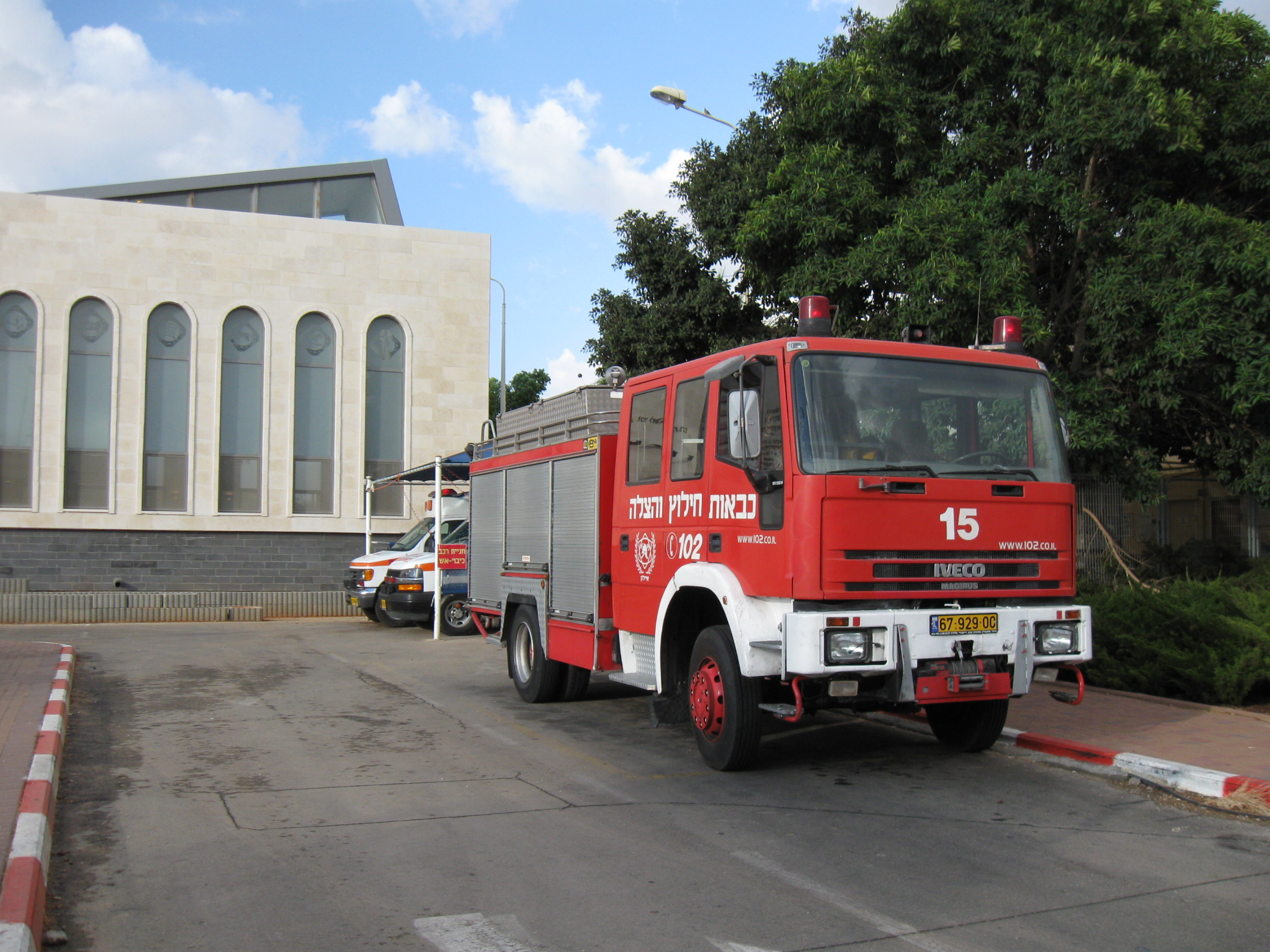
Israeli fire engine

After a fire in Zikhron Ya'akov in 1897, the first firefighting company was established by the Baron Rothschild. The company had 32 members, and equipment was brought from Paris, including pumps, hoses, ladders, axes and uniforms with shiny copper helmets and leather belts.

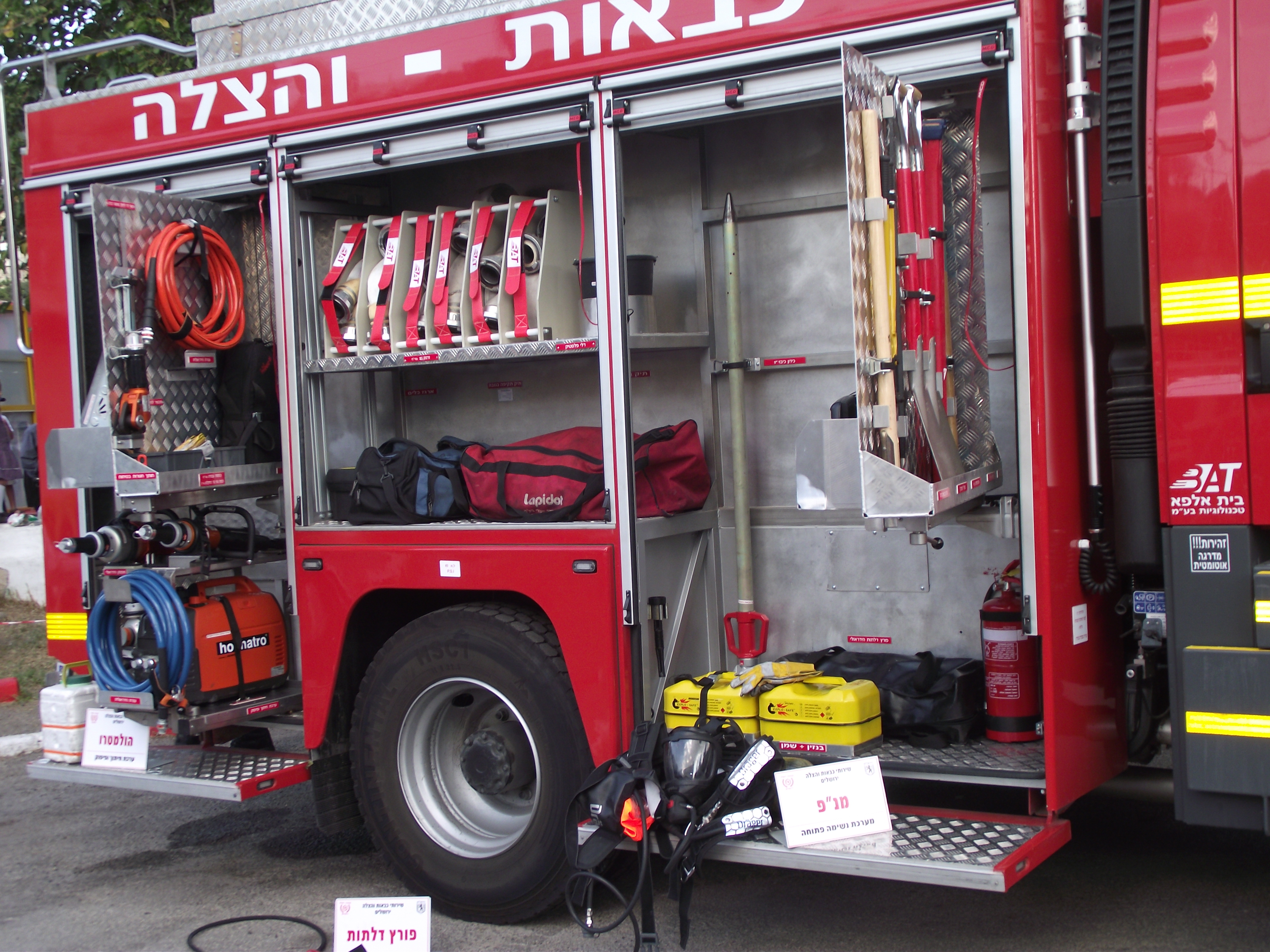
Typical equipment of an Israeli fire engine on display

Another company was formed in Tel Aviv in 1925 following a flood in the Brenner neighbourhood, and was based in the first dedicated fire station in the country, a shed near the police station. Throughout the following years, more firefighting companies and fire stations were established throughout the Yishuv. By Israeli independence in 1948 there were fire stations in most Jewish settlements; Petah Tikva, Jerusalem, Haifa, Hadera, Rehovot, Nahariya, Bnei Brak, Ramat Gan, Givatayim, Afula, Herzliya, Kfar Saba, Holon, Netanya and Rishon LeZion.

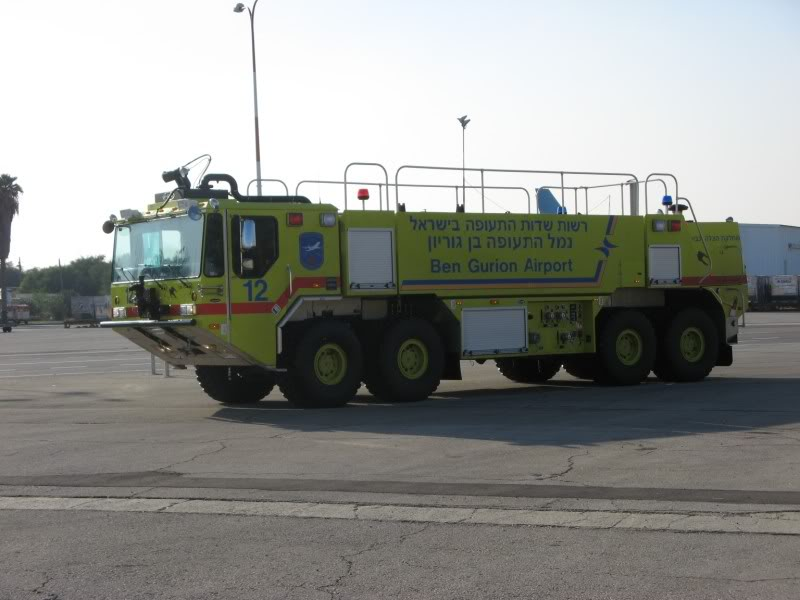
Airport fire truck at Ben Gurion Airport

After Israeli independence, fire stations were built in several other cities, including Acre and Beersheba, at Lod Airport, the oil refineries in Haifa and at the Port of Haifa and Port of Ashdod.

The Firefighting Services Law was passed in 1959 and took effect in 1960. It established a fully professional firefighting force, as until then, firefighters had previously been volunteers.

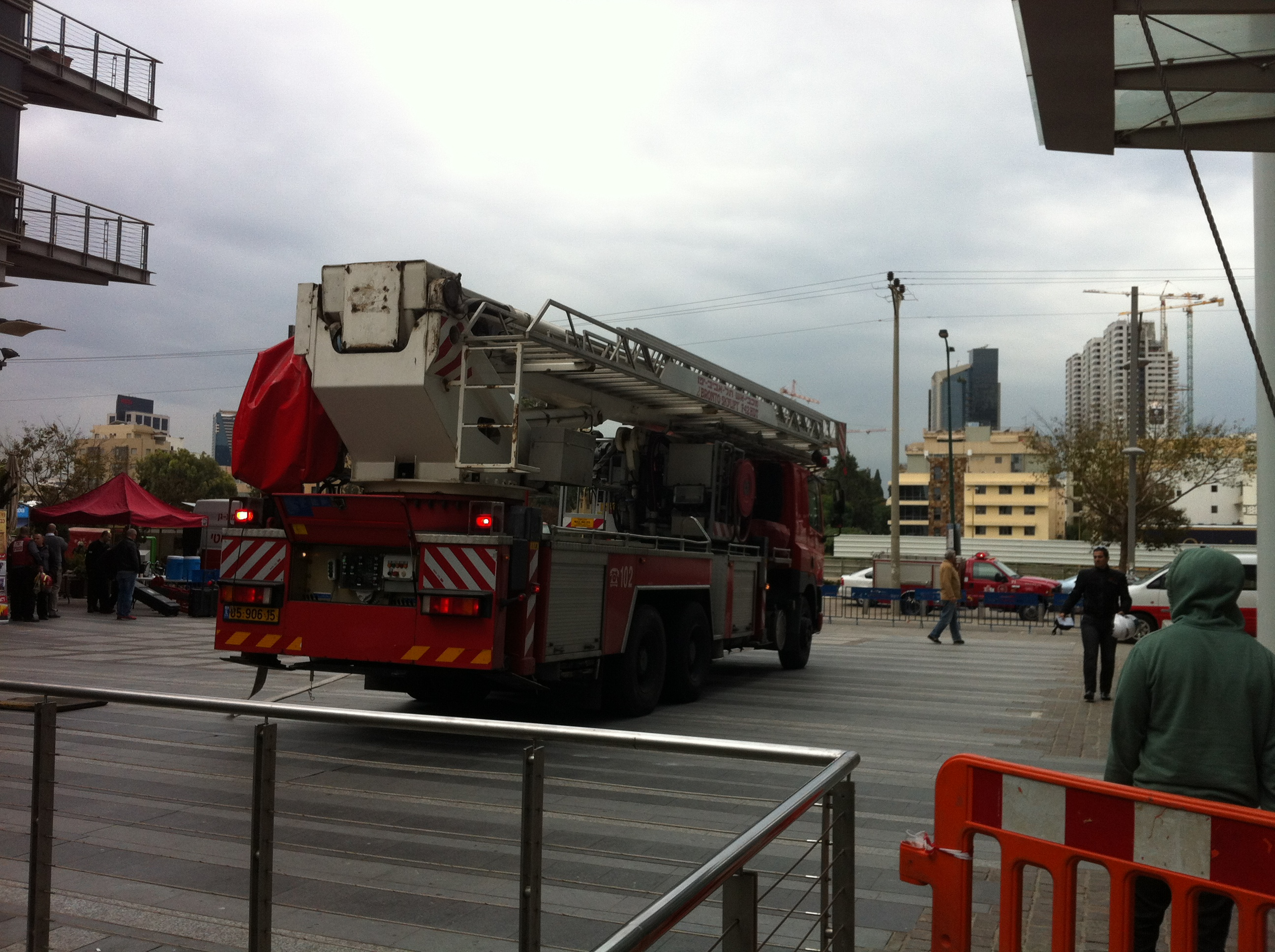
Ladder truck

Israel Fire and Rescue Services operates 5 fire stations in Jerusalem. The main station is in Givat Mordechai, with branches in Romema, Wadi al-Joz, Givat Ram and Neve Ya'akov.

After the 2010 Mount Carmel forest fire, Israel's fire and rescue services have been transformed and upgraded from a municipal-based structure into a national force. The Israeli government nationalized the Fire and Rescue Services. Until then, the fire services had been operated by local authorities, which billed citizens for their services. Following the reform, the state finances the service as part of the government budget. It was announced that the reform would streamline efficiency and upgrade services. As a result of the reform, the fire service purchased dozens of new fire engines and new equipment, and an eight-aircraft strong firefighting squadron (expected to grow to 14) was established. All firefighters and rescue personnel became government employees under the Ministry of National Security.

== Appliances and Equipment ==
Firefighting and Rescue Vehicles in Firefighting Services

- Caesar – Vehicle Commander The Chief Firefighting and Rescue Officer (GMC) or regional command vehicle – serves as a mobile operations room during a multi-dimensional event.
- Abir – Light Rescue Vehicle. A vehicle used in most cases for various rescue and rescue operations, such as accidents.
- Alon – a vehicle for extinguishing forest fires and a grove suitable for traffic on narrow roads and hard areas, equipped with fire extinguishing equipment in open areas
- Sela – command vehicle commander and deputy service for their operational use.
- Vulcan – a rescue vehicle and light hazardous materials. Contains variable extraction equipment and equipment for handling hazardous materials.
- Vehicle for monitoring activities at hazardous materials event Vehicles The vehicle carries monitoring devices that enable the monitoring of hazardous substances
- Almog – a vehicle for the treatment of hazardous materials containing special equipment (suits, sealing equipment, pumping equipment, etc.) for the treatment of leakage / spills of hazardous materials.
- Ga'ash – a rescue and rescue vehicle with equipment and means for dealing with road accidents, rescue from heights, demolitions, flooding and lighting.
- Nesher – A dedicated fire-fighting and rescue vehicle of the crane type with a loading basket, a water cannon for extinguishing and additional equipment. At varying heights – 38 to 42 meters.
- Hawk – a dedicated fire-fighting and rescue vehicle with a lift ladder, a water cannon for extinguishing additional equipment. Different hawks also contain three cubic meters of water. Their height varies from 30 to 37 meters.
- Saar – a standard fire-fighting and rescue vehicle containing different fire extinguishing equipment, three cubic meters and 300 liters of foam concentrate, ladders and other equipment. This vehicle is the most common vehicle and is launched first for any event. Also called in the professional jargon – an initial exit vehicle.
- Rotem – a fire and rescue vehicle for initial intervention. Usually a Ford or Chevrolet pickup truck. Contains limited fire extinguishing equipment and contains a water cistern and 30 liters foam concentrate. The main advantage of this vehicle is the speed of its arrival at the event.
- Eshed – a dedicated fire truck for water supply. Contains fire extinguishing equipment and varying water amounts between 12 and 13 cubic meters of water and foam concentrate.
- Lightning – a light fire engine. Includes extinguishing equipment and water quantity of one cubic meter. Most commonly used in forest and forest fires.
- Fire Extinguisher – A light and quick fire extinguisher, with good surface offenses, contains a variable water quantity of up to 200 liters, a rolling roller and a small water pump. Used in field and forest fires.
- Trailing air bank – A compressor is installed on it to fill air-breathing vessels for teams operating in multi-dimensional fires. Is towed to the scene by another fire truck and operated by the firefighter at the scene.
- Trailing water cannon and foam – drag on it installed a high water cannon or foam. Was dragged to the scene by another fire truck. He must receive water from a fire truck because he does not have a water pump.
- Hoses supply vehicle – a vehicle containing various water hoses for the use of large-scale fires.

The fire engines and other equipment change from station to station. Each station can purchase different types of vehicles according to its needs. Types of fire engines also vary (Mercedes, Man, Iveco, DAF, E-ONE, etc.). The equipment in fire engines must be in accordance with a standard set by the Firefighting and Rescue Commission, but every station may equip its vehicles with additional equipment according to its needs.

In addition, a motorcycle can be used to extinguish the fire, which is used to respond quickly to extinguishing fires.
