= 249 Squadron (Israel) =

249th Squadron
- טייסת 249
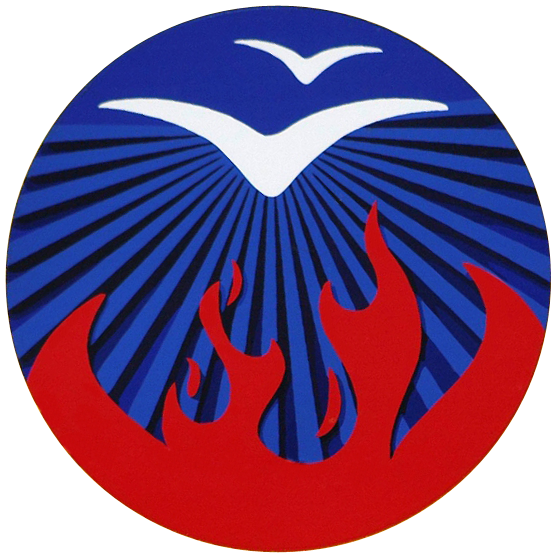
- Logo of the Squadron
- Active: January 2011 - present
- Country: Israel
- Allegiance: Israel Fire and Rescue Services
- Branch: Israeli Air Force; Israeli police
- Type: Aerial firefighting squadron
- Role: Aerial firefighting and reconnaissance
- Garrison/HQ: Sde Dov Airport
- Nickname(s): Elad Squadron

Aircraft flown
- Helicopter: Air Tractor AT-802F; Airbus H-125 Aquarail; Airbus H-145

249 Squadron is an Aerial firefighting unit of the Israel Fire and Rescue Services operated by Israeli Police. It was established in 2011 as an Israeli Air Force squadron. It is nicknamed "Elad Squadron" after a late 16 year old firefighter of the Israel Fire and Rescue Services.

== Background ==
In 2010 Mount Carmel forest fire took place, which was a turning point that led to a change in the face of the firefighting system in Israel. Until this fire, the firefighting system was built in a decentralized manner under local authorities and city associations under the responsibility of the Ministry of the Interior. Despite many complaints about a continuous shortage of equipment and personnel and despite advices that indicated that the firefighting system should be nationalized, the advices were not implemented and the main firefighting and rescue body in Israel continued to become obsolete and accumulate gaps.

In the field of aerial firefighting, the firefighting services until 2000 were based on the Israeli Air Force, which operated Sikorsky CH-53 Sea Stallion Yassor helicopters for firefighting purposes using portable water tanks . After it was found that this form of work causes damage to the rotor and chassis of the helicopter, the Israeli Air Force's activity was stopped and transferred to private companies that provide agricultural spraying services (first the Chem-Nir company and then the Talm company) who provided this service in a contract under the command of the fire services.

After the fire in Carmel, as part of the lessons learned from the disaster, a decision was made to establish a firefighting squadron in the Israeli Air Force.

On December 7, 2010, even before the formation of the squadron, Prime Minister Benjamin Netanyahu announced that the firefighting squadron that the State of Israel will establish will be called the "Elad" squadron, after Elad Rivan, a 16-year-old firefighter from Haifa, who perished in the disaster while together with the fire team he worked.

In early 2011, the Israeli government approved the transfer of the firefighting system from the Ministry of the Interior to the Ministry of Defense and the establishment of an aerial firefighting squadron.

== History ==
=== Establishment ===
In January 2011, the Government of Israel decided to establish an aerial firefighting squadron for the State of Israel. Since the Israeli Air Force was the only body that had the knowledge and experience to establish a squadron out of nowhere, the task was assigned to it. In a tender published by the Ministry of Defense, Elbit Systems won, so the government purchased firefighting planes and hired the Chem-Nir company to carry out the task.

=== Air Force Squadron ===
The Israeli Air Force, which was the guiding professional body, established the 249 Squadron - Firebirds which had a belief in building combat theory for firefighting from the air and directing the firefighting pilots from the ground. The firefighting pilots of the Chem-Nir company carried out the actual firefighting operations, in accordance with the instructions and procedures of the Israeli Air Force.

The base of the firefighting squadron was determined in Sde Dov Airport. Also, two main airstrips were determined from which the firefighting planes took off. The Megiddo runway in the north and the Kedama runway in the south. In just four months, 8 firefighting planes were purchased and the foundation stones for a firefighting squadron in the State of Israel were laid.

=== Expansion ===
On January 5, 2015, Elbit Systems Company, which received from the Ministry of Defense the contract for the purchase of the planes and the operation of the firefighting squadron, announced the signing of a contract that will be spread over eight years and will also include payment for flight hours, infrastructure upgrades, maintenance, operation of runways, treatment of flame retardant materials and other aspects of Activation of the squadron. As part of this contract, Elbit Systems purchased 6 more firefighting planes, thus increasing the total number of the squadron planes to 14.

=== Transfer ===
After the formation of the squadron and the laying of the foundations for its operational work it was decided to transfer it to Israeli Police (to provide services to Israel Fire and Rescue Services)

On November 1, 2016, responsibility for operating the squadron was transferred to the Israeli Police.

=== 2016 Israel fires ===
The squadron participated in the firefighting operations during the November 2016 Israel fires.

=== Transfer ceremony ===
On January 19, 2017, at the end of five and a half years of operational activity in the Air Force, the Air Fire Unit moved to operate under the Israel Police Air Unit officially, in a solemn ceremony held at the Megiddo Airstrip.

=== 2018 Gaza conflict ===
During the 2018 Gaza conflict, the squadron was deployed to put up the fires near the perimeter fence around the Gaza Strip as a result of sending incendiary kites.

=== 2019 Israel fires ===
During 2019, the unit's personnel made 200 sorties and dumped 700,000 liters of water and flame retardants to put out fires. In addition to the extinguishing operations, the members of the unit assisted the ground forces in directing and mapping burn areas.

=== 2020 Israel fires ===
Firefighting planes from the squadron helped put out fires that broke out in various locations in Israel due to heavy heat in May 2020, carrying out more than a hundred sorties .

=== 2021 Firefighting missions ===
Firefighting planes from the Elad squadron assisted in putting out fires in Cyprus in July 2021 and in Greece in August 2021. Firefighting planes and several helicopters were involved in putting out the 2021 Israel wildfires.

== Structure ==
The operation of the unit is determined in the following configuration:

- The "Elbit Systems" company, which won the tender with the Ministry of Defense, is responsible for the operation and maintenance of the aerial firefighting planes
- Chem Nir, a subcontractor of Elbit Systems, is responsible for providing pilots, mechanics and civilian ground crews.
- Israeli Police - responsible for air management.
- Israel Fire and Rescue Services - the operational activities are coordinated under the Israel Fire and Rescue Services

== Equipment ==
The squadron operates:

- 14 Air Tractor AT-802F firefighting planes
- 4 Airbus H-125 Aquarail helicopters
- 2 Airbus H-145 helicopters

== Sources & References ==
- יחידת הכיבוי האווירי, on the website of the Israel Fire and Rescue Services
- "יחידת כיבוי מבצעית". Israel Air Force (in Hebrew). 12 May 2011.
- "מה בוער?". Israel Air Force (in Hebrew). 3 March 2015.
