= 2010 Mount Carmel forest fire =

2010 forest fire in northern Israel

Mount Carmel Forest Fire
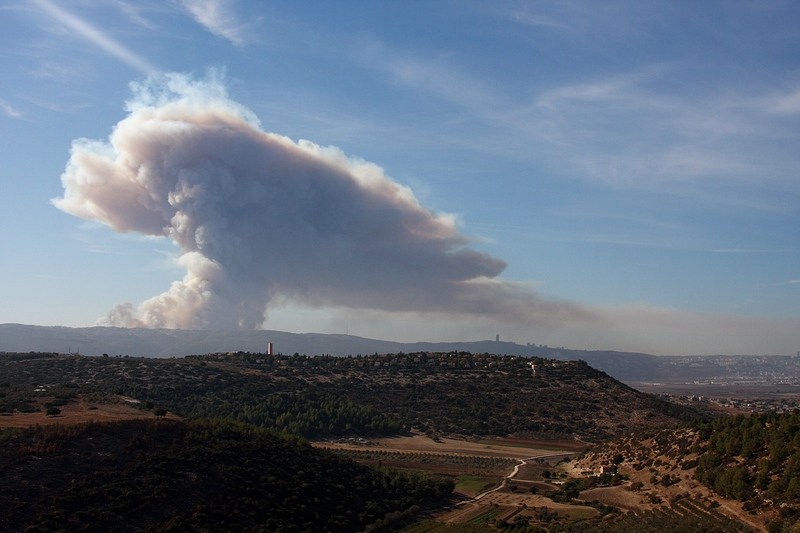
- The fire in its early stages (looking west)
- Date: 2–6 December 2010; 11:00 am; (UTC+2)
- Location: Mount Carmel, Israel
- Coordinates: 32°43′59″N 35°2′59″E

Statistics
- Burned area: Over 50,000 dunams (50 km^{2}; 5,000 ha; 12,000 acres)

Impacts
- Deaths: 44
- Injuries: Dozens
- Evacuated: 17,000
- Structures destroyed: 74
- Cost: ≈₪250 million

Ignition
- Cause: Negligent use of a hookah

Map
- Location within Haifa region of Israel Location within Israel

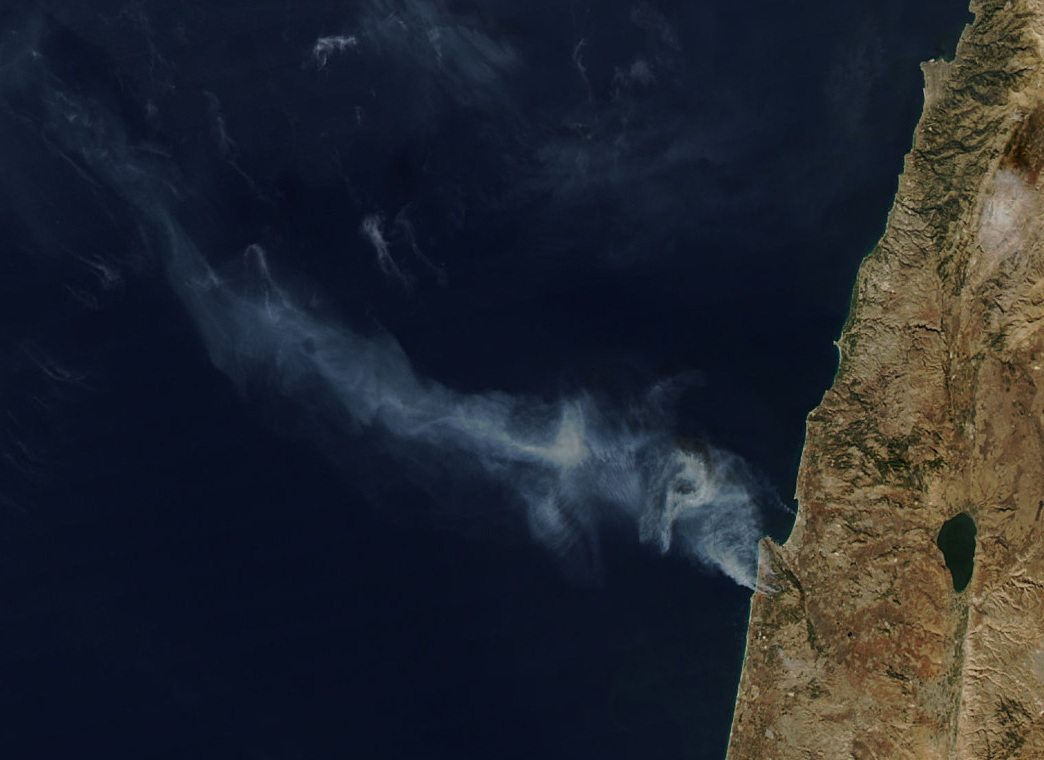
A view from NASA's Aqua satellite taken on December 3, 2010

The Mount Carmel Forest Fire (Hebrew: אסון הכרמל Ason HaKarmel, "The Carmel Disaster") was a deadly forest fire that started on Mount Carmel in northern Israel, just south of Haifa. The fire began at about 11:00 local time on 2 December 2010, and spread quickly, consuming much of the Mediterranean forest covering the region. With a death toll of 44, it was the deadliest civil disaster in Israeli history until the 2021 Meron stampede. Those killed included 36 Israel Prison Service members, most of them new recruits, as well as three senior police officers, among them the chief of Haifa's police, and three firefighters, among them a 16-year-old volunteer. More than 17,000 people were evacuated, including several villages in the vicinity of the fire, and there was considerable property and environmental damage.

The fire appeared to be caused by human activity near the Druze town of Isfiya. On 6 December a 14-year-old resident of the town told police that he had inadvertently started the fire with a nargila coal. The teen's father argued that his son was witnessed in school at the time and could not have started the blaze.

The fire was followed by a wave of arsons throughout Israel and the West Bank. These fires, which initially created confusion regarding the source of the Carmel blaze, were all extinguished within a few hours of being lit. The motivation for the attacks was not immediately clear. Israeli police have referred to some of these fires as arson.

Government officials, including Prime Minister Benjamin Netanyahu and Foreign Minister Avigdor Lieberman, called on other countries to help assist in firefighting efforts, and the Israel Defense Forces mobilized troops for the same purpose. The fire was defeated on 5 December after raging for 77 hours, a little over three days.

== Causes ==
An animation of images from NASA's MODIS satellites showing the progress of the fire

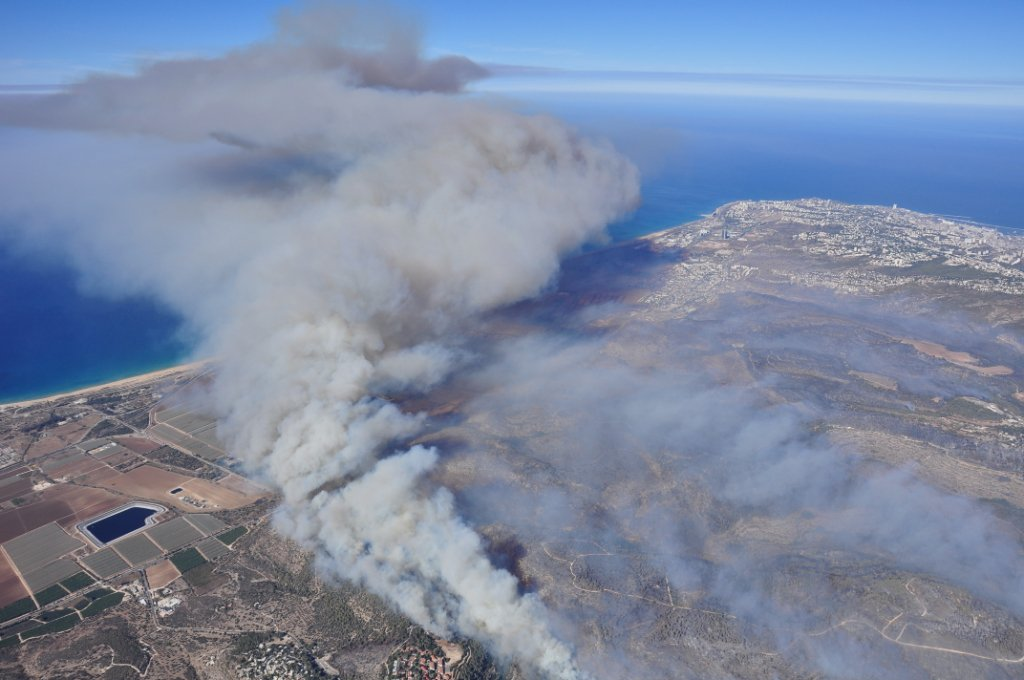
Aerial view of the smoke over Haifa

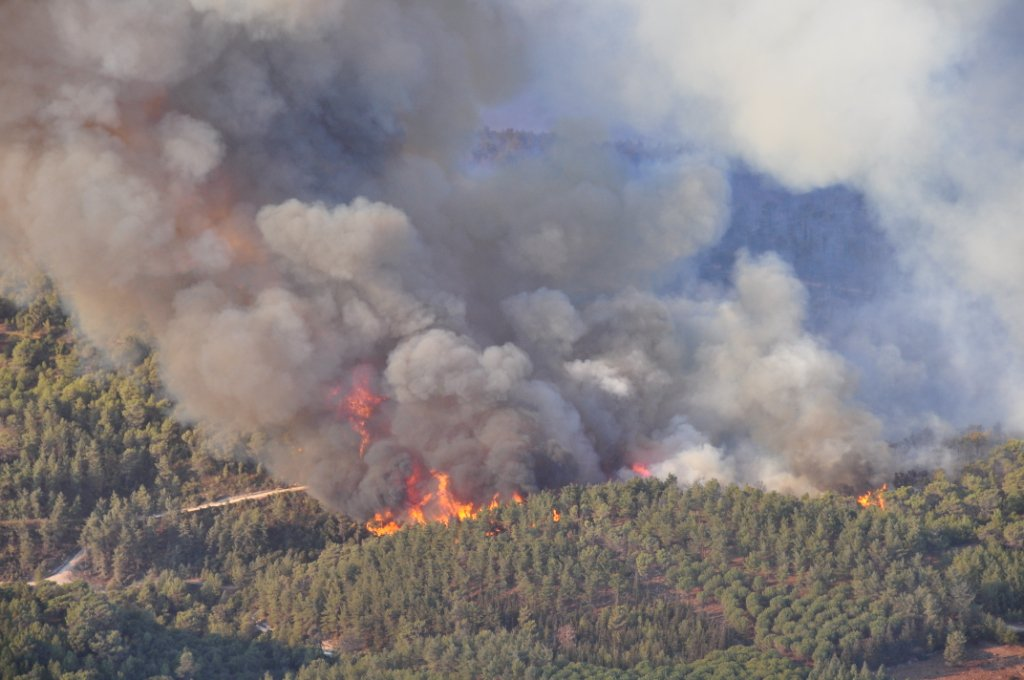
Aerial view of Mount Carmel on fire

Mount Carmel contains large areas of forests, including large numbers of Aleppo pine trees, which are more easily ignited. Over the years, many fires have occurred on Mount Carmel, among them many which devastated hundreds of thousands of acres of forest. One such as that was the 1989 Mount Carmel forest fire which destroyed about 3,200 dunams (320 ha; 790 acres) of forest.

Israel had been experiencing an unusually warm autumn and dry conditions; previous spring and summer months were also exceptionally hot. It was originally speculated that the fire was caused by the burning of an illegal garbage dump and spread due to the dry conditions and strong winds. Haifa's Mayor Yona Yahav stated that the problem was known and it was "just a matter of time until a calamity occurred".

Israel Police suggested that the fire was caused due to a bonfire that was lit by local residents and not extinguished properly and in time. However, they stressed that the investigation of the incident is in its early phases and cautioned against drawing premature conclusions. On 4 December, police arrested two adolescent brothers from the Druze town of Isfiya on suspicion of having caused the fire through negligence. Their family denied the accusation. On 5 December, the Haifa Magistrate Court extended the brothers' remand for three days, and on 6 December the court released them from custody under restrictive conditions. There were unconfirmed reports of the teens having hurled burning waste products during a picnic. The same day, police announced that they had arrested two additional youths from Isfiya the previous night, and that more arrests could be expected soon.

In the evening of 6 December, police announced that a 14-year-old resident of Isfiya admitted to inadvertently starting the fire. The teen told investigators that after smoking a nargila, he threw a lit coal into an open area and was so shocked by the result that he returned to school without telling anyone what he had done.

Druze Member of Knesset Ayoob Kara, a resident of Isfiya near where the fire broke out, had said on the evening of 2 December that he had received information that the fire was a terror act. MKs Ya'akov Katz and Michael Ben-Ari also cited the possibility that the fire was an act of terrorism and called for an investigation.

== Fatalities ==
The fire claimed 44 lives. Thirty-seven were prison service officers course cadets and their commanding officers, who were on the way to Damun Prison to evacuate its prisoners from the path of the flames. Their bus driver also perished, as did three senior police officers, two firefighters and one teenager who was a volunteer firefighter. On December 4, it was announced that all of the victims had been identified.

=== Prison service bus incident ===
36 Israel Prison Service members, of whom the majority were new recruits, died in the fire. After the fire started on December 2, the Damun Prison in the area of the fire called for reinforcements in order to evacuate prisoners. A bus carrying Israel Prison Service cadets came to assist, but caught fire on its way. Several Police officers and a number of firefighters who were behind the bus were also injured and some were killed, including Commander Ahuva Tomer, head of the Haifa police station and the first woman to hold such a major command; Tomer suffered severe burns and died in hospital on December 6. A prison service cadet who was badly burned in the incident died in hospital on December 11 and a firefighter who had been hospitalized with serious burns died on December 18.

An initial investigation showed that a tree fell down on the road, trapping the bus in a fireball. According to Internal Security Minister Yitzhak Aharonovich, after the vehicle caught fire, the driver was injured and lost control. While performing a U-turn on the narrow road the bus caught fire and the cadets tried to escape the burning vehicle. The back door would not open due to the extreme heat but was eventually broken through, enabling some cadets to flee the burning bus; however, those who fled encountered the intense blaze outside. An officer and two cadets were able to escape and were picked up by a passing motorist, who then drove through the fire to safety. Most of the IPS officers and cadets had been in their 20s and 30s, and several were Druze. The incident is the country's deadliest single peacetime event involving security forces.

== Extinguishing the fire ==
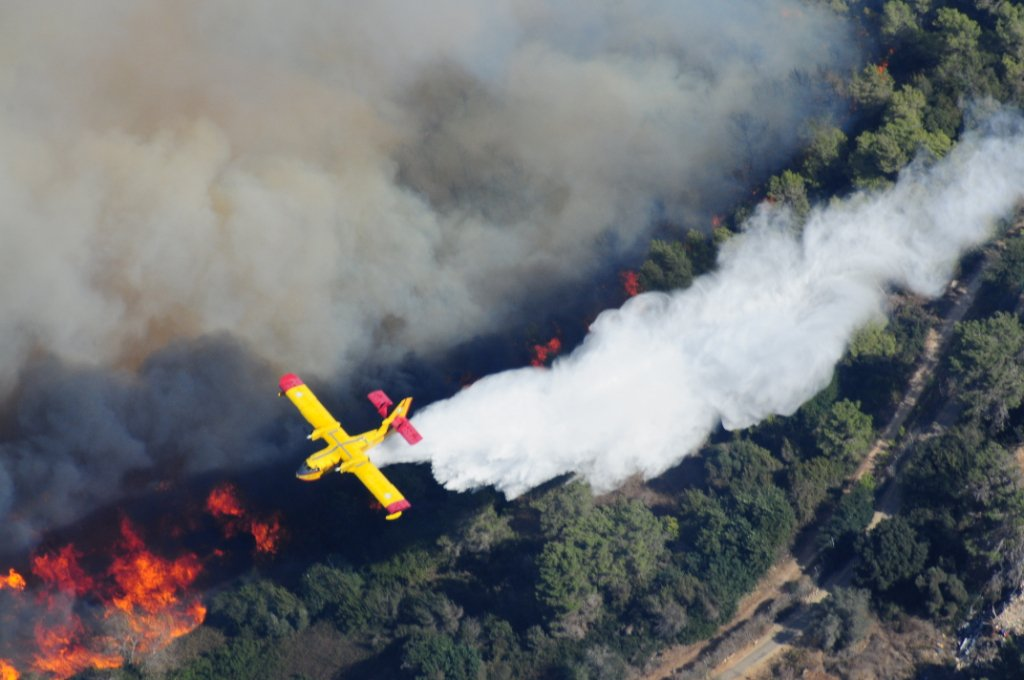
Aerial firefighting

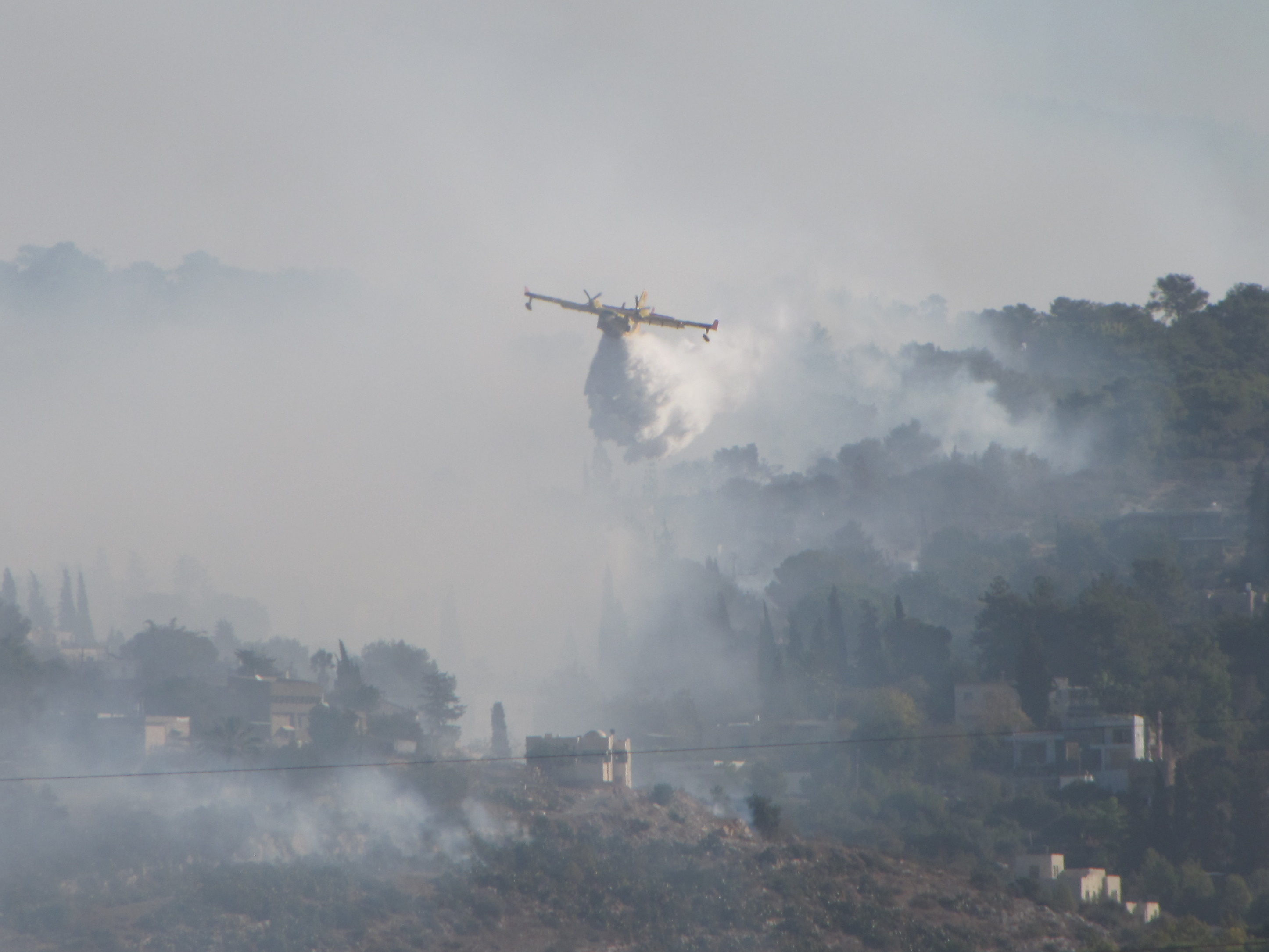
Hellenic Air Force Bombardier 415s fighting flames at Ein Hod on December 4, 2010

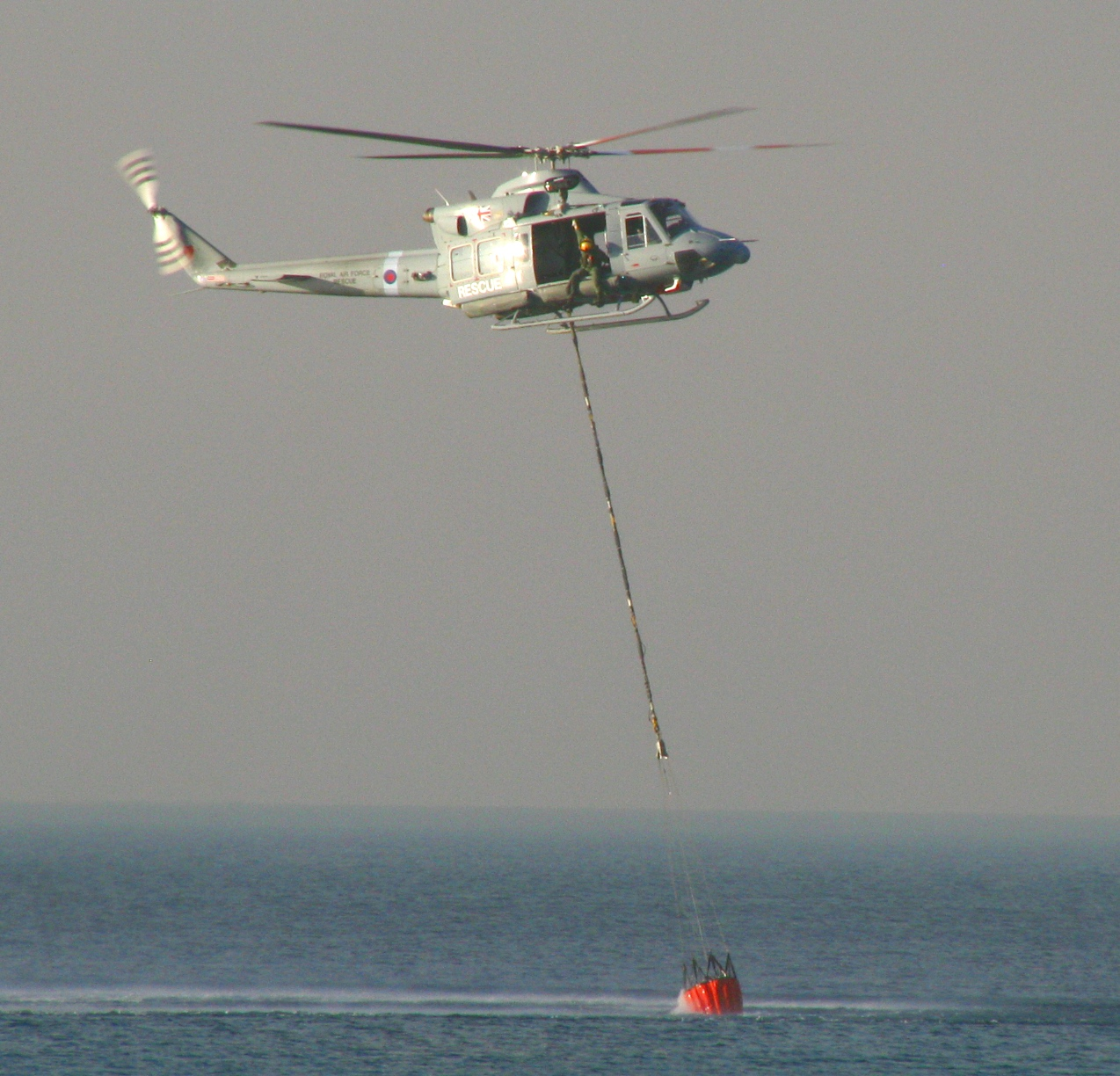
RAF 84 Squadron Bell Griffin HAR2 dips its bucket off the coast of Atlit during firefighting efforts on December 3, 2010

The Israel Fire and Rescue Services attempted to contain the blaze, and were assisted by Israeli volunteer firefighters and the Israel Police. In addition, the Israel Defense Forces (IDF) sent two battalions to assist with the extinguishing of the fire and various evacuations. It also sent heavy ground equipment from nearby military bases, including firetrucks, water tanks, cranes, D9 bulldozers and other equipment. The Israeli Air Force used an unmanned aerial vehicle for reconnaissance and intelligence collection. Use of other aircraft was prohibited because of a decade-old decision that prohibits military aircraft from being used in such a situation.

Israel requested help from various countries, including the United States. Turkey and Greece offered to send assistance to fight the fire. Greece was the first country to respond, sending 4 CL-415 aircraft supported by 1 C-130H with technicians and equipment to Ramat David Airbase. Greece also sent 1 more CL-415 and 1 C-130H with firefighters the next day. Turkey sent two firefighting aircraft, which started to extinguish fire in the early hours of December 3. The Netherlands sent four fire extinguisher-aircraft, which could do their job as early as Monday, the 6th of December, since Benjamin Netanyahu asked the Netherlands, as well as Belgium, Germany, Finland, Norway, and Russia specifically for help. The Swiss Air Force provided three Cougar Helicopter with fire fighting capabilities. Cyprus dispatched a helicopter and a plane to assist in the fire-fighting effort. Russia sent one Ilyushin Il-76 (capable of holding up to forty tons of water) and two Be-200 special firefighting planes. Countries that offered help include Azerbaijan, Bulgaria, Croatia, Cyprus, France, Jordan, Romania, Spain with four seaplanes and the United Kingdom who sent two Royal Air Force helicopters. Italy and Egypt also offered firefighting planes.

Netanyahu said he had a "warm" discussion with Palestinian Authority President Mahmoud Abbas, who offered any assistance he could to help Israel with the fire, even though the U.S. was trying to restart peace talks between the Israelis and Palestinians that broke down in September over the issue of construction West Bank settlements. The Palestinian Authority sent several fire trucks to help extinguish fires near the Israeli-Arab localities of Tayibe and Barta'a; on Sunday, December 5, 21 Palestinian firefighters joined the efforts in the Carmel Forest area itself. Senior Palestinian Authority security official Ahmed Rizek Abu Rabia said: "This is a human catastrophe. The Palestinian side is offering all the help it can through official channels."

On December 4, the Israeli government decided to hire Evergreen's Boeing 747 Supertanker to help extinguish the blaze. The plane landed at 01:00 at Ben Gurion International Airport. The plane took off and at about 11:00 it released its first cargo of water. Later in the day it made a second sortie, dropping fire retardant.

The Turkish assistance was considered surprising, due to the strain on the Turkish–Israeli relationship since the Israeli raid on a humanitarian flotilla which killed nine Turkish activists. At a Security Cabinet meeting, Netanyahu thanked Turkish Prime Minister Erdoğan (and others) for their offer to help, saying he "hopes this will be the beginning of better relations between our two countries".

== Environmental and property damage ==
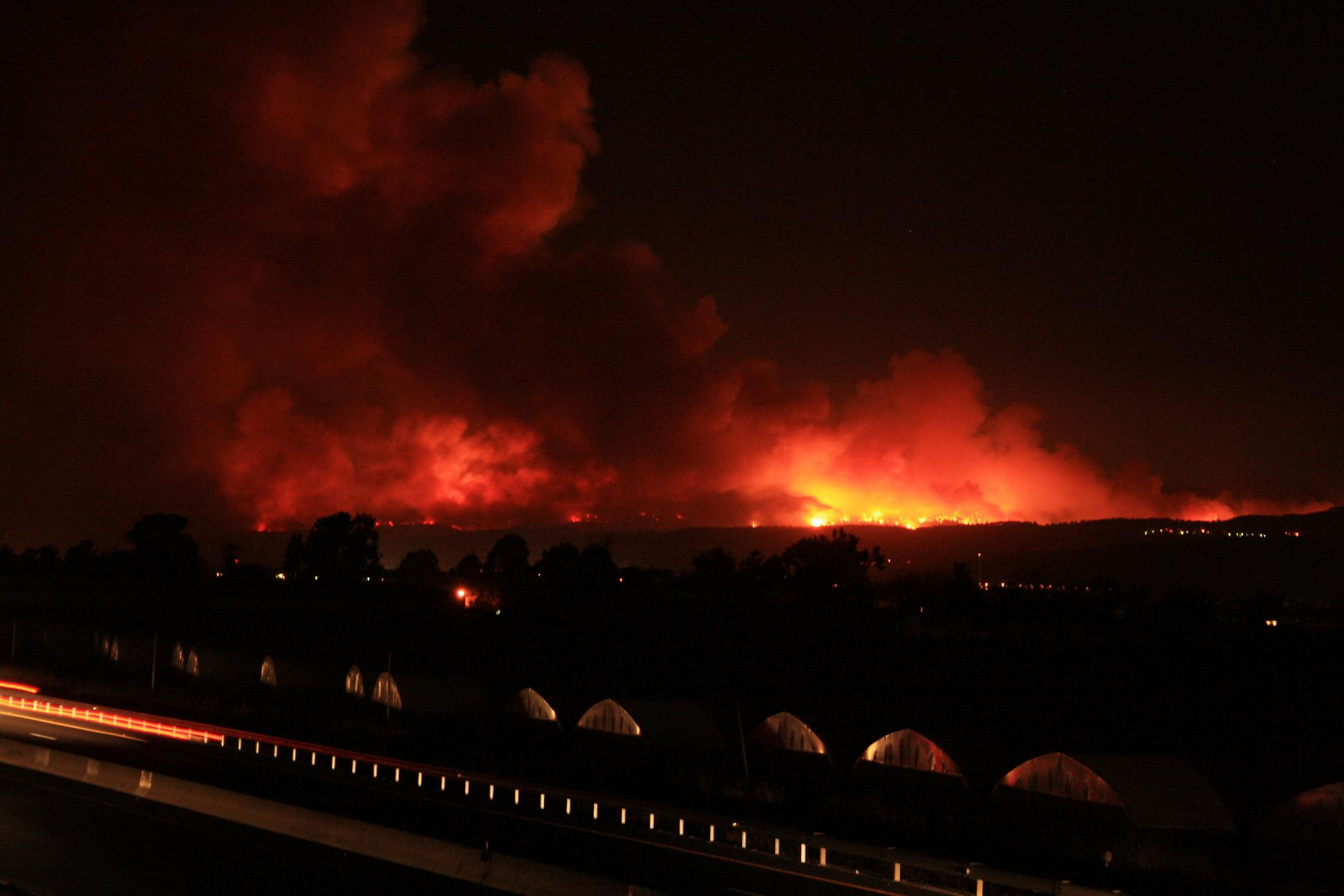
Smoke over HaBonim

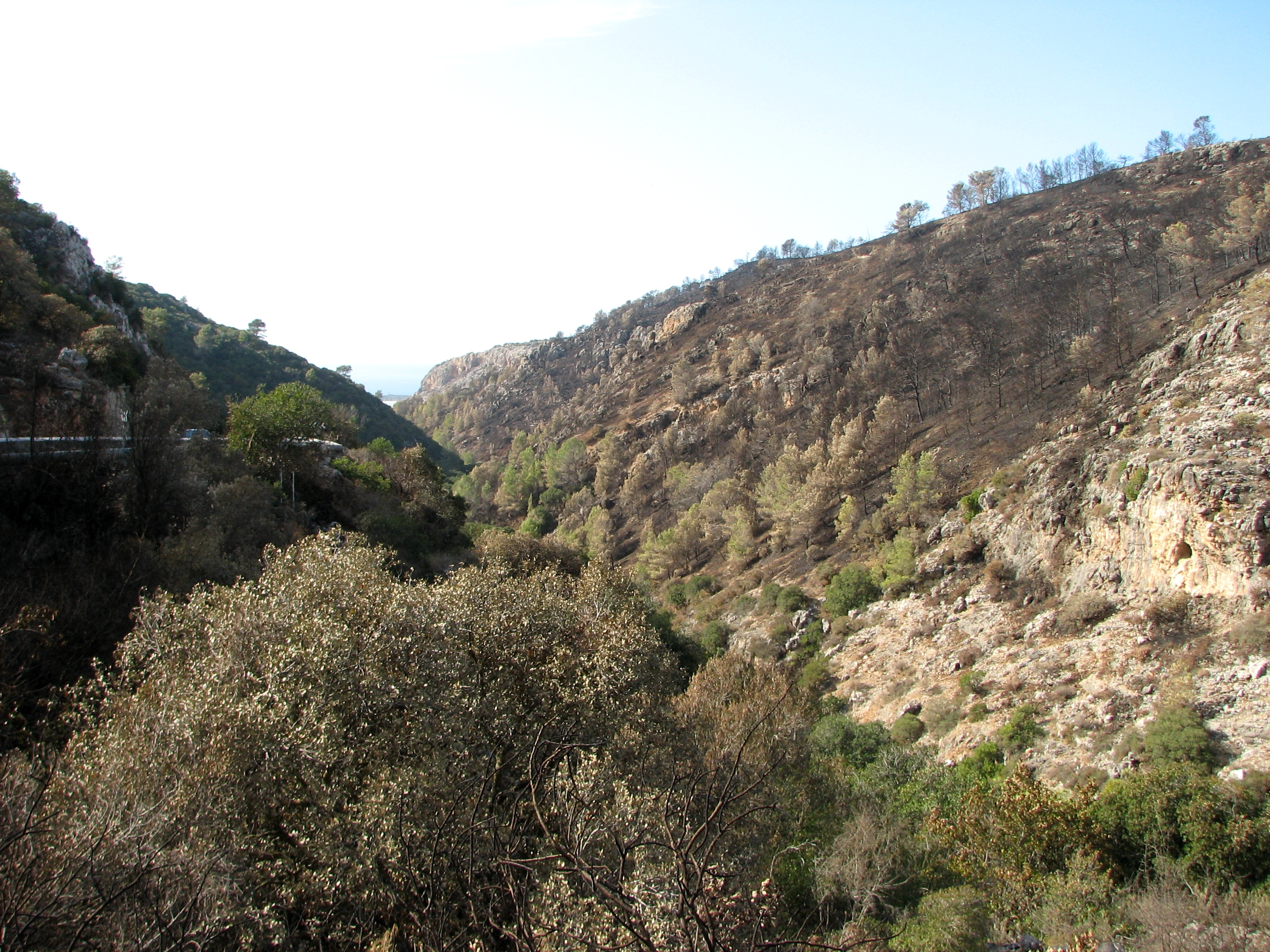
Fire damage in Nahal Oren

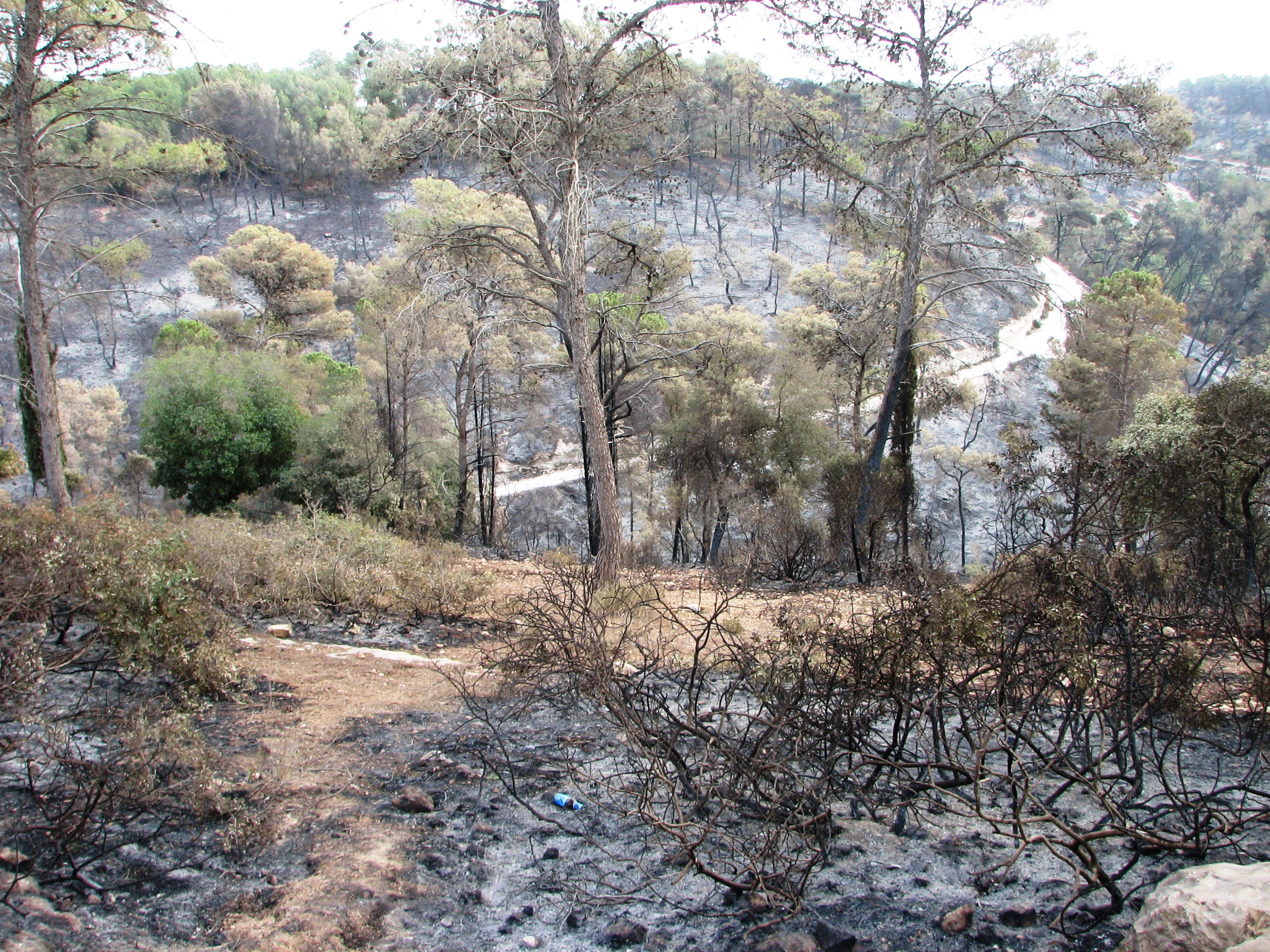
Burned forest near Isfiya

The fire caused widespread damage to property, as well as ecological damage. It initially spread very quickly because of the wind, and cut off power to houses in the vicinity. At least 40,000 dunams (4,000 ha; 9,900 acres) of forest were destroyed, and damage was caused to the Carmel Hai-Bar Nature Reserve. Omri Bone, the Northern Region Director of the Jewish National Fund, estimated that 1.5 million trees burnt in the fire. However, another 4 million trees have reportedly burned since then. According to officials, nearly half of the 150,000 dunams (15,000 ha; 37,000 acres) of the Carmel Forest reserve have been destroyed in the fire. Officials say it could take dozens of years to rehabilitate the area.

Over 17,000 people were evacuated on December 2 as a result of the fire, including 6,500 from Tirat Carmel and 3,000 from Haifa. Villages evacuated include Kibbutz Beit Oren, Ein Hod, Nir Etzion, and the Yemin Orde Youth Village, which were severely impacted by the fire. The University of Haifa was also evacuated, as well as three prisons (Carmel, Prison Six, and Damun) and the Tirat Carmel Mental Health Center. Other institutions included the Carmel Forest Hotel and the Carmel Farm.

The casualty information center opened for the first time since the 2006 Lebanon War.

== Related arson attacks ==
In the days following the outbreak of the blaze, other fires erupted sporadically far from the main site, causing police to raise its alert level nationwide. Investigators concluded that arsonists were attempting to "hitch a ride" on the Carmel fire. Police Insp.-Gen. David Cohen stated at a press conference on 3 December that "there have been a number of arson attacks in the northern district". Police sources estimated that arsonists were attempting to distract forces dealing with the Carmel fire by producing additional emergency events.

An editorial in the Jerusalem Post called these arson cases "homegrown terrorism".

=== December 3 ===
A fire broke out in the Tzur Shalom industrial zone in Kiryat Bialik, forcing the evacuation of a nearby factory. Firefighters extinguished the blaze within several hours. Police reported finding a bicycle and a bag containing a wig near the area, increasing suspicions that arson was involved.

The same day, two men in their 30s from the Druze town of Daliyat al-Karmel were apprehended by police and were suspected of hurling Molotov cocktails in a forest on a Carmel mountain hilltop, but were released once it was established that they had no connection to the original fire, and police said that no wrongdoing was established with certainty.

A small fire that erupted in Haifa's Neve Yosef neighborhood in the afternoon was extinguished by midnight.

=== December 4 ===
A fire erupted near the northern Bedouin village of Basmat Tab'un, causing no reported injuries or damage. Police suspected arson.

A brush fire that broke out in the Jerusalem Forest at about 13:00 burned 2.5 dunams (0.25 ha; 0.62 acres) of forest and open land. Firefighters and police extinguished the blaze within several hours. After hikers nearby reported two suspects fleeing from the area where the fire started, police were treating the incident as arson and opened an investigation. At night, an Arab citizen of Israel and a Palestinian were arrested after allegedly trying to start a fire near Jerusalem. The two tried to escape by car and were apprehended after a short chase.

Various fires broke out in open areas and woodland areas in the West Bank during the day, and were extinguished by Israeli and Palestinian Authority firefighters. One of these was a fire that broke out in a woodland area near Neve Tzuf. The firefighting services said that the blazes were probably acts of arson.

Additional suspicious fires erupted in Kiryat Tiv'on, in the vicinity of Adi, at Route 70 by Bat Shelomo, at Beit Rimon Junction in the vicinity of Nazareth, and near Mashhad.

== Reactions ==
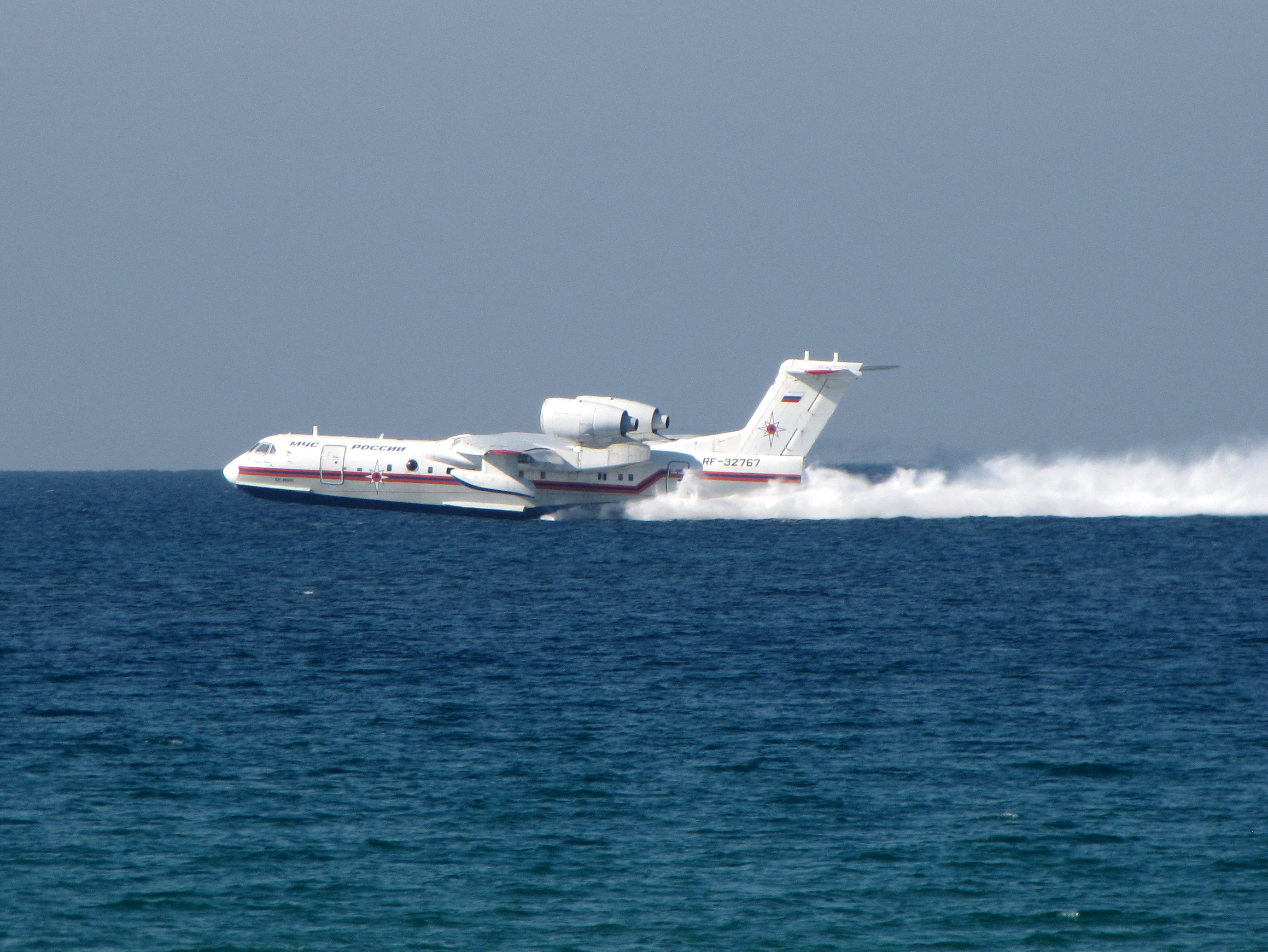
Russian Beriev Be-200 during fire fighting efforts on December 5, 2010

The Prime Minister of Israel, Benjamin Netanyahu, announced a national day of mourning, but it did not materialize. Events celebrating of Hanukkah were canceled in Haifa. The Jerusalem Post stated in an editorial that although perhaps the only positive development of the disaster had been "the tremendous outpouring of international aid, including from the Muslim world," several copy-cat fires were later carried out by Arab Israeli terrorists. A few weeks after the fire, Israeli firefighters expressed disappointment with the Israeli government for not including extra money in the state budget for the next two years to bolster up Israel's firefighting capabilities.

The President of the United States, Barack Obama, offered his condolences: "Our thoughts and prayers are with everybody in Israel who is affected by this tragedy and the family and loved ones of those in harm's way." Upon hearing the news of the fire, Obama told his aides to assist in the firefighting effort in any way that Israel needs.

Secretary of State for Foreign and Commonwealth Affairs of the United Kingdom, William Hague, posted a message on Twitter saying "[I offer] condolences to the families of those killed in forest fires in Israel."

Israel's neighboring countries both helped and criticized Israel over the handling of the fire. Qatar-controlled Al-Jazeera pointed out that "Israel failed to contain the fire", and that it was necessary for the state to plead for international help in order to bring the blaze under control. Various officials in European countries such as Greece, Italy and Germany reportedly also expressed their surprise at Israel's apparent helplessness. Many asked how it was possible that a country that went through several wars could have such a significant shortage of planes and firefighting materials. Officials in Jerusalem are reported to have said, "The PR damage in the world is huge; Israel is perceived as fully incompetent." Israeli-Arab journalist Khaled Abu Toameh showed in The Jerusalem Post, based on reader comments from readers on Arabic sites, that not all Arabs supported helping put out the conflagration.

Hamas's informal 'Prime Minister' Ismail Haniyeh told Reuters in a video interview: "These are plagues from God. Allah is punishing [the Israelis] from a place they did not expect." Ynetnews said that a Palestinian official identified with Islamic Jihad had harshly protested the unanimous support for Israel from various Islamic countries such as Jordan, Egypt, and Turkey, condemning those Arab leaders "whose hearts fill with compassion for the Zionist disaster." However, Ynetnews quoted Palestinian official Ahmed Rizek Abu Rabia as saying, "This is a human catastrophe. The Palestinian side is offering all the help it can through official channels."

The Hezbollah-run media outlet Al-Manar said that the fire signaled Israeli vulnerability to war and mass terrorism: "The great Carmel fire has embarrassed Israel's firefighting capabilities and proved its almost complete incompetence. The enormous blaze that broke out on the Carmel proved that Israel is not prepared for war or a mass terrorist strike that would cause many casualties in the home front."

== Consequences ==
As a result of the fire, the Israel Fire and Rescue Services adopted a new doctrine for fighting forest fires. On May 12, 2011, the Israeli Air Force inaugurated 249 Squadron, a new aerial firefighting unit. At the day of its inauguration, the unit, based at Sde Dov Airport, operated seven Air Tractor AT-802 aircraft.

== State comptroller's report ==
On June 20, 2012, Israel's State Comptroller Micha Lindenstrauss released his final report about the fire. The report found a large number of operational failures that contributed to the devastating results of the fire, and attributed special responsibility to Israel's Finance minister Yuval Steinitz and interior minister Eli Yishai. Prime Minister Benjamin Netanyahu and Internal Security Minister Yitzhak Aharonovitch were also named as sharing in the responsibility for the outcome. Lindenstrauss argued for accountability but did not demand the dismissal of any government ministers.
