= Hillula of Rabbi Shimon bar Yochai =

Annual gathering at the tomb of Rabbi Shimon bar Yochai

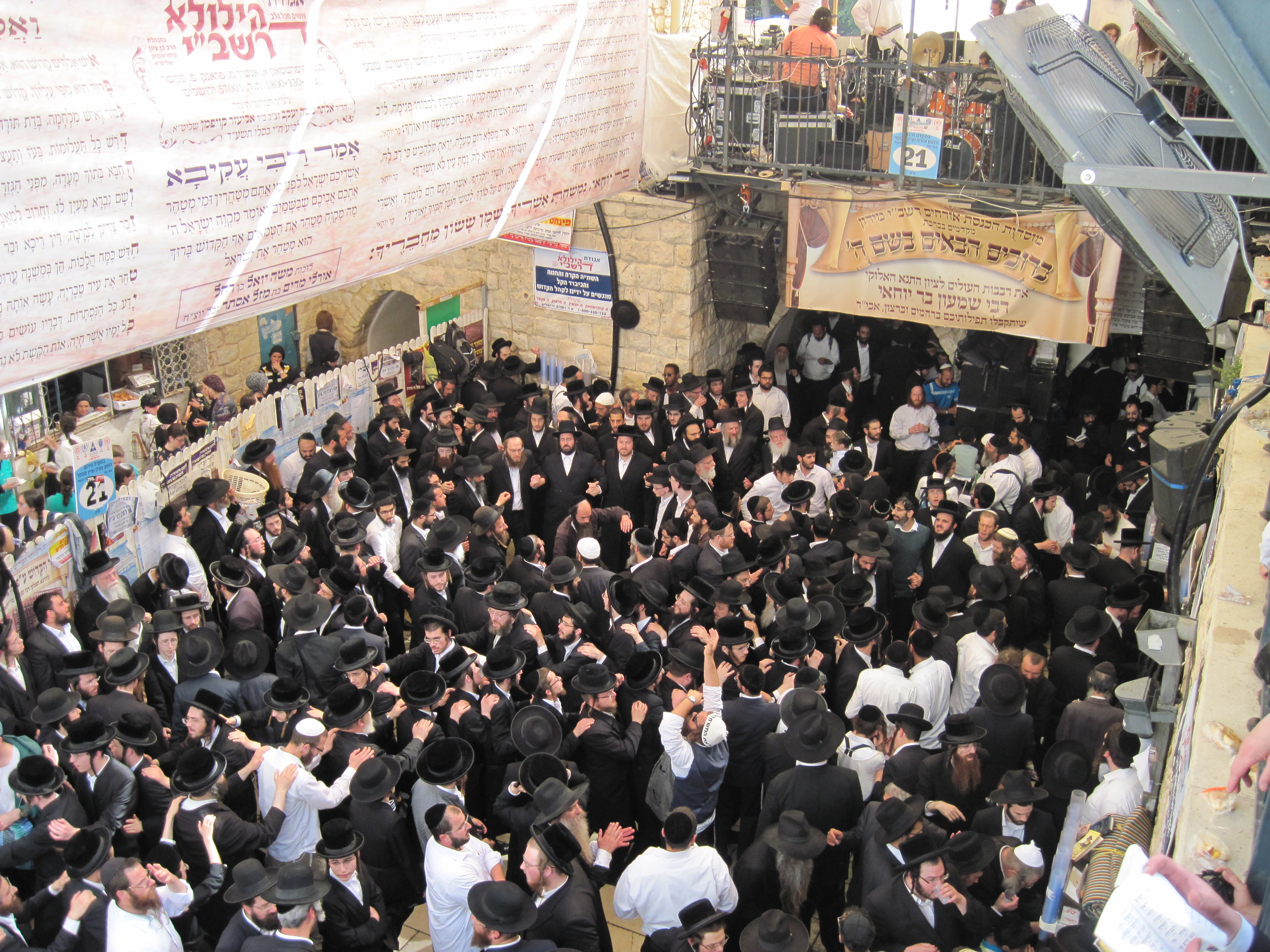
- Dancing outside the tomb, 2016
- Observed by: Jews
- Significance: Anniversary of death of Rabbi Shimon bar Yochai
- Celebrations: Lighting of a bonfire, mass dances
- Date: 18 Iyar
- 2025 date: Sunset, 15 May – nightfall, 16 May
- 2026 date: Sunset, 4 May – nightfall, 5 May
- 2027 date: Sunset, 24 May – nightfall, 25 May
- Frequency: Annual
- Related to: Lag BaOmer

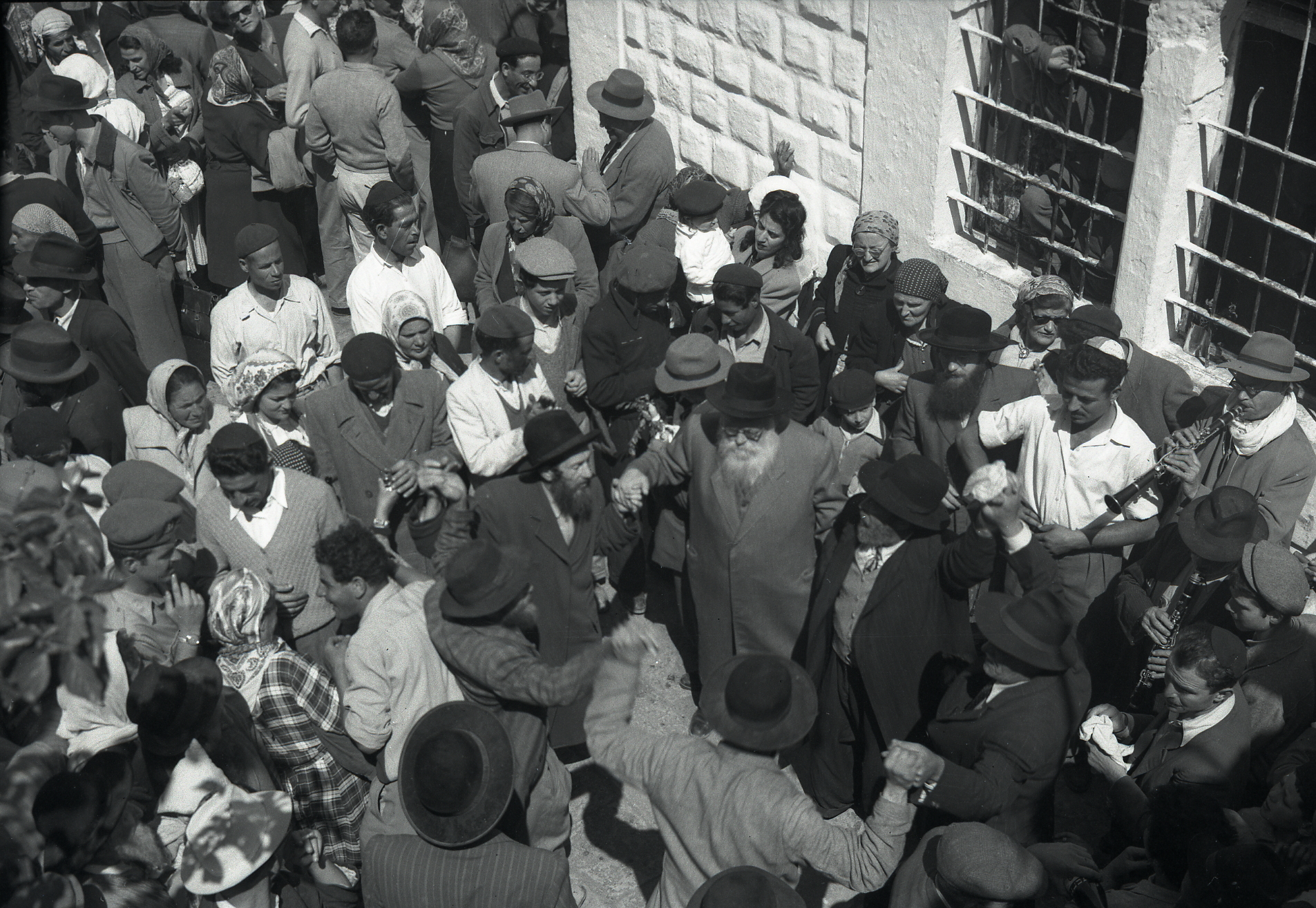
Dances in the entrance of the tomb of Rabbi Shimon, 1953. Beno Rothenberg, Meitar Collection, National Library of Israel

Every year on Lag BaOmer, some 200,000 people attend the 'Yom Hillula' (day of rejoicing) at the tomb of Rabbi Shimon bar Yochai in Meron, Israel. The highlight of the event is the traditional bonfire lit after nightfall on the roof of the tomb, after which celebration with music and dancing begins. From the 13th century onwards, the site became the most popular Jewish pilgrimage site in all of Israel, the celebration first being mentioned by an Italian traveller in 1322. Today it is the largest mass annual event in Israel.

== Origin ==
According to the Idra Zuta, one of the works printed together with the Zohar, when Shimon bar Yochai died, a divine voice called for the occasion to be celebrated as a feast.

Neither the Chazal nor the Rishonim mention that the date of his death was Lag Baomer. The source for this idea appears to be a passage by Hayyim ben Joseph Vital, which read שמחת רשב"י "the celebration of Rabbi Shimon bar Yochai" but was mistaken printed as שמת רשב"י "when Rabbi Shimon bar Yochai died" - a difference of one letter. The actual origin of kabbalistic traditions of visiting Meron on any of several dates in the month of Iyar date to the Middle Ages; but it is not clear when, by whom, or in what way Lag baOmer was first connected to Shimon bar Yochai.

== Customs ==
=== Bonfires ===
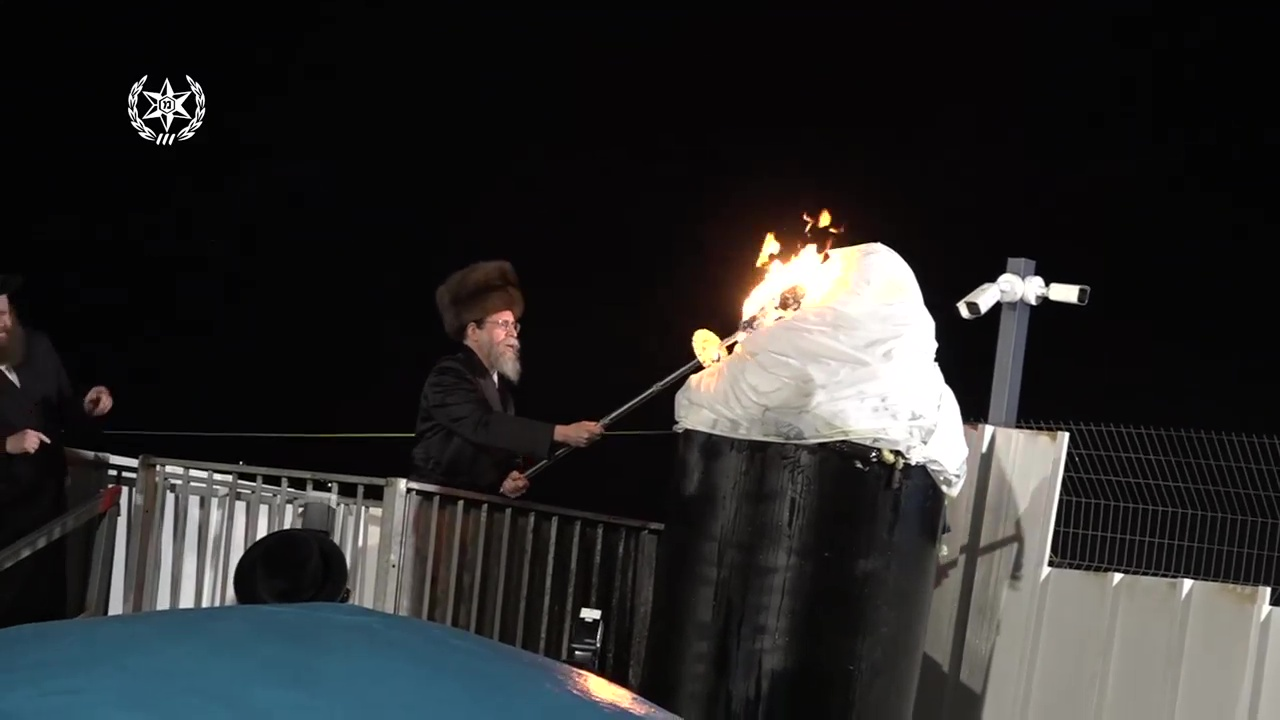
Nachum Dov Brayer lighting a bonfire during the 2021 celebration

The most well-known custom of Lag BaOmer is the lighting of bonfires. The custom symbolises the "spiritual light" brought in to the world by Rabbi Shimon bar Yochai, to whom the Zohar is ascribed. At the tomb of Rabbi Shimon, the honour of lighting the main bonfire traditionally goes to the Rebbes of the Boyaner dynasty. This privilege was purchased by Rabbi Avrohom Yaakov Friedman of Sadigura from the Sephardi guardians of Meron and Safed. He bequeathed the honour to his eldest son, Rabbi Yitzchok Friedman of Boyan and his progeny. The first hadlakah (lighting) is attended by hundreds of thousands of people annually; in 2001, the crowd was estimated at 300,000. In 2018, 18 different Hassidic Rebbes took turns leading the festivities surrounded by their followers.

An account published in 1848 describes how vast numbers of Jews would arrive at the tomb to celebrate the anniversary of Rabbi Shimon's death. It relates that over the tombs of each of the three rabbis buried in the compound was a cupola and a pillar about 3 ft high which had a hollow scooped out which would hold about 80 pints of oil each. The privilege to set the oil ablaze was sold to the highest bidder, who would use a "costly shawl or richly ornamented dress" to ignite it. "The Jews remain here for 3 days and nights, praying, and reading, and feasting. The money thus obtained, which amounts to a large sum, is employed to keep the building in repair."

=== Chai rotel ===
A custom observed during the Hillula is the free distribution of drinks. According to Taamei HaMinhagim, it is a segula (propitious practice) to distribute chai rotel (Hebrew: ח״י רוטל), a liquid measure of about 54 liters. The Hebrew word chai is the numerical equivalent of 18. Rotel is a liquid measure of about 3 liters. Thus, 18 rotels equals 54 liters (about 13 gallons). It is popularly believed that if one donates or offers 18 rotels of liquid refreshment (grape juice, wine, soda or even water) to those attending the celebrations at bar Yochai's tomb on Lag BaOmer, then the giver will be granted miraculous salvation. This practice was endorsed by Obadiah of Bertinoro and Isaiah Horowitz. The Bobover Rebbe, Ben Zion Halberstam, sent a letter from Poland to his Hasidim in Israel asking them to donate chai rotel in Meron on this holy day on behalf of a couple that did not have children. Several local organizations solicit donations of chai rotel and hand out the drinks on the donor's behalf in Meron on Lag BaOmer. Nine months after Lag BaOmer, the Ohel Rashbi organization even invites couples who prayed at the tomb and had a child to come back to Meron to celebrate the births.

=== Upsherin ===
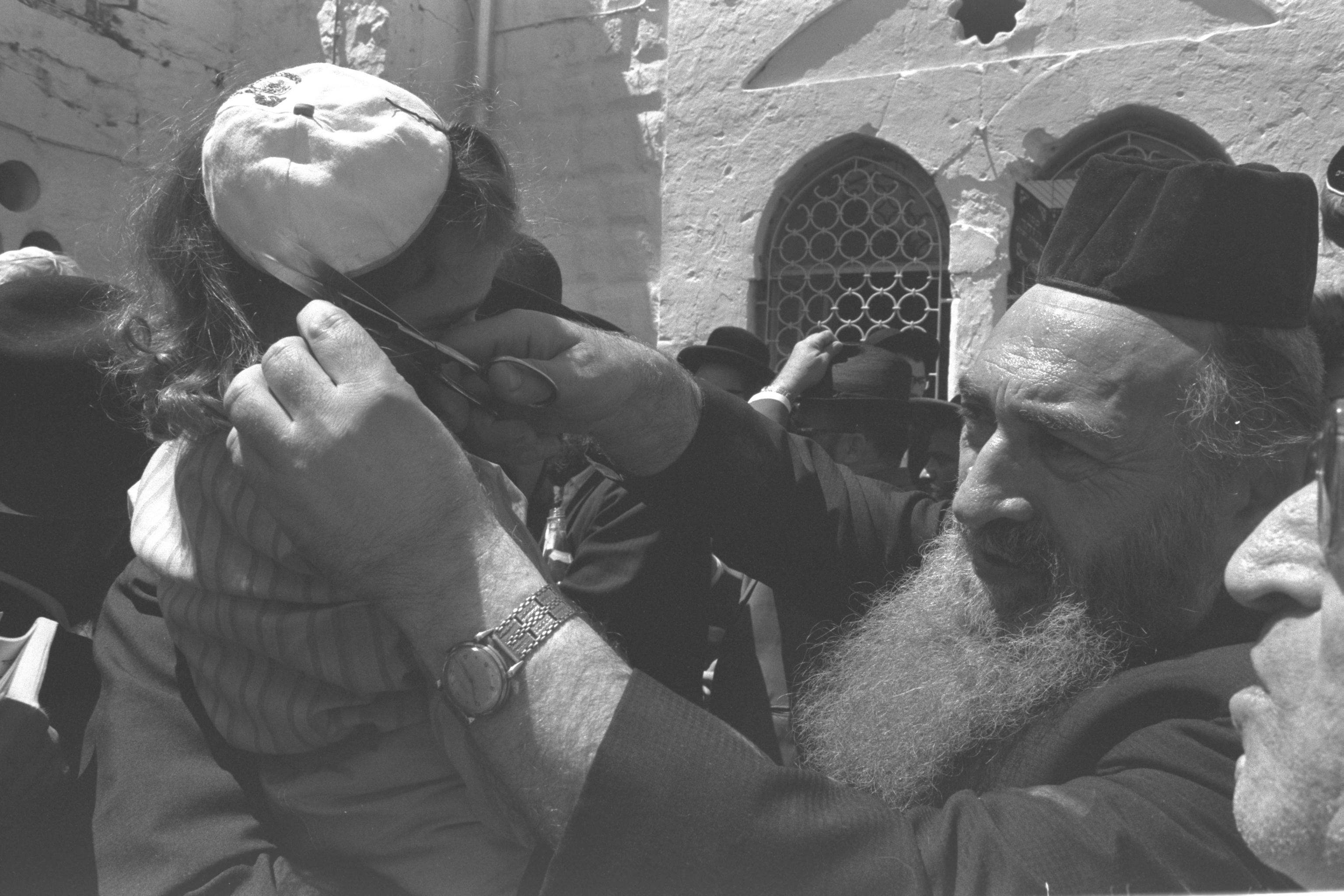
A rabbi performs the traditional first haircut on a three-year-old boy in Meron on Lag Baomer 1970.

It is customary at the Meron celebrations, dating from the time of Rabbi Isaac Luria, that three-year-old boys be given their first haircuts (upsherin), while their parents distribute wine and sweets. Similar upsherin celebrations are simultaneously held in Jerusalem at the grave of Shimon Hatzaddik for Jerusalemites who cannot travel to Meron.

=== Torah procession ===
In a tradition started in 1833, on the afternoon preceding Lag Baomer a Torah scroll belonging to the descendants of Rabbi Shmuel Abu is carried on foot from their home in Safed to the tomb.

== Attendance ==
The gathering has been described as a display of Jewish unity, with all different types of Jews attending, Ashkenazim and Sephardim, religious and secular.

In 2018, the crowd was estimated to exceed 250,000 with 5,000 police officers deployed. The event was allocated US$4m in funding by the Ministry for Religious Affairs. Organizers said they would be supplying 100,000 liters of cold water and juice and offering parve food which they claimed most pilgrims preferred, (half of the 500 litres of prepared cholent was meatless).

Various government bodies, such as the Ministry of Religions and the Israel Police, prepare for it while using resources to maintain order at the event and facilitate traffic to the site. Thousands of shuttles are used, with more than 1,000 buses bringing the celebrants from all over Israel, making it the largest annual public transportation event in Israel.

== Safety concerns ==
A 2008 report by the State Comptroller of Israel deemed the site inadequate to cater for the large number of annual visitors and a 2016 police report warned of issues with infrastructure and crowd control. An attempt by the state to take control over the site in 2011 to address health and safety concerns was met with anger by the private trusts operating the site and a court approved settlement in 2020 ruled that control would remain with the owners.

=== Incidents ===
Every year, many people are injured due to over-crowding. On 15 May 1911, a crowd of about 10,000 filled the compound. A railing of a nearby balcony collapsed with about 100 people falling from a height of roughly 7 metres (23 ft) to the ground, causing 11 deaths and injuring 40 people. On 30 April 2021, with about 100,000 people in attendance, there was a crowd crush that killed 45 men and boys, and injured over 150, in the deadliest civil disaster in the history of the State of Israel.

== Gallery ==
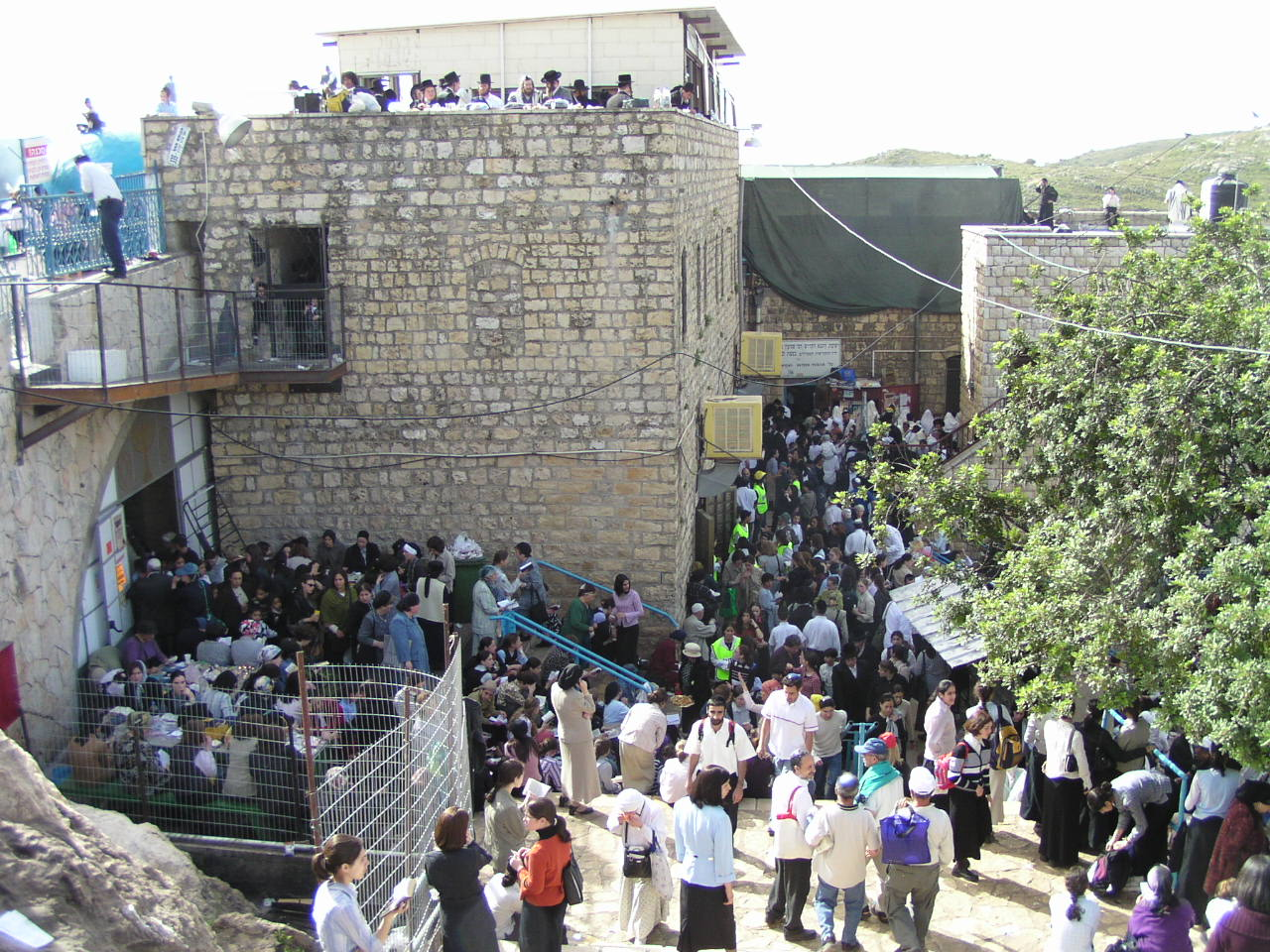
Tomb area on Lag BaOmer 2006

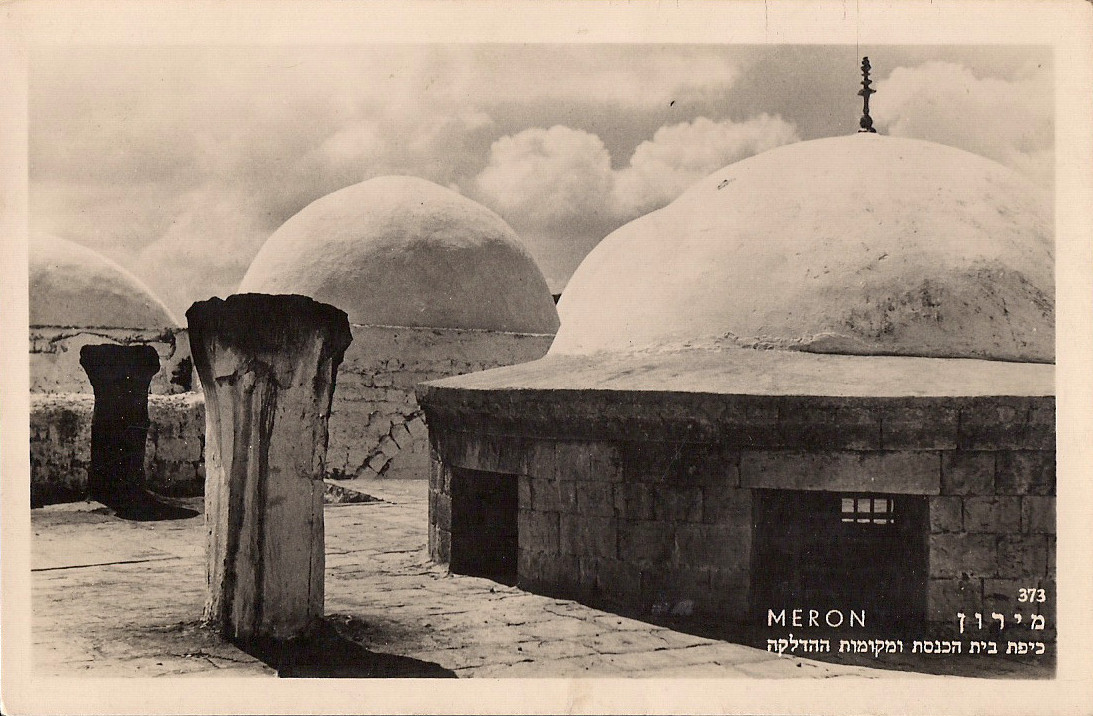
The place where the Boyan followers lit the fire, 1920

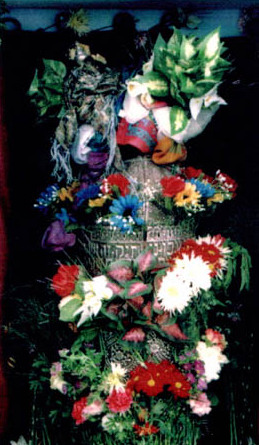
The Torah scroll of the Abu family

== See also ==
- Yom Hillula
