= Hillulah =

Hillulah may refer to:

- Yom Hillula (Hebrew: יום הילולא, day of festivity), a Jewish celebration of the life of a great tzaddik on the anniversary of his death.
- Hillulah, an EP recording released by the band Gang Gang Dance
