= Gestetner (surname) =

Gestetner is a surname. Notable people with the surname include:

- David Gestetner (1854–1939), Austrian inventor
- Shragee Gestetner (1986–2021), Canadian-American Hasidic singer
