= Shragee Gestetner =

Canadian-American Hasidic singer

Background information
- Born: 1986; Montreal, Canada
- Died: April 30, 2021 (aged 33) Tomb of Rabbi Shimon bar Yochai, Meron, Israel

Shraga Eliyahu "Shragee" Gestetner (1986 – April 30, 2021) was a Canadian-American Hasidic singer and songwriter. He released two albums and composed songs for other singers before leaving the music industry in 2014. He died in the 2021 Meron crowd crush.

== Early life ==
Shraga Eliyahu Gestetner was born in 1986 to Chaim and Shoshana Gestetner and raised in Montreal, Canada. He studied at the central Skver yeshiva in New Square, New York. Inspired by singers such as Mordechai Ben David and Avraham Fried, he taught himself to play the piano and guitar during his childhood. He composed his first song at age 12 and sold his first song at age 18. Although he refrained from singing professionally due to his parents' wishes, he recorded an album of his original songs. Producer Gershy Moskowits was impressed by his "heartfelt and beautiful" compositions and hired Gestetner to compose more songs for Hasidic singers.

== Career ==
Following his marriage in 2006, Gestetner created his debut album, Shragee, together with Gershy Moskowits and Yossi Green, and released it in 2011. The album included 11 songs composed by various artists, including Yossi Green, Pinky Weber, and Gestetner himself, and was arranged by Shua Fried, Ilya Lishinsky, and Yuval Stupel.

In October 2011, Gestetner was named Discovery of the Year by Kol Chai Radio. The following year, Tablet named him as one of the "rising talents of the current generation" of Hasidic music. He performed at weddings and fundraising dinners across the East Coast.

In 2014, he released his second album, Varemkeit (lit. 'warmth'), with songs composed by Yossi Green. That same year, with four children, Gestetner left the music industry to focus on his family and spend more time studying Torah. He then opened Vant Panels, a business providing upscale headboard panels to hotels, based on his experience soundproofing his home recording studio.

== Personal life and death ==
Gestetner married Tzippy Gestetner in 2006, after which they moved to Monsey, New York, and had five children. He was a member of the Skver Hasidic group. Gestetner died at the age of 33 during the 2021 Meron crowd crush on April 30, 2021. He had traveled to Meron with his two brothers to celebrate the holiday of Lag BaOmer. He was buried in Har HaMenuchot, and his funeral was attended by hundreds of strangers, as his immediate family, who were out of the country, could not attend. Following his death, his song "Kerachem Av" (lit. 'Like A Father's Mercy') gained popularity and became an anthem associated with the Meron crowd crush.

== Discography ==
=== Albums ===
- Shragee (2011)
- Varemkeit (2014)
