= Eleazar ben Simeon =

2nd-century Judean rabbi

Eleazar b. Shimon (or Eleazar ben Shimon or R. Eleazar son of R. Shimon; Hebrew: אלעזר ברבי שמעון, lit. Eleazar beRabbi[son of Rabbi] Shimon, or רבי אלעזר בן שמעון, lit. Rabbi Eleazar ben [son of] Shimon) was a Jewish Tanna sage of the fifth generation, contemporary of R. Judah ha-Nasi.

== Biography ==
He was the son of R. Shimon bar Yochai, and appears in many of the stories concerning his father. According to these stories, Eleazar spent his youth with his father in a cave, studying Torah while hiding from the Roman persecutors who sought his father's life. After the death of Hadrian, when events took a somewhat more favorable turn for the Jews, father and son left the cave and returned to the busy world. Eleazar, grown too zealous during his long seclusion, often cursed those who devoted their time to things secular, and his father found it necessary to interfere, appeasing them and mollifying him.

After Shimon's death Eleazar entered the academy of the Patriarch Simeon ben Gamaliel II, and became the colleague of the patriarch's son, Judah HaNasi; but there was rivalry between the two. Nevertheless, after Eleazar's death, Judah HaNasi devoted himself to caring for Eleazar's wayward son Yosei.

There are various legendary stories concerning Eleazar's unusual physical size.

Though wanted in his youth by the Roman government, later on Eleazar worked on behalf of the Roman government as a security and public order commissioner. This made him very unpopular, and one of the rabbis remonstrated with him, saying, "Vinegar product of wine [= "Degenerate son of a distinguished father"], how long will you continue to deliver the people of God to the hangman?" Eleazar, however, continued in office, justifying himself by saying, "I only weed out thistles [i.e. evil men] from the vineyard." His mentor answered that the weeding ought to be left to the proprietor of the vineyard—that is, that God Himself would visit punishment on the idlers and evildoers.

Later in life he regretted the part he had taken under the hated government, and is said to have imposed on himself the most painful penance. His wife even divorced him because the financial cost of caring for his ailments was draining her family wealth, though after this Eleazar was able to support himself due to the timely arrival of sixty sailors bearing gifts for him.

=== Death ===
Eleazar and his wife seem to have reunited by the time of his death. As Eleazar lay dying, worrying that resentment over his government work would lead the rabbis to deny him a proper burial, he enjoined his wife to preserve his remains under her roof rather than burying him immediately. According to the talmudic version of events, he died at Akbara, and his wife did as instructed. According to a secord version found in a midrash, he died in Gush Halav. Legend relates many miracles performed by the dead rabbi, one of which was that litigants plead their cases in the rabbi's house, and the verdict was pronounced from the mortuary chamber. After many years his former colleagues resolved to bury him, but a new difficulty arose. The inhabitants of Akbara (variant: Gush Halav), believing that the sage's remains miraculously protected them against incursions of wild beasts, refused permission to remove the body. Ultimately, however, in compliance with the request of the rabbis, people from the nearby town of Birya carried it off by stealth, and it was deposited at Meron beside that of his father.

Due to his varied learning, his surviving colleagues cited the Scriptural verse "Who is it that comes out of the wilderness like pillars of smoke, perfumed with myrrh and frankincense, with all powders of the merchant?" and answered, "It is Eleazar ben Simon, who united in himself all noble qualities, he having been well versed in Scripture and in traditional law, and having been a [liturgical] poet, a leader in prayers, and a preacher".

== See also ==
- Shimon bar Yochai (his father)
