= Shimon bar Yochai =

Tannaitic sage of the 2nd century

Rabbi Shimon bar Yochai
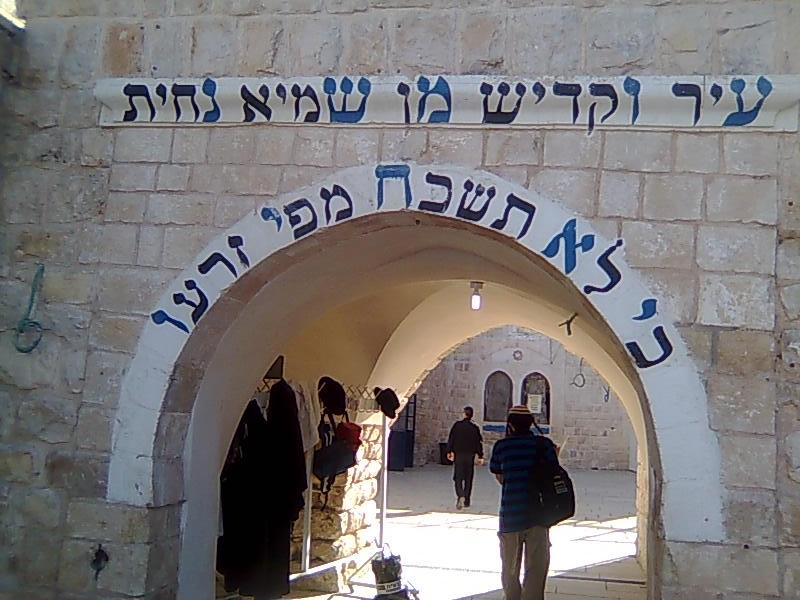
- Entrance to the tomb of Shimon bar Yochai

Personal life
- Born: 90 Galilee
- Died: 160 (aged 70)
- Buried: Kever Rashbi, Meron, Israel
- Children: Eleazar ben Simeon

Religious life
- Religion: Judaism

Jewish leader
- Yahrtzeit: Lag BaOmer (Hillula of Rabbi Shimon bar Yochai)

Shimon bar Yochai (Zoharic Aramaic: שמעון בר יוחאי, Šimʿon bar Yoḥay) or Shimon ben Yochai (Mishnaic Hebrew: שמעון בן יוחי), (Note: The 13th century Zohar and later works which adopt its stylings often use the Aramaic patronymic "bar Yochai"; however, as a Palestinian Tannaitic sage, he is always called "Shimon ben Yochai" in ancient texts.) also known by the acronym Rashbi, (Note: Rabbi Shimon bar / ben Yoḥai.) was a 2nd-century tanna or sage of the land of Israel. He was one of the most eminent disciples of Rabbi Akiva. The Zohar, a 13th-century foundational work of Kabbalah, is ascribed to him by Kabbalistic tradition, but this claim is universally rejected by modern scholars.

In addition, the essential legal works called the Sifre and Mekhilta of Rabbi Shimon ben Yochai are attributed to him (not to be confused with the Mekhilta of Rabbi Ishmael, of which much of the text is the same). In the Mishnah, where he is the fourth-most mentioned sage, he is referred to as simply "Rabbi Shimon" except in Hagigah 1:7. In baraitas, midrash, and gemara, his name occurs either as Shimon or as Shimon ben Yochai. An 8th-century pseudonymous attribution of divine revelations to Shimon by the angel Metatron is also known, called The Secrets of Rabbi Simon ben Yohai.

According to modern legend, he and his son, Eleazar ben Simeon, were noted Kabbalists. Both figures are held in unique reverence by Kabbalistic tradition. According to another modern legend, they were buried in the same tomb in Meron, Israel, which is visited by thousands year-round.

== Biography ==
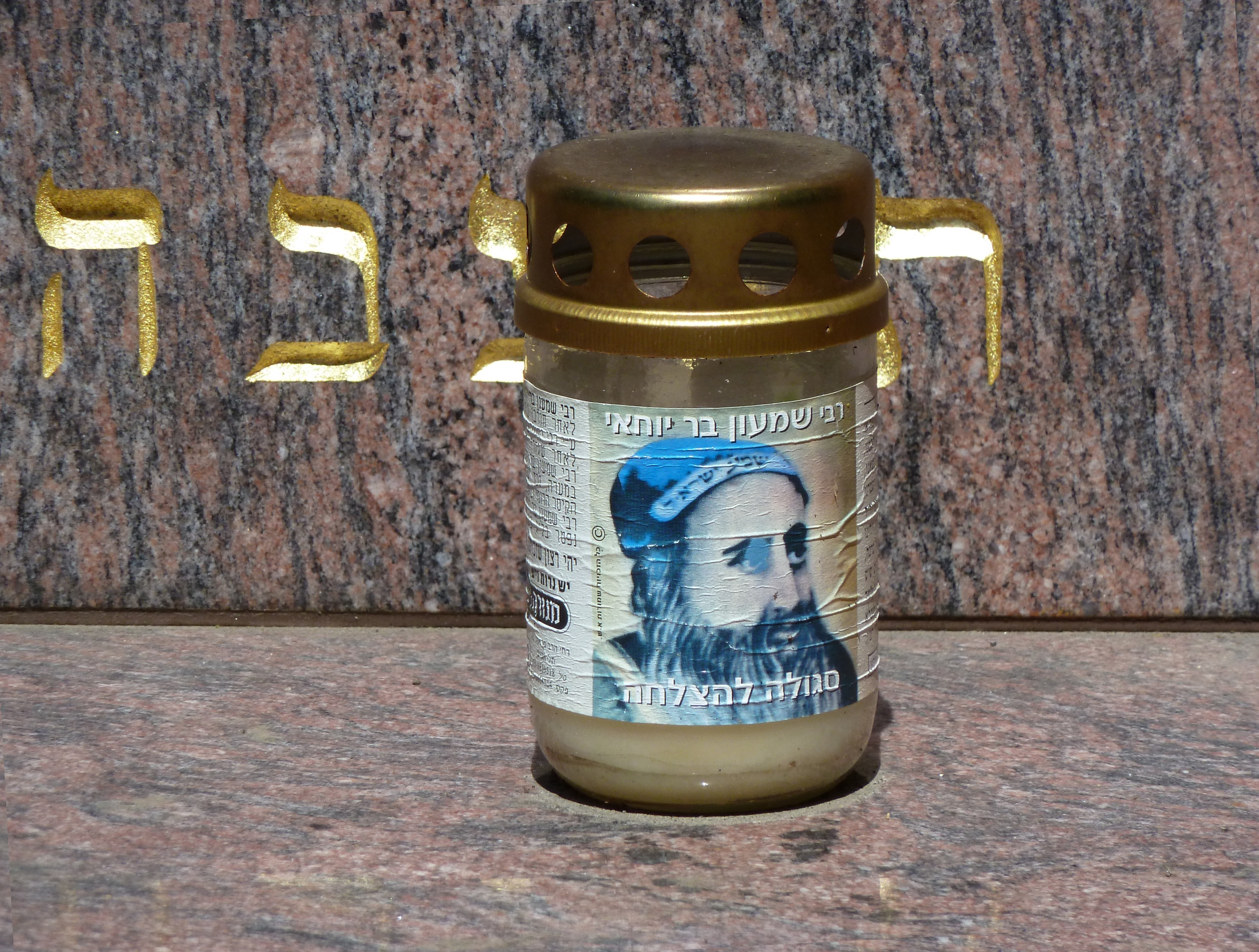
Artist's impression of Rabbi Shimon bar Yochai on a memorial candle

Shimon was born in the Galilee. He was one of the principal pupils of Rabbi Akiva, under whom he studied 13 years at Bnei Brak.

Berakhot 28a relates that Shimon had previously studied at Yavne, under Gamaliel II and Joshua ben Hananiah, and that he was the cause of the infamous quarrel that broke out between these two leaders. However, this statement is somewhat chronologically difficult, considering that about forty-five years later, when Akiva was thrown into prison, Shimon's father was still alive. Zecharias Frankel thus concluded the account in Berakhot 28a is spurious.

In the Jerusalem Talmud, in Terumot 46b and Sanhedrin 1:19a, Shimon's acuteness was tested and recognized by Akiva when he first came to him; of all his pupils Akiva ordained only Rabbi Meir and Shimon. Conscious of his merit, Shimon felt hurt at being ranked after Meir, and Akiva was compelled to soothe him with soft words.

During Akiva's lifetime, Shimon was occasionally found at Sidon, where he seems to have shown great independence in his halakhic decisions.

The following incident is recorded, illustrating his wit and piety: A man and his wife, childless despite ten years of marriage, appeared before Shimon at Sidon to secure a divorce. Observing that they loved each other and not being able to refuse a request that agreed with rabbinical law, Shimon told them that as a feast marked their wedding, they should mark their separation in the same way. The result was that both changed their minds and, owing to Shimon's prayer, God granted them a child.

Shimon often returned to Akiva, and once he conveyed a message to him from his fellow pupil Hanina ben Hakinai. Shimon's love for his great teacher was profound. When Akiva was thrown into prison by Hadrian, Shimon (probably through the influence of his father, who was in favor at the court of Rome) found a way to enter the prison. He still insisted upon Akiva's teaching him, and when the latter refused, Shimon jestingly threatened to tell his father, Yochai, who would cause Akiva to be punished more severely. After Akiva's death, Shimon was again ordained, with four other pupils of Akiva, by Judah ben Baba.

=== Legends of persecution and hiding ===
The persecution of the Jews under Hadrian inspired Shimon with a different opinion of the Romans than that held by his father. Shimon often demonstrated his anti-Roman feeling. When, at a meeting between Shimon and his former fellow pupils at Usha, probably about a year and a half after Akiva's death (c. 126), Judah bar Ilai spoke in praise of the Roman government, Shimon replied that the institutions which seemed so praiseworthy to Judah were for the benefit of the Romans only, to facilitate the carrying out of their wicked designs. Shimon's words were carried by Judah b. Gerim (one of his pupils) to the Roman governor, who sentenced Shimon to death (according to Grätz, this governor was Varus, who ruled under Antoninus Pius, and the event took place about 161). Shimon was compelled to seek refuge in a cavern, where he remained for thirteen years till the emperor, possibly Antoninus Pius, who reigned until 161, died.

Shimon, accompanied by his son Eleazar, hid in a cavern near Gadara, where they stayed for thirteen years, living on dates and carob fruit. Their whole bodies thus became covered with eruptions. One day, seeing that a bird had repeatedly escaped the net set for it by a hunter, Shimon and his son were encouraged to leave the cavern, taking the escape of the bird as an omen that God would not forsake them. When outside the cavern, they heard the voice of God say, "You are free"; they accordingly went their way. Shimon then bathed in the warm springs of Tiberias, which rid him of the disease contracted in the cavern, and he showed his gratitude to the town in the following manner:

Tiberias had been built by Herod Antipas on a site where there were many tombs, the exact locations of which had been lost. The town, therefore, had been regarded as unclean. Resolving to remove the cause of the uncleanness, Shimon planted lupines in all suspected places; wherever they did not take root, he knew that a tomb was underneath. The bodies were then exhumed and removed, and the town pronounced clean. A certain Samaritan secretly replaced one of the bodies to annoy and discredit Shimon. But Shimon learned what the Samaritan had done through the power of the Holy Spirit and said, "Let what is above go down, and what is below come up." The Samaritan was entombed, and a schoolmaster of Magdala who mocked Shimon for his declaration, was turned into a heap of bones.

To spare their garments, they sat naked in the sand, consequently covering their skin with scabs. At the end of twelve years, the prophet Elijah announced to them the death of the Roman emperor and the consequent annulment of the sentence of death against them. When they came forth, Shimon observed people occupied with agricultural pursuits to neglect the Torah and, being angered thereby, smote them with his glances. The voice of God then ordered him to return to the cavern, where he and Eleazar remained twelve months longer, at the end of which time God ordered them to come forth. When they did so, Shimon was met by his son-in-law Phinehas ben Jair who wept at seeing him in such a miserable state. However, Shimon told him that he ought to rejoice, for during the thirteen years' stay in the cavern, his knowledge of the Torah had been much increased. In gratitude for the miracle that had been wrought for him, Shimon then undertook the purification of Tiberias. He threw some lupines into the ground, whereupon the bodies came to the surface at various places, then marked as tombs. Not only was the man who mocked at Shimon's announcement of the purification of Tiberias turned into a heap of bones, but also Shimon's pupil and delator, Judah b. Gerim.

=== Later stories ===
It appears that Shimon settled afterward at Meron, the valley in front of which place was filled, with dinars at Shimon's command. On the other hand, it is said that Shimon established a flourishing school at Tekoa, among the pupils of which was Judah I. Grätz demonstrated that this Tekoa evidently was in Galilee, and hence must not be identified with the Biblical Tekoa, which was in the territory of Judah. Bacher argues that Tekoa and Meron were the same place.

As the last significant event in Shimon's life, it is said that he was sent to Rome (accompanied by Eleazar ben Jose) with a petition to the emperor for the abolition of the decree against the three Jewish observances and that his mission was successful. It is stated that Shimon was chosen for this mission because he was known as a man in whose favor miracles often were wrought. At Rome, too, Shimon's success was due to a miracle, for while on the way he was met by the demon Ben Temalion, who offered his assistance. According to agreement, the demon entered the emperor's daughter, and Shimon exorcised it when he arrived at the Roman court. The emperor then took Shimon into his treasure-house, leaving him to choose his own reward. Shimon found there the vexatious decree, which he took away and tore into pieces. This legend, the origin of which is non-Jewish, has been discussed by modern scholars. Israel Lévi thinks it is a variation of the legend of the apostle Bartholomew exorcising a demon that had taken possession of the daughter of Polymnius, the King of India. Israel Lévi's opinion was approved by Joseph Halévy. Bacher thinks there is another Christian legend which corresponds more closely to the Talmudic narrative: that in which Abercius exorcised a demon from Lucilla, the daughter of Marcus Aurelius.

Shimon is stated to have said that whatever might be the number of persons deserving to enter heaven, he and his son were certainly of that number, so that if there were only two, these were himself and his son. He is also credited with saying that, united with his son and Jotham, King of Judah, he would be able to absolve the world from judgment. Thus, on account of his exceptional piety and continual study of the Law, Shimon was considered as one of those whose merit preserves the world, and therefore during his life the rainbow was never seen, that promise of God's forbearance not being needed.

== Teachings ==
The fullest account of Shimon's teachings is to be found in W. Bacher's Agada der Tannaiten. When the Talmud attributes a teaching to Shimon without specifying which Shimon is meant, it means Shimon bar Yochai.

=== Halacha ===
Shimon's halakhot are very numerous; they appear in every tractate of the Talmud except Berakhot, Hallah, Ta'anit, Nedarim, Tamid, and Middot. He greatly valued the teaching of his master Akiva, and he is reported to have recommended his pupils to follow his own system of interpretation ("middot") because it was derived from that of Akiva. But this itself shows that Shimon did not follow his teacher in every point; indeed, as is shown below, he often differed from Akiva, declaring his own interpretations to be the better. He was independent in his halakhic decisions, and did not refrain from criticizing the tannaim of the preceding generations. He and Jose ben Halafta were generally of the same opinion; but sometimes Shimon sided with Meir. Like the other pupils of Akiva, who, wishing to perpetuate the latter's teaching, systematized it in the foundation of the Mishnah (Meir), Tosefta (Nehemiah), and Sifra (Judah), Shimon is credited with the authorship of the Sifre (a halakhic midrash to Numbers and Deuteronomy) and of the Mekhilta de-Rabbi Shimon (a similar midrash to Exodus).

The particular characteristic of Shimon's teaching was that whether in a halakhah or in an aggadic interpretation of a Biblical command, he endeavored to find the underlying reason for it. This often resulted in a material modification of the command in question. From many instances the following may be taken: In the prohibition against taking a widow's garment in pledge, it was Judah ben Ilai's opinion that no difference is to be made between a rich and a poor widow. But Shimon gives the reason for such a prohibition, which was that if such a pledge were taken it would be necessary to return it every evening, and going to the widow's home every morning and evening might compromise her reputation. Consequently, he declares, the prohibition applies only in the case of a poor widow, since one who is rich would not need to have the garment returned in the evening.

Shimon's name was widely identified with this halakhic principle of interpretation, and his teacher Akiva approved of it; therefore his contemporaries often applied to him when they wished to know the reason for certain halakhot. Shimon also divided the oral law into numbered groups, of which 15 are preserved in the Talmud. He especially favored the system of giving general rules, of which there are a great number. All this shows that he was systematic, and that he had the power of expressing himself clearly. He was dogmatic in his halakhic decisions, but where there was a doubt as to which of two courses should be followed, and the Rabbis adopted a compromise, he admitted the legality of either course. He differed from Akiva in that he did not think that particles like "et," "gam," and others contain in themselves indications of halakhot; but in many instances he showed that he was opposed to Ishmael's opinion that the Torah speaks as men do and that seemingly pleonastic words can never serve as the basis for deducing new laws.

=== Aggadah ===
Shimon is very prominent also in aggadah, and his utterances are numerous in both Talmuds. Many of his sayings bear on Torah study, which he believed should be the main object of man's life. Despite the stress he laid on the importance of prayer, and particularly on the reading of the "Shema'," he declared that one must not, for the sake of either, interrupt the study of the Torah. He considers the Torah one of the three good gifts which God gave to Israel and which can not be preserved without suffering. But recognizing the difficulty of occupying oneself with Torah study and of providing a livelihood at the same time, Shimon said that the Torah was given only for those who ate the manna or the priestly meals. He declared that had he been on Mount Sinai when God delivered the Torah to Israel, he would have requested two mouths for man, one to be used exclusively as a means for repeating and thus learning the Torah. But then he added, "How great also would be the evil done by delators ["moserim"] with two mouths!"

Among Shimon's many other utterances may be mentioned those with regard to repentance, and some of his ethical sayings. "So great is the power of repentance that a man who has been during his lifetime very wicked [Hebrew: רשע גמור, romanized: rasha gamur], if he repent toward the end, is considered a perfectly righteous man". He was particularly severe against haughtiness, which, he declared, is like idolatry, and against publicly shaming one's neighbor: "One should rather throw himself into a burning furnace than shame a neighbor in public". He denounced the crimes of usury, deceitful dealing, and disturbing domestic peace.

His animosity toward the Gentiles generally and toward feminine superstition is expressed in the following utterance: "The best of the heathen merits death; the best of serpents should have its head crushed; and the most pious of women is prone to sorcery." Although often quoted by antisemites, his comment was uttered after witnessing his teacher being tortured to death, bar Yochai himself becoming a fugitive after speaking out against Roman oppression. His hostility to the Romans is expressed also in his maxims; thus, alluding probably to the Parthian war which broke out in the time of Antoninus Pius, he said: "If you see a Persian horse tied to [the graves of] (Note: This phrase appears in one version; Buber says it is correct.)Israel, look for the steps (Note: The Rabbinic idiom "look for the steps of the Messiah" refers to Isaiah 52:7-8, "How pleasant upon the mountains are the steps of the Herald . . . the voice of your lookers will rise". The meaning is: expect that the Messiah has come.) of the Messiah".

=== Mysticism ===
Shimon combined with his rationalism in halakhah a mysticism in his aggadic teachings, as well as in his practice. He spoke of a magic sword, on which the Name was inscribed, being given by God to Moses on Sinai; and he ascribed all kinds of miraculous powers to Moses. After his death he appeared to the saints in their visions.

Thus his name became connected with mystic lore, and he became a chief authority for the kabbalists. There exist two apocryphal midrashim ascribed to Shimon: "The Secrets of Rabbi Simon ben Yohai" and "Tefillat R. Shim'on b. Yoḥai". Both of them bear on the Messianic time, but the second is more complete. The main point of these midrashim is that while Shimon was hidden in the cavern, he fasted forty days and prayed to God to rescue Israel from such persecutions. Then Metatron revealed to him the future, announcing the various Muslim rulers, the last one of whom would perish at the hands of the Messiah. As in similar messianic apocrypha, the chief characters are Armilus and the three Messiahs: Messiah b. Joseph (Ephraim), Messiah b. Aaron, and Messiah b. David (as evidenced in Dead Sea scrolls).

The Zohar, a 13th-century foundational work of Kabbalah, is ascribed to him by Kabbalistic tradition.

== Commemoration ==
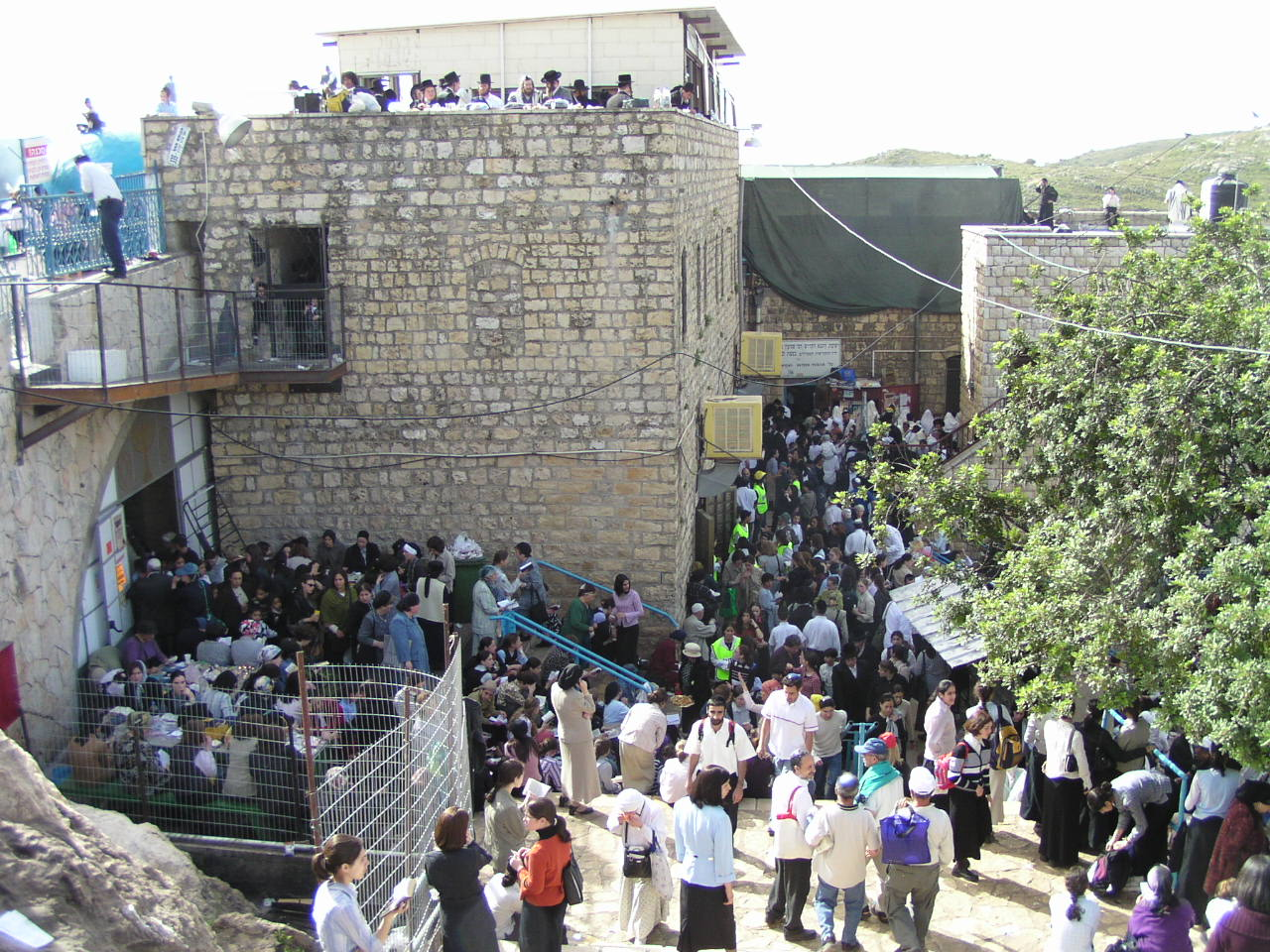
The tomb of Rabbi Shimon bar Yochai in Meron on Lag Ba'Omer

Some believe that bar Yochai died on the 33rd day of the Omer, known as Lag BaOmer, due to a printing error in Hayyim Vital's Pri Etz Chadash. Some believe that on the day of his death, he revealed deep kabbalistic secrets which formed the basis of the Zohar. According to the Bnei Yissaschar, on the day of his death, bar Yochai said, "Now it is my desire to reveal secrets... The day will not go to its place like any other, for this entire day stands within my domain..." Daylight was miraculously extended until he had completed his final teaching and died.

His yahrzeit is widely known as a Yom Hillula, a day of celebration. This is based on the original text of Shaar HaKavanot by Chaim Vital, which refers to the day as Yom Simchato ("the day of his happiness"), rather than Yom SheMet ("the day that he died"). There is thus a very widely observed custom to celebrate on Lag BaOmer at his burial place in Meron. With bonfires, torches, song and feasting, theYom Hillula is celebrated by hundreds of thousands of people. Some say that the bonfires are lit to symbolize the impact of his teachings.

=== Commemoration customs at the tomb ===
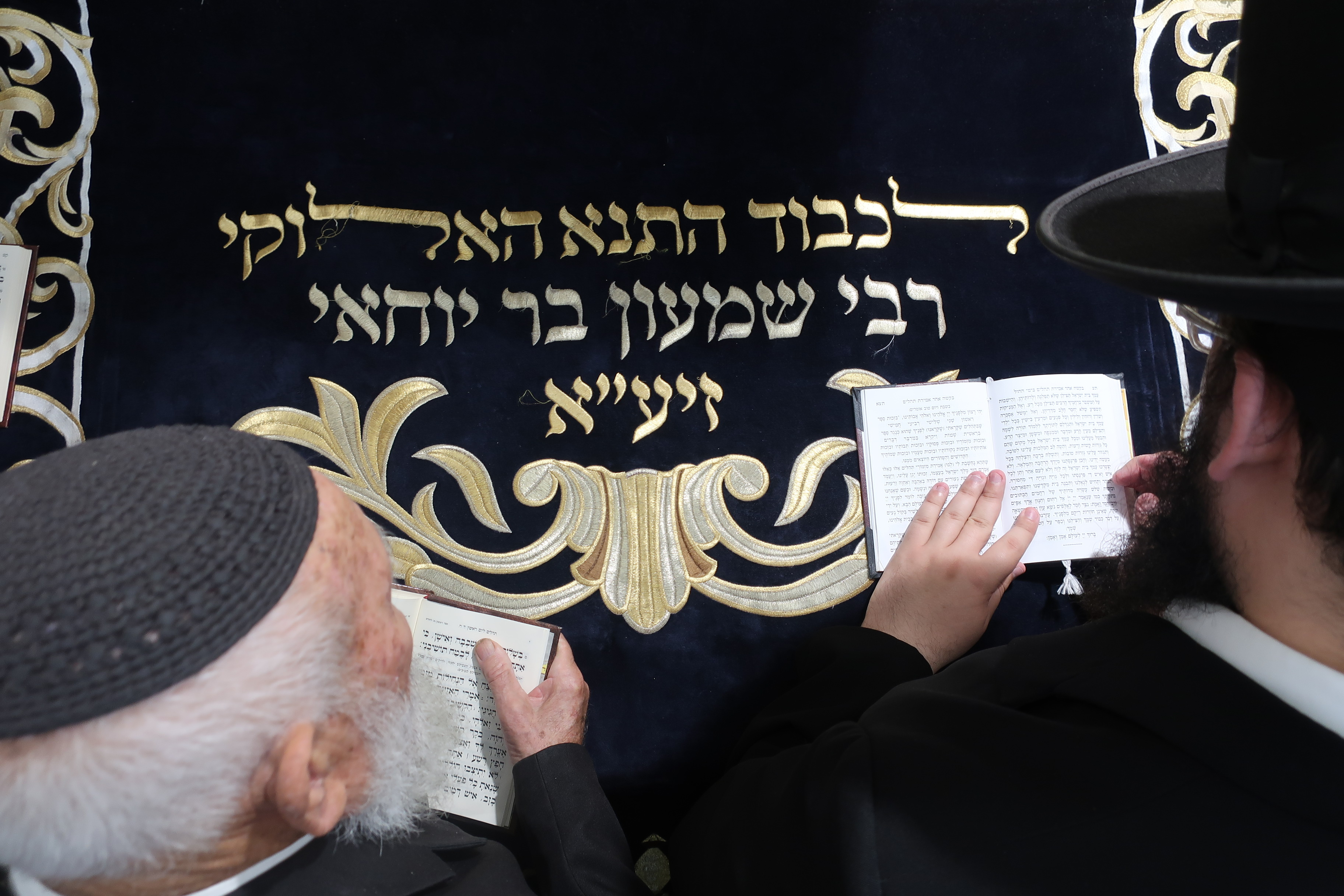
Tomb of Rabbi Shimon Bar-Yochai

Customs at the tomb include the lighting of a bonfire that traditionally goes to the Rebbes of the Boyaner dynasty Boys at the age of three will often come to the tomb to receive their first haircut. Another custom at the tomb of Shimon bar Yochai is the giving of Ḥai Rotel (Hebrew: ח״י רוטל). The Hebrew letters chet and yod are the gematria (numerical equivalent) of 18. Rotel is a liquid measure of about 3 litres. Thus, 18 rotels equals 54 litres or about 13 gallons. It is popularly believed that if one donates or offers 18 rotels of liquid refreshment (grape juice, wine, soda or even water) to those attending the celebrations at bar Yochai's tomb on Lag BaOmer, then the giver will be granted miraculous salvation.

== See also ==
- Bar Yochai, a song praising him
- Bar Yohai, a community in northern Israel named after him
- Eleazar ben Simeon (his son)
