= 2021 Meron crowd crush =

Multi-casualty crush incident in Israel at public religious event

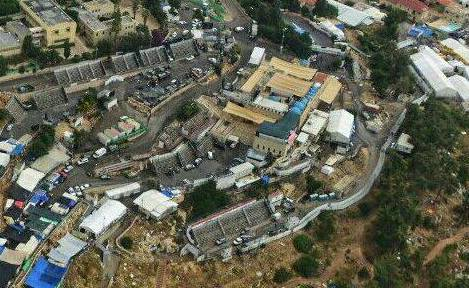
- Tomb of Rabbi Shimon bar Yochai, 2016
- Date: 30 April 2021
- Time: c. 00:50 IDT (UTC+03:00)
- Location: Tomb of Rabbi Shimon bar Yochai, Meron, Israel; 32°58′50.3″N 35°26′25.5″E
- Cause: Under investigation; includes over-crowding in Lag BaOmer celebration
- Participants: Haredi and Orthodox Jews
- Deaths: 45
- Injuries: 150
- Inquiries: Concluded

On 30 April 2021, at about 00:45 IDT (UTC+3), a deadly crowd crush occurred on Mount Meron, Israel, during the annual pilgrimage to the tomb of Rabbi Shimon bar Yochai on the Jewish holiday of Lag BaOmer, at which it was estimated that 100,000 people were in attendance. Forty-five men and boys at the event were killed, and about 150 were injured, dozens of them critically, making it the deadliest civil disaster in the history of the State of Israel. The crush occurred after celebrants poured out of one section of the mountainside compound, down a passageway with a sloping metal floor wet with spilled drinks, leading to a staircase continuing down. Witnesses say that people tripped and slipped near the top of the stairs. Those behind, unaware of the blockage ahead, continued. The people further down were trampled over, crushed, and asphyxiated by compression, calling out that they could not breathe.

The potential for such a calamity, given the tens of thousands of celebrants, had been reported by the state comptroller and the police chief. The local council had tried several times to close the site. Reuters cited Israeli media outlets in reporting that, as a precaution against the COVID-19 pandemic in the country, bonfire areas had been partitioned off, which may have created unrecognised choke-points. It was later pointed out that the bonfires were not all lit at the same time, as in the past; this allowed people who had seen one lighting to go see another, increasing crowds.

On 10 May 2021, police arrested the safety engineer who approved the Lag BaOmer celebration and his assistant. Investigators said that senior police officers should be questioned, as suspects rather than witnesses. On 27 June, Chief Justice of the Supreme Court of Israel, Esther Hayut, announced that a three-paneled state commission of inquiry would be chaired by her predecessor, former Supreme Court Chief Miriam Naor, with the other two members consisting of former Bnei Brak mayor Rabbi Mordechai Karlitz and Aluf (ret.) Shlomo Yanai. In Israel, such a commission of inquiry has the powers to subpoena witnesses and issue recommendations to the government.

== Background ==
Many traditional Lag BaOmer events took place at the festival, such as dancing and lighting bonfires, preceding the crush.

On the Lag BaOmer holiday, the tomb of the 2nd-century Tannaitic rabbi Shimon bar Yochai at Mount Meron becomes a pilgrimage site for thousands of Jews, where they pray, dance and make bonfires. Men and boys attend in sections different from those for women and girls. Haaretz called it Israel's "biggest religious festival of the year".

In 2020, the country restricted the pilgrimage due to the COVID-19 pandemic. The Cabinet of Israel permitted the 2021 pilgrimage and waived the COVID-19 cap of 1,000 attendees as part of an agreement with Ministry of Religious Services officials, which required attendees to be vaccinated against COVID-19. The event was the largest to be held in Israel since the start of the pandemic in 2020.

Additionally, for the first time in 13 years, the Mount Meron holiday took place on a Thursday and Friday, the significance being that Thursday night is seen as comparable to Saturday night in other parts of the world, with Friday being Israel's day of rest, as opposed to Sunday. Moreover, since celebrations are not permitted on Shabbat, the Jewish sabbath, which starts at sunset every Friday, the event was limited to a window of 14 hours, ending at sunset on Friday. Three bonfires were lit at the same time, each by an Admor. The organisers estimated that approximately 100,000 were at the site—others estimate 50,000—which was larger than the restricted crowd in 2020 but smaller than the hundreds of thousands of people in previous years. Israeli media reported that, as a precaution against the COVID-19 pandemic, bonfire areas had been partitioned off, which may have created unrecognised choke-points.

The crush was not the first time pilgrims at Mount Meron had been killed in a crowd crush. On 15 May 1911, eleven people were killed when a crowd of about 10,000 filled the compound and a railing of a nearby balcony collapsed. About 100 people fell from a height of roughly 25 feet (8 m) to the ground below; the deaths of seven were determined at the scene and those of four others in the days following the incident. There were 40 injured.

=== Safety warnings ===
A 2008 evaluation of the site by the State Comptroller of Israel concluded that it is not adequate for its number of annual visitors. A 2016 police report warned of issues with infrastructure and crowd control.

In 2011, the state declared it would take control over the site, but control was returned to owners in a court-approved settlement in 2020.

In 2018, a journalist reported that the "exit passageway creates a bottleneck and causes risk of people being crushed" and recommended that a larger exit way be constructed for safety after overcrowding at a funeral in Bnei Brak had led to one death and dozens injured.

A week before the 2021 festival, during the COVID-19 pandemic, government departments limited the gathering to up to 10,000 people on the site, approximately 3,000 at each bonfire. The Israel Fire and Rescue Services required that, for a crowd of 9,000 people, the site needed four different escape routes. According to The New York Times, none of the government agencies took on the task of enforcing the rules, and in the event an estimated 100,000 people attended.

In addition to the disastrous crush, the executive director at the National Coronavirus Taskforce expressed concerns about the possible spread of COVID-19 due to the huge, closely-packed crowds at the event. However, many restrictions were lifted in mid-February 2021 after most of the population had been vaccinated, and since then "things have gone amazingly well, even after events with very dense gatherings. ... we have to wait to see what happens".

== Crush ==
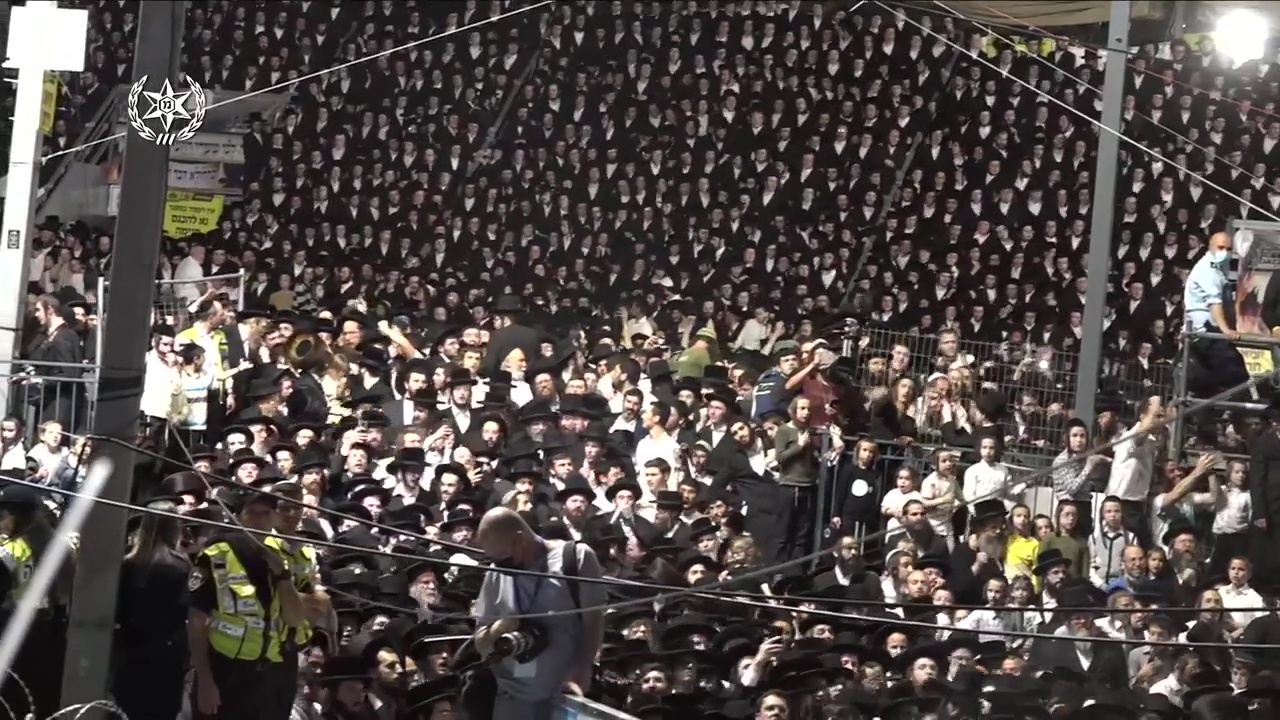
Crowd before the disaster

Four religious groups oversee different parts of the compound, with the Toldot Aharon running the part where the incident occurred. According to witness accounts, the event was held in a fenced area that was overly confining. At the time, the restricted area was filled with as many as 20,000 people. After the lighting ceremony, and as dancing began, hundreds of people left. The exit path was a narrow, steep slope with a smooth metal floor. There were no police or rescue services managing the flow into the walkway. With nothing to hold onto, the crowd leaned on each other. The path then leads to steps before a narrow tunnel. Close to 01:00, some participants began to slip and fall, either on the metal slope or the stone steps, and were trampled over and asphyxiated by those behind. As the crowd moved to the gates, a crush started. The crowd broke open side barriers of the path, creating rigged-up exits for some to break free.

According to a witness, security blocked the passageway and kept people from exiting. As people were starting to lose consciousness as the crush prevented them from breathing, police finally opened the gates to allow people through. The crush ensued as a large number of people tried to exit at the same time through the narrow passageway. Other witnesses said the path was slippery from spilled water and juice. Another witness recalled "hundreds of people screaming 'I can't breathe'".

Survivors described being buried under heaps of people and thinking that they were going to die as they could not breathe. Rescue workers spoke of "so many dead people ... on top of each other". Metal handrailings were bent and twisted by the pressure. Emergency personnel tried to perform CPR on unresponsive victims, then realised that they were spending time on the dead while others were alive, but in danger of death. The first responders themselves were traumatised by the experience; group therapy was arranged to try to ward off PTSD.

As medics tried to reach the injured, former Israeli Chief Rabbi Yisrael Meir Lau remained on stage, urging calm and reciting psalms for the injured. 300 rescue buses were prevented from entering the site due to blocked access roads. Six helicopters were flown in to evacuate the injured. Cell phone service crashed due to the number of people trying to get in contact with their families.

== Victims ==
Forty-five people were killed and approximately 150 more were injured in the crush. The dead included six Americans, two Canadians, an Argentine and a Briton, and ranged in age from 9 to 65 years old.

The Institute of Forensic Medicine at Abu Kabir completed the identification of all 45 victims by 2 May 2021.

== Investigation ==
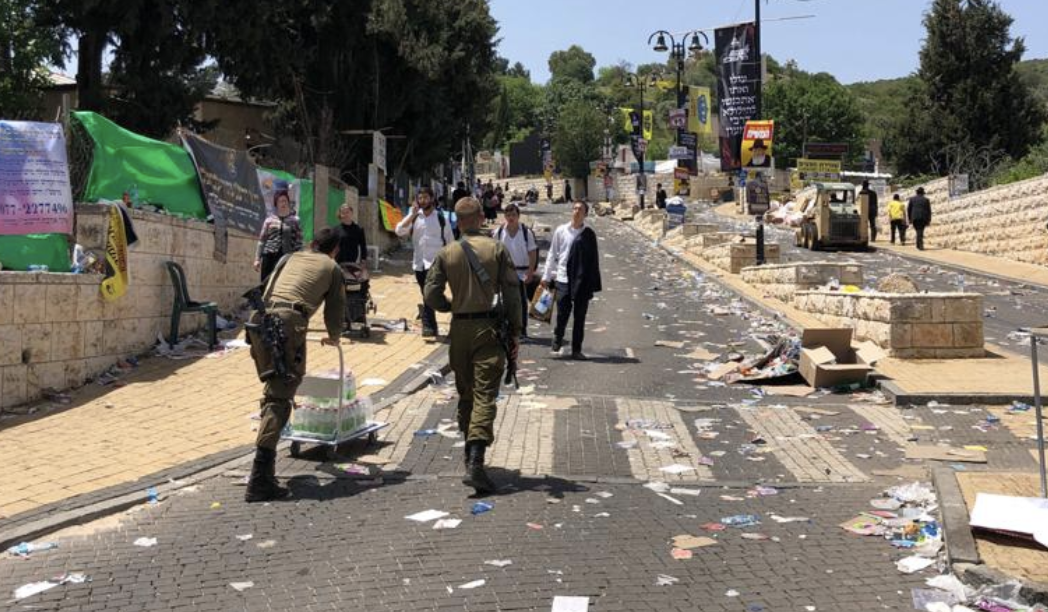
Israel Defense Forces personnel after the disaster

Following an initial investigation, the Israeli police said the crush was not preventable and that the location was being inspected for structural flaws, but the scenario of people slipping on stairs was out of police control. Police commander of the Northern district, Shimon Lavi, said however, that he "bears full responsibility". The police released a statement that the passage had been authorized by all the relevant authorities and that they had understood the event would be abnormally large. This was disputed by Mordechai Halperin, ex-mayor of moshav Meron, the local authority in which the site is located, who said that the passage, which narrowed an escape route, was constructed without any building permits and against his strenuous objections. Many commentators also suggested the Haredi community's extensive autonomy in Israel was a major contributing factor to the catastrophe.

On 3 May, State Comptroller Matanyahu Englman announced an audit of the events leading to the disaster, which would also recommend policy for future mass events. No decision was made on whether to set up a state commission of inquiry at that time. Prime Minister Benjamin Netanyahu promised a thorough state investigation, but did not specify any details.

On 10 May, the police arrested the safety engineer who had approved the Lag Ba'omer celebration and his assistant. Investigators also said that senior police officers should be questioned as suspects rather than witnesses. From the investigation at that time, it appeared that the main reason for the crowding and pressure at the Toldot Aharon bonfire compound, outside which the disaster occurred, was that police permitted the Hasidic court to hold its bonfire at a different time than the other bonfires at the compound. As a result, the crowd was not dispersed among several bonfires as was usual, but instead, additional thousands crowded in to see the Toldot Aharon bonfire. No police were stationed at the compound's exit; police only arrived 10 minutes after the crowd had pushed through the exit to the nearby walkway, causing the crush. At this stage charges of causing death by negligence were considered more appropriate than the more serious charge of causing death by taking an irresponsible risk.

== Enquiry ==
The newly elected government, which was installed on 13 June, and led by Naftali Bennett as the initial Prime Minister, committed to establishing a state commission of enquiry into the disaster.

On 27 June, the cabinet approved the appointment of a three-member commission led by former chief justice Miriam Naor to investigate the disaster. The other two members of the commission are former Bnei Brak mayor Rabbi Mordechai Karelitz and former Israel Defense Forces planning chief Major General (res.) Shlomo Yanai. Current Chief Justice Esther Hayut appointed the members.

The commission was allocated a budget of NIS 6 million (US$1.83 million) and given a broad mandate, tasked with conducting a detailed probe of the disaster and recommending specific changes to the holy site at Meron, and collaborating with the attorney general and other ongoing parallel investigations into how the disaster unfolded and the decision-making processes of government and police officials that authorized the event. These were reported to include the former public security minister Amir Ohana, former interior minister Aryeh Deri, and former housing minister Yaakov Litzman, who were in office at the time of the incident, and Israel Police Commissioner Yaakov Shabtai and Northern District Police Chief Shimon Lavi. The commission issued its interim recommendations in November 2021.

On 4 March 2024, the commission published its final report. The committee identified a culture of negligence at home contributing to the tragedy and blamed senior officials, including Prime Minister Netanyahu, for personal responsibility. Amir Ohana was also implicated due to his failure to address overcrowding risks at the event. The inquiry suggested removing Yaakov Shabtai from his position, with the final decision pending government consideration due to the ongoing war.

== Aftermath ==
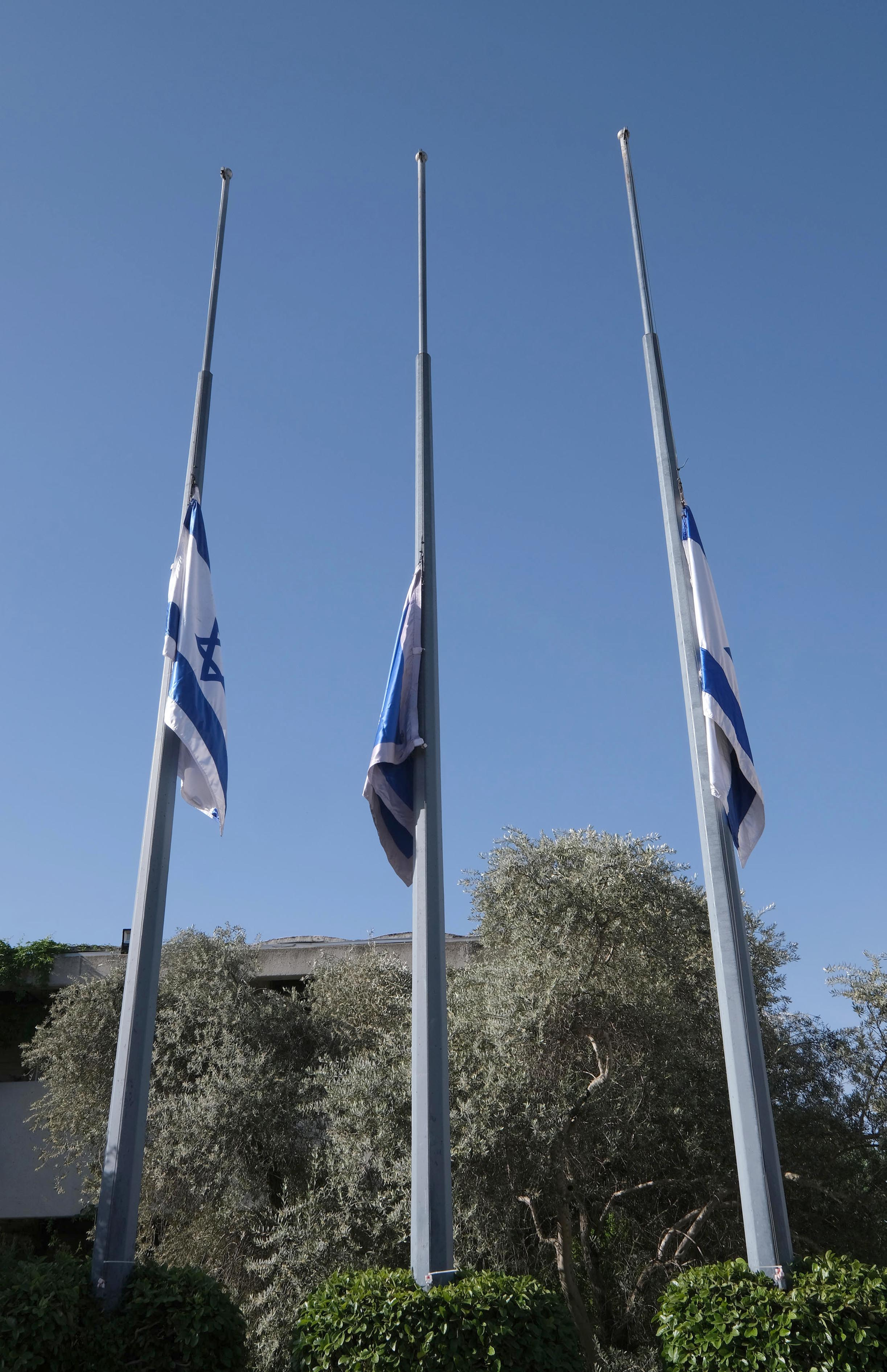
Flags lowered to half-mast on 2 May

The crush was the deadliest civilian disaster in Israel's history, surpassing the 2010 Mount Carmel forest fire, which killed 44. Netanyahu called it a "great tragedy" and said that everyone was praying for the victims. He also declared 2 May 2021 a national day of mourning. Several cultural activities were cancelled. President Reuven Rivlin offered his condolences to the victims.

Condolences were also issued by officials from many authorities, including several Arab governments (including Palestinian President Mahmoud Abbas), the European Union, the United Kingdom and the United States.

Israel's Administration of Border Crossings, Population and Immigration declared that a "fast route" to enter Israel had been defined to allow families of the injured and deceased to enter Israel.

Residents of the non-Jewish settlements of Beit Jan, Jish, Peki'in, Tamra, and Yarka arranged programs supplying aid to the survivors. Numerous Israeli Arabs offered condolences as a symbolic gesture.

On 3 May 2021, the Israeli Authority for Sacred Locations had been given a decree requiring a permit from the Israeli police commissioner to hold any celebration. Prior to the decree, only a permit from the regional police chief was required.

In September 2021, Toldot Aharon announced that their annual Simchat Beit HaShoeivah, which normally attracts thousands of visitors, would be closed to the public to avoid overcrowding. As a result of the stampede, the pilgrimage on Lag BaOmer has undergone drastic changes beginning in 2022, including a limit on visitors at once, a maximum of four hours per person, and a requirement to purchase tickets beforehand. A heavy military and police presence was also required by law.

== See also ==
- 2021 in Israel
- List of fatal crowd crushes
