= Upsherin =

Jewish ceremony

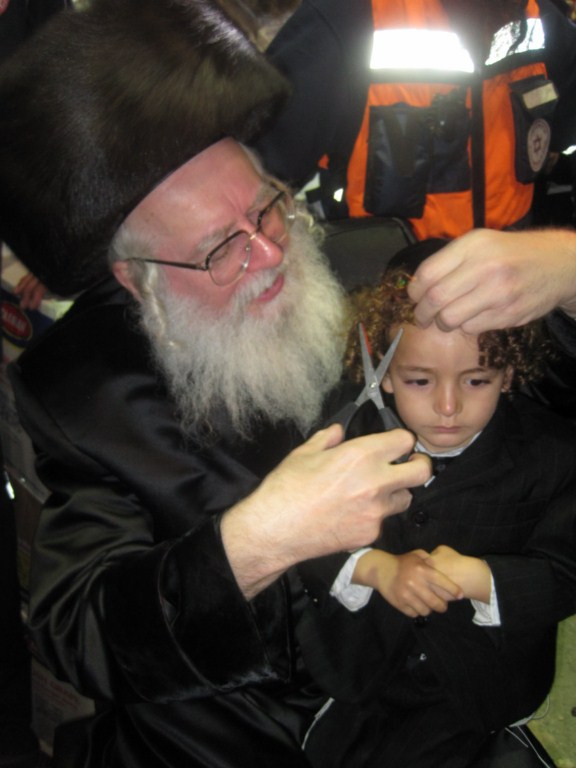
Upsherin celebration by Rabbi Eliezer Shlomo Schick

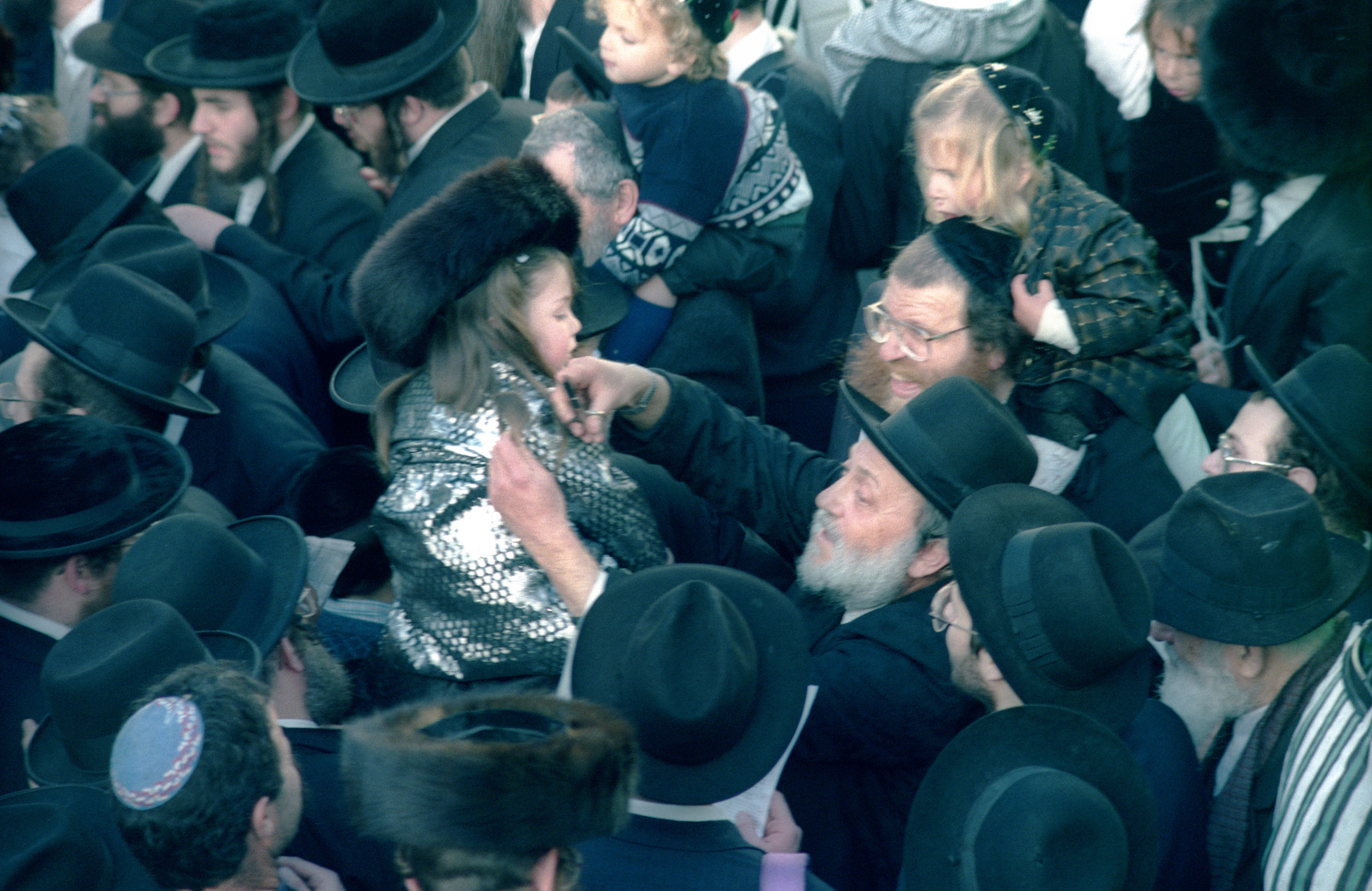
Upsherin, 1992

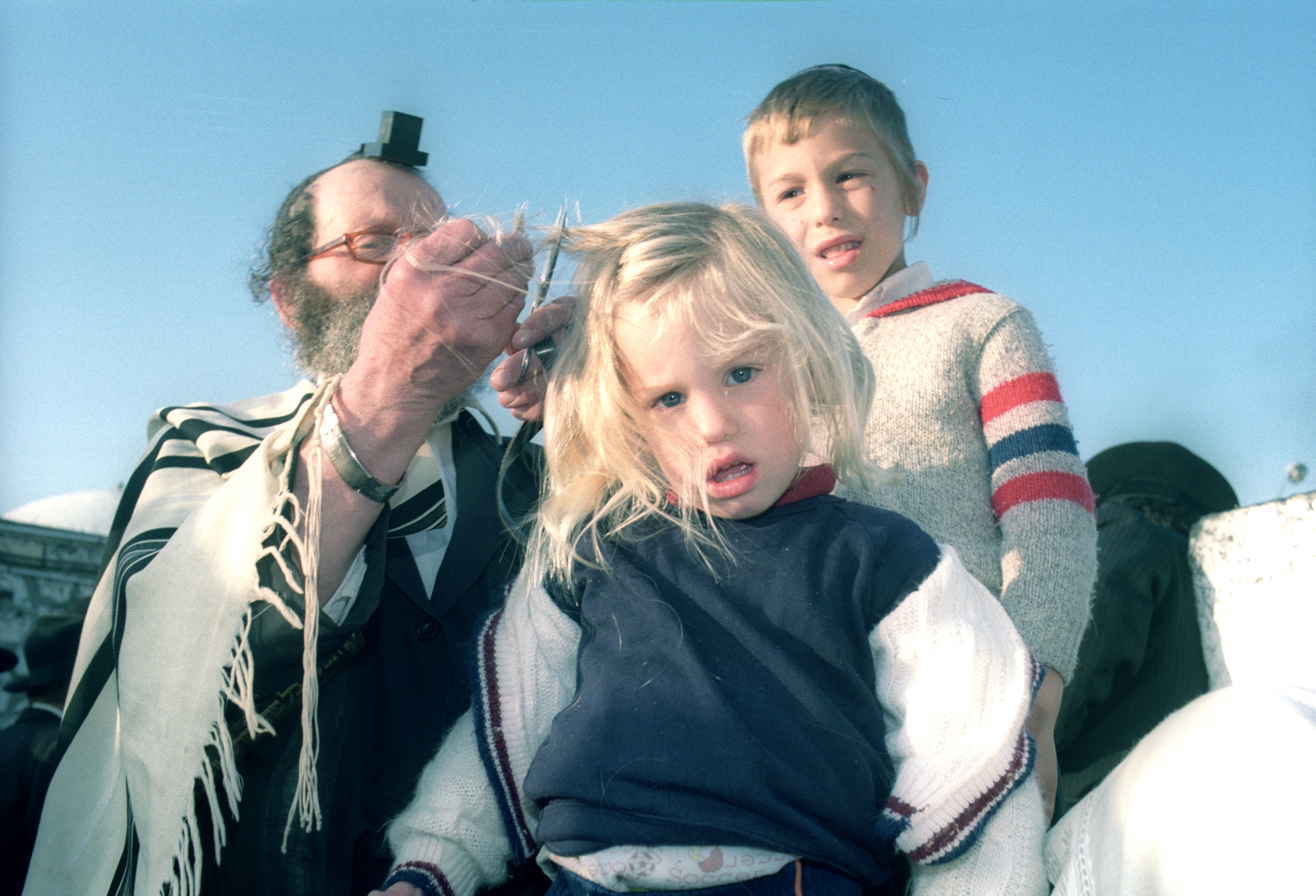
Upsherin, 1992

Upsherin, Upsheren, Opsherin or Upsherinish (Yiddish: אָפּשערן, romanized: opshern, lit. 'shear off', Judeo-Arabic: חלאקה, romanized: ḥalāqa) is a first haircut ceremony observed by a wide cross-section of Jews and is particularly popular in Haredi Judaism. It is typically held when a boy turns three years old.

== Background ==
The upsherin tradition is a relatively modern custom in Judaism and has only become a popular practice since the 17th century.

Yoram Bilu, a professor of anthropology and psychology at the Hebrew University of Jerusalem, suggests that there is little or no religious basis for the custom and its popularity is probably mainly social. The following are some quotes from his paper,

Two disparate hair-related practices appear to have converged in the haircutting ritual: the growing of ear-locks payoth – s.d.] and the shearing of the head hair. ... Ritual haircut, probably modeled on the Muslim custom of shaving male children's hair in saints' sanctuaries, was practiced by native Israeli Jews (Musta'arbim) as early as the Middle Ages. Rabbi Isaac Luria Ashkenazi, the 16th-century founder of the celebrated Lurianic School of Kabbalah who assigned special mystical value to the ear-locks, was instrumental in constituting the ritual in its present form. The ritual remained primarily a Sephardi custom following Luria, but in the last 200 years it became widespread among East European Hasidim. From Palestine it spread to the Diaspora communities, where it was usually celebrated in a more modest family setting.

Hayyim ben Joseph Vital wrote in the Gate of Repentance ("Shaarei Teshuva", O.C. 493, 8) that "Isaac Luria cut his son's hair on Lag BaOmer, according to the well-known custom." However, the age of his son is not mentioned. An obvious problem raised by Avraham Yaari, in an article in Tarbiz 22 (1951), is that many sources cite that Luria held one should not cut one's hair for the entire counting of the Omer, including Lag BaOmer

We know from travellers that by the 18th and 19th centuries, the yom hillula at Meron on Lag BaOmer with bonfires and the cutting of children's hair had by then become an affair of the masses. A well-known Talmud scholar from Bulgaria, Abraham ben Israel Rosanes, wrote that, in his visit to Palestine in 1867, he saw an Ashkenazi Jew giving his son a haircut at the hillula. Rosanes says that he could not restrain himself and went to the man and tried to dissuade him but was unsuccessful. He also complained that most of the Ashkenazi and Sephardi Jews participated in this "insanity," with "drinking and dancing and fires."

A Hasidic rebbe, Yehudah Leibush Horenstein, who emigrated in the middle of the 19th century, writes that "this haircut, called halaqe, is done by the Sephardim in Jerusalem at the tomb of Shimon bar Yochai during the summer, but during the winter they take the boy to the synagogue or Beit Midrash and perform the haircut with great celebration and parties, something unknown to the Jews in Europe."

== Customs ==
In Hasidic Judaism, the upsherin marks a boy's entry into the formal educational system and the commencement of Torah study. He will now wear yarmulke and the tzitzit and will be taught to pray and to read the Hebrew alphabet. So that the Torah should be "sweet on the tongue," the letters are covered with honey and the children lick them as they read.

Sometimes, the hair cut off in the upsherin is weighed and charity is given in that amount. If the hair is long enough, it may be donated to a charity that makes wigs for cancer patients.

Other customs include having each person attending the ceremony snip off a lock of hair and encourage the child to put a penny in a tzedakah box for each lock as it is cut. Sometimes, they sing a Hebrew song based on the Biblical verse Deuteronomy 33:4: "When Moses charged us with the Teaching / As the heritage of the congregation of Jacob."

Among some Hasidic sects, such as Gur, the upsherin is held at age two. This custom is based on the tradition that Abraham celebrated his son Isaac's second birthday, hinted at in Genesis 21:8: "The child grew up and was weaned, and Abraham held a great feast on the day that Isaac was weaned." Among some Sephardic communities, particularly in Jerusalem, the practice, known to them as ḥalāqa, is performed at age five.

=== Lag BaOmer upsherins ===
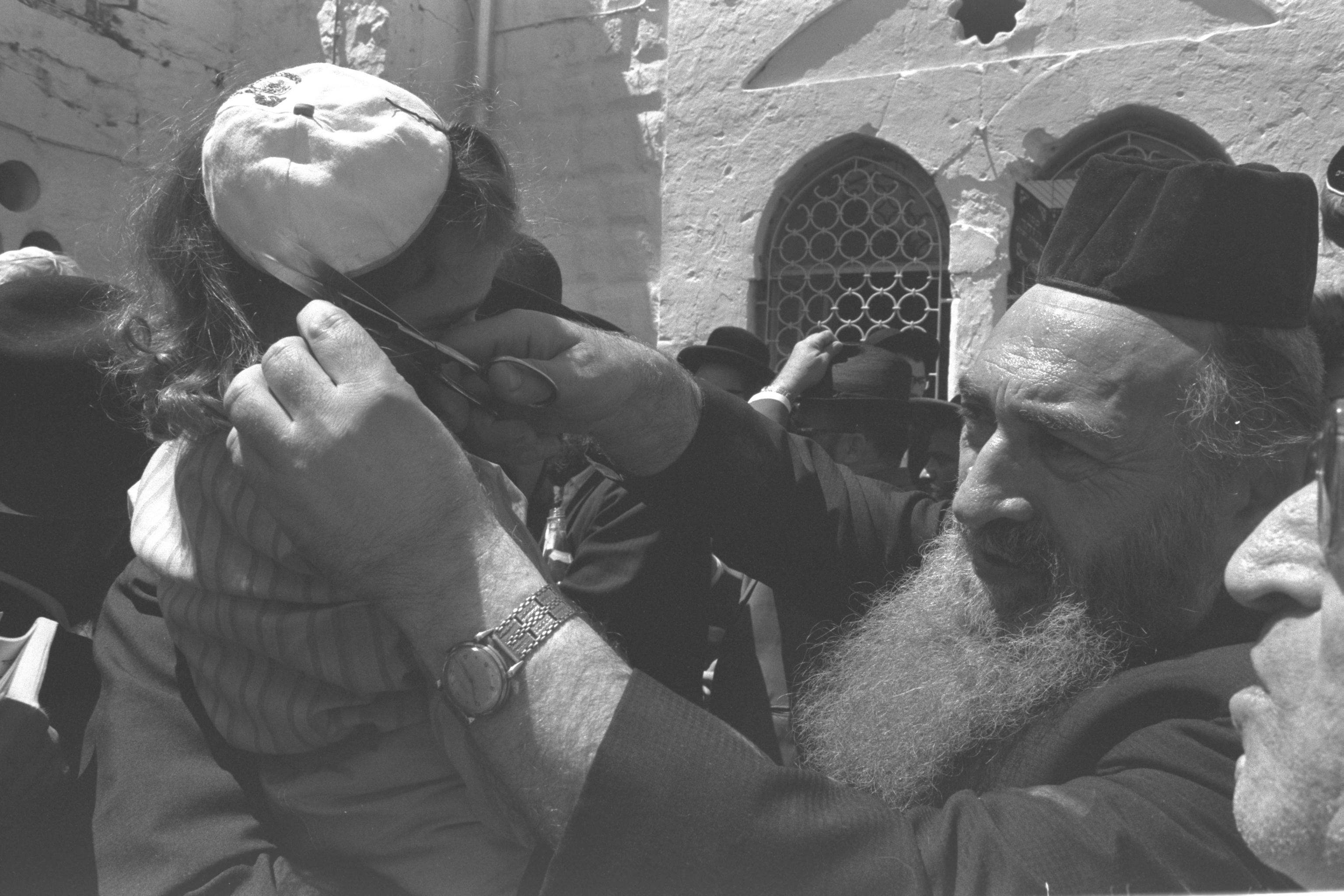
A rabbi performs the traditional first haircut on a three-year-old boy in Meron on Lag BaOmer 1970.

Cutting hair is not allowed during the time of the Counting of the Omer but is permitted on Lag BaOmer. This is why boys who turned three between Passover and Lag BaOmer celebrate upsherin on this date. It is customary that at the Lag BaOmer celebrations by the tomb of Rabbi Shimon bar Yochai in Meron, Israel, boys are given their first haircuts while their parents distribute wine and sweets. Similar upsherin celebrations are held in Jerusalem at the grave of Simeon the Just for Jerusalemites who cannot travel to Meron.

In 1983, Levi Yitzchak Horowitz, the second Bostoner Rebbe, reinstated a century-old tradition among Bostoner Hasidim to light a bonfire and conduct upsherins near the grave of Rabbi Akiva in Tiberias on Lag BaOmer night. The tradition had been abandoned due to murderous attacks on sojourners to that relatively isolated place.

== Hasidic interpretation toward Biblical allusion ==
In the Bible, human life is sometimes compared to the growth of trees. According to Leviticus 19:23, "When you enter the land and plant any tree for food, you shall regard its fruit as forbidden. Three years it shall be forbidden for you, not to be eaten." Some Jews apply this principle to cutting a child's hair, so boys are not given their first haircut until the age of three. To continue the analogy, it is hoped that the child, like a tree that grows tall and eventually produces fruit, will grow in knowledge and good deeds, and someday have a family of his own. Hasidic Rabbis have made this comparison, and in some communities, a boy before his first haircut is referred to as orlah, a term also used for a tree that cannot be harvested.

Chabad Hasidism has another explanation. "For the first three years of life, a child absorbs the surrounding sights and sounds and the parents' loving care. The child is a receiver, not yet ready to give. At the age of three, children’s education takes a leap—they are now ready to produce and share their unique gifts."

== See also ==
- First haircut
