= First haircut =

Event with a special significance in certain cultures and religions

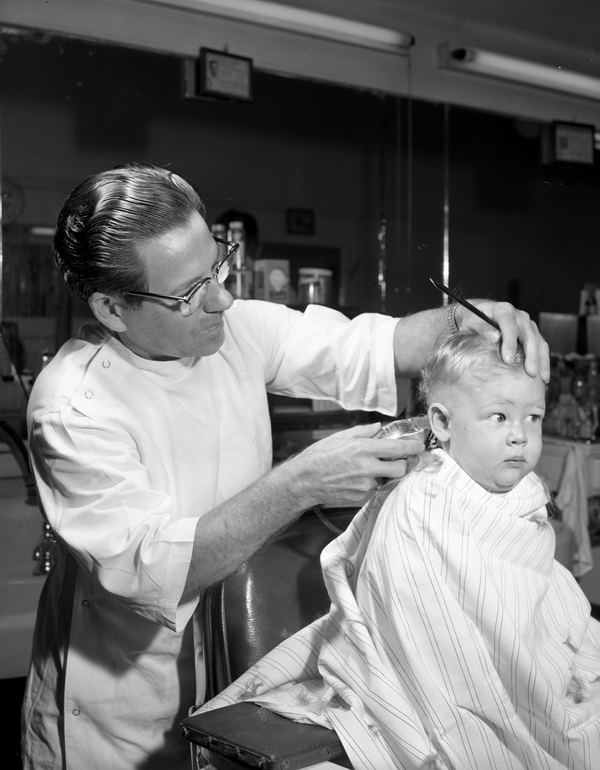
A first haircut, 1957

The first haircut for a human has special significance in certain cultures and religions. It can be considered a rite of passage or a milestone.

== Indian ==
=== Hindu ===
In Hindu tradition, from birth, hair is associated with less positive aspects of or qualities from past lives. Thus at the time of the shave, the child is freshly shaven to signify freedom from the past and moving into the future. It is also said that the shaving of the hair stimulates proper growth of the brain and nerves, and that the sikha, a tuft at the crown of the head, protects the memory.

Hindus practice a variety of rituals from birth to death. Collectively these are known as saṃskāras, meaning rites of purification, and are believed to make the body pure and fit for worship. A boy's first haircut, known as choula or mundan, is one such samskara and is considered an event of great auspiciousness. The lawbooks or smritis prescribe that a boy must have his haircut in his first or third year, though when a family does it varies in practice. A girl's first haircut typically occurs at eleven months of age.

While complete tonsure is common, some Hindus prefer to leave some hair on the head, distinguishing this rite from the inauspicious tonsure that occurs upon the death of a parent. Those that practice complete tonsure generally ritually offer the hair to their family deity. Many travel to temples such as the famed Tirumala Venkateswara Temple of Vishnu to perform this ceremony.

== Jewish culture ==
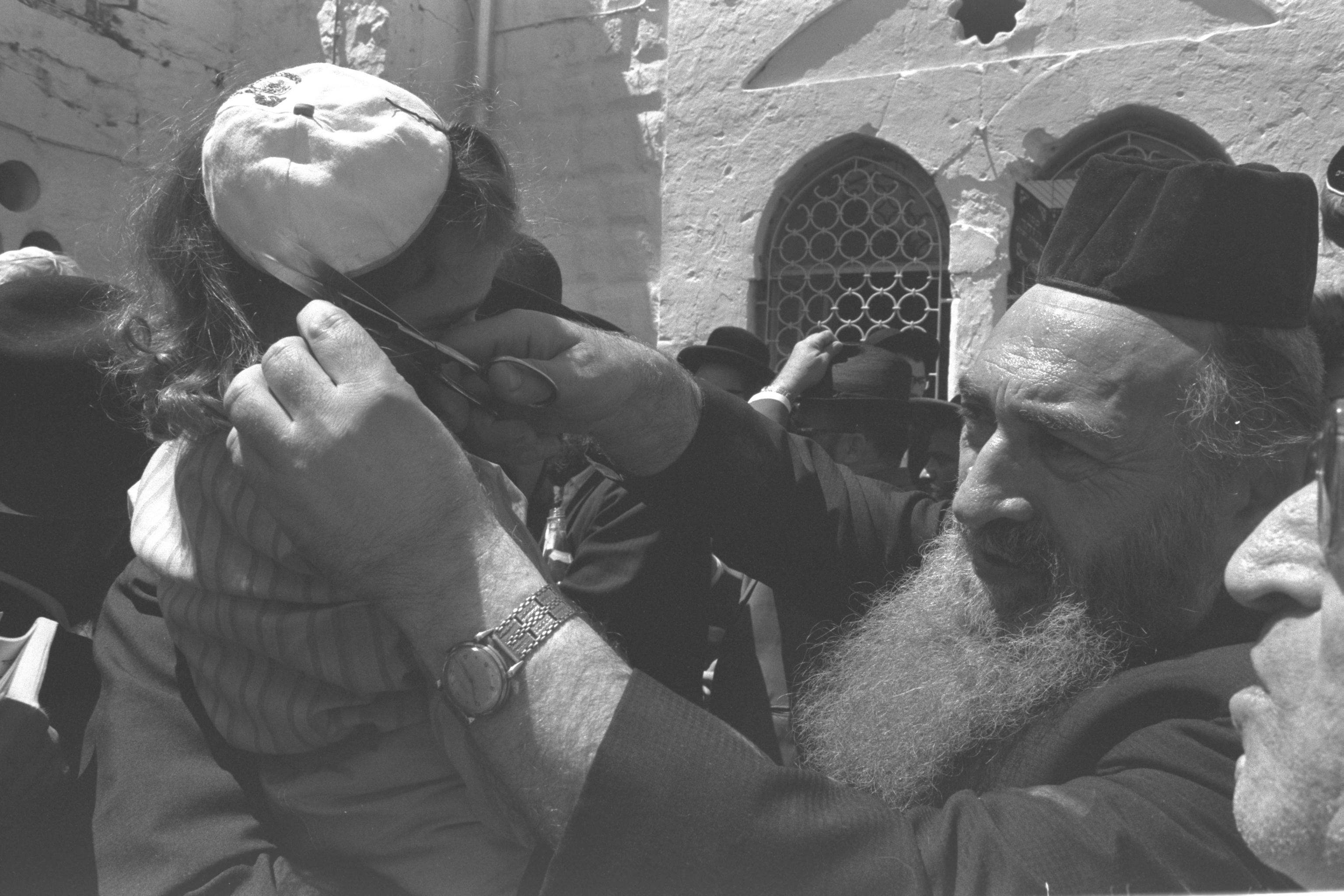
A rabbi gives a three-year-old his first haircut (Lag BaOmer, 1970)

Many Orthodox and Hasidic Jewish boys get their first haircut when they are three years old. The hair-cutting ceremony is known in Yiddish as the upsherenish or upsherin ("to shear off"). In Israel, this is sometimes referred to as ḥalaqah (from the Judeo-Arabic: חלאקה, "to shave").

== Muslim ==
The Aqiqah ceremony involves shaving the child's head seven days after birth and anointing the child's head with saffron. It is traditional to give in charity gold or silver equal in weight to the hair.

== European ==
=== Polish ===
The ritual first haircut (Polish: postrzyżyny) was a pre-Christian pagan-Slavic tradition which survived in Poland well into the 18th century. This first haircut traditionally took place between the ages of 7 and 10, and was conducted by either the boy's father or a stranger, who would thus enter into the boy's family. Before that age the boy's life was connected to his mother and he was treated as a child. The ritual haircut, coupled with the granting of an additional given name (usually the third), marked the boy's coming of age and a transition to the world of men, in which he was to be looked after by his father. The ritual also constituted the father's formal act of recognition of the boy as a son.

=== Ukrainian ===
Ukrainian babies often have their hair cut on their first birthday as part of the ancient Postryzhennya custom.

== Polynesian ==
In Cook Islands tradition, the haircutting ceremony is a rite of passage for young boys. At these large gatherings the boy sits on a chair draped with tīvaevae (quilts). As his hair is cut, members of the community plaster the boy with money or other gifts. The custom serves to maintain reciprocal ties within the extended family and community.

Traditionally, Niuean boys do not cut their hair, which is lovingly cared for by sisters, mothers and fathers. When the boys become teenagers, a ceremony is held where women tend the hair for the last time before it is cut. Members of the extended family plaster the youth with banknotes – all part of a large informal Niuean economy that links families and ensures the community looks after its own.

== Malaysian ==
Malaysian children get their first haircut after the mother's confinement period is over, this can be from around 40–44 days long but more recently it has been done in as few as 20 days. After this period is over it is common to invite extended family over for the ceremony of cutting the child's hair. This ceremony is called Cukur Jambul. The purpose of Cukur Jambul is to welcome the new baby into the clan, it also serves the secondary purpose of allowing extended family to renew their relations with each other. After Cukur Jambul has started with a reading from the Quran, the father or mother takes the child to everyone who will cut some of the baby's hair, these people usually include grandparents, members of the marhaban group, local elders, and religious leaders. It is customary for those who do the cutting to gift the baby with something small, like a little cash. The hair is often weighed in order to donate its weight in gold, or the more convenient equivalent, to the poor. It is later put into some sort of bowl and buried in front of close family members in order to finish the ceremony.

== Yazidi ==
In the Yazidi tradition, the bisk ceremony involves the cutting of a baby boy's first two or three locks by his first birthday. The locks were traditionally given to the family's sheikh and pir, and are commonly kept by the family in modern times. The bisk ceremony is regarded as the central initiatory ritual by most Yazidis from Turkey, Armenia and Syria. In the European Diaspora, the term is often translated as baptism.

== See also ==
- Tonsure, traditional practice of Christian churches of cutting or shaving the hair from the scalp (while leaving some parts uncut) of clerics, monastics, and, in the Eastern Orthodox Church, all baptized members.
