= Yom hillula =

Death anniversary in Hasidic Judaism

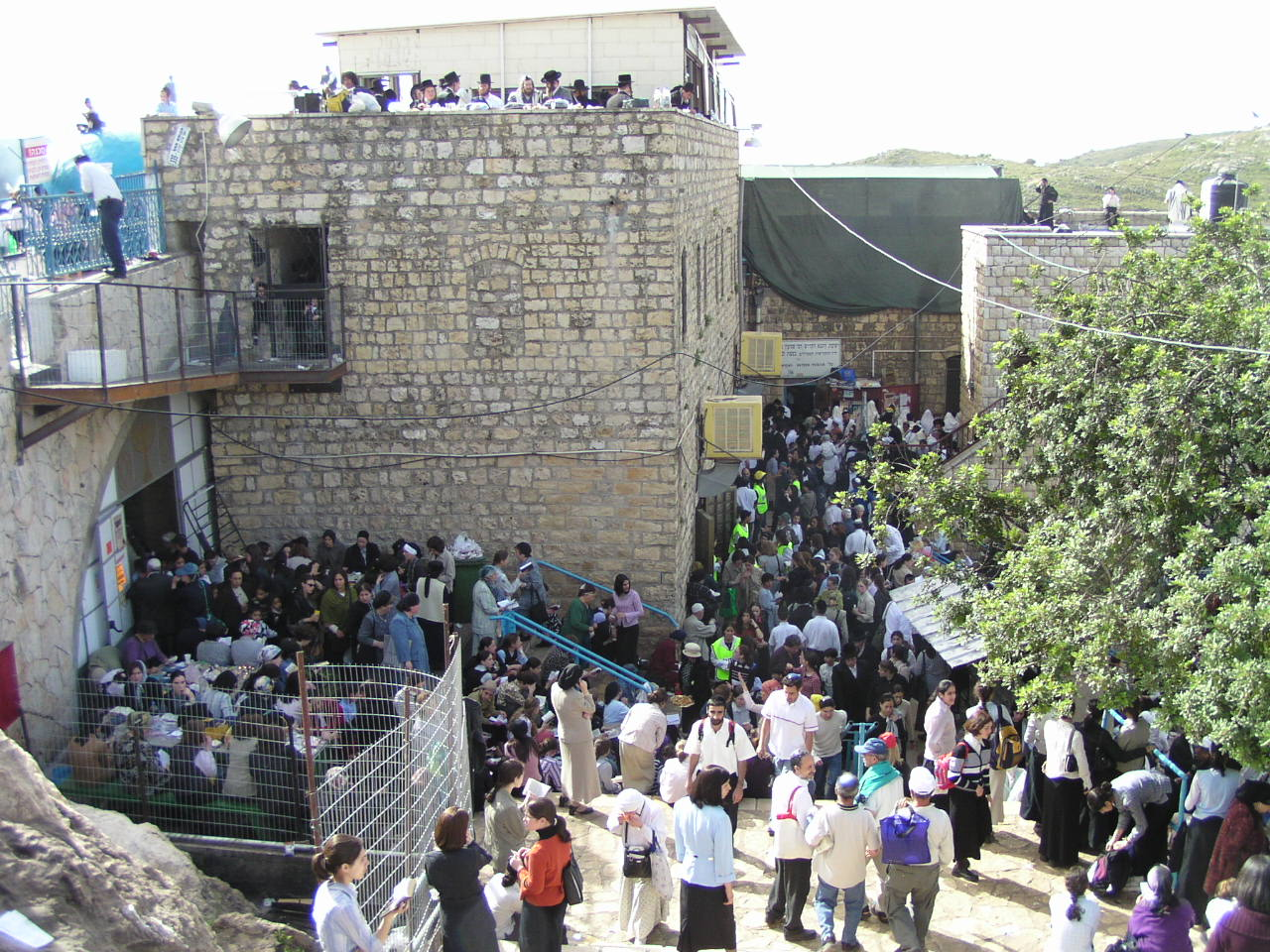
The tomb of Rabbi Shimon bar Yochai in Meron during his Hiloula, in Lag Ba'omer.

A Yom Hillula (Hebrew: יום הילולא, day of festivity) is another word for yahrzeit or "death anniversary". However, it differs from a regular yahrzeit in two respects. It refers specifically to the yahrzeit of a great tzaddik "saint", and unlike a regular yahrzeit, which is marked with sadness or even fasting, a Yom Hillula is commemorated specifically through simcha "joy" and festive celebration.

The yom hillula is most often used in Hasidic Judaism to refer to the day of the death of rebbes (influential leaders), and also for historical thinkers and teachers of Kabbalah or Hasidic philosophy.

The observation of hilluloth for North African ascetic or mystical saints in Maghrebi Jewish communities is widespread, especially in Morocco, with the Hiloula of Rabbi Isaac Ben Walid and the Hiloula of Rabbi Haim Pinto among them, as well as the Baba Sali in the Israeli town of Netivot.

== Rabbi Shimon Bar Yochai ==
According to modern kabbalah, Lag BaOmer is the Hillula of Rabbi Shimon bar Yochai and/or the anniversary of his death. According to a late medieval tradition, Simeon ben Yochai is buried in Meron, and this association has spawned several well-known customs and practices on Lag BaOmer, including the lighting of bonfires and pilgrimages to Meron. The source for this idea appears to be a passage by Hayyim ben Joseph Vital, which read שמחת רשב״י "the celebration of Rabbi Shimon ben Yochai" but was mistakenly printed as שמת רשב״י "when Rabbi Shimon ben Yochai died", a difference of one letter. The actual origin of kabbalistic traditions of visiting Meron on any of several dates in the month of Iyar date to the Middle Ages; but it is not clear when, by whom, or in what way Lag baOmer was first connected to Shimon ben Yochai.

== See also ==
- Hillula of Rabbi Shimon bar Yochai
- Ohel (grave)
- Tzaddik
- Sufi saint festivals
