= Tomb of Rabbi Shimon bar Yochai =

Jewish pilgrimage site in Meron, Israel

- קבר רבי שמעון בר יוחאי (Hebrew)
- Kever Rashbi
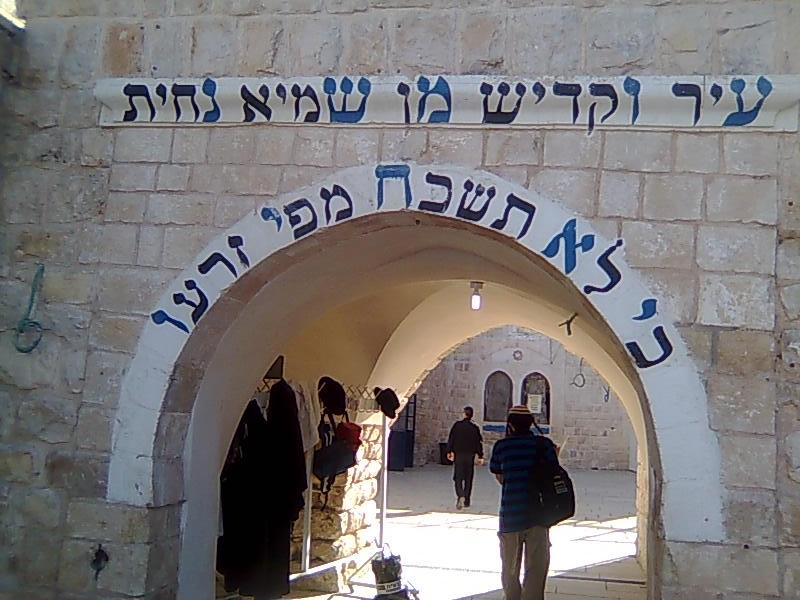
- Entrance to the tomb of Rabbi Shimon bar Yochai
- Interactive map of Tomb of Rabbi Shimon bar Yochai
- 32°58′51″N 35°26′26″E
- Type: Tomb
- Location: Meron, Israel
- Region: Galilee

Site notes
- Owner: Private
- Management: Ministry of Religious Services
- Public access: Yes

The tomb of Shimon bar Yochai (Hebrew: קבר רבי שמעון בר יוחאי), or Kever Rashbi (קבר רשב״י), on Mount Meron is the traditional burial place of the 2nd-century Mishnaic rabbi Shimon bar Yochai. A place of pilgrimage since the late 15th century, it is today the second-most-visited Jewish site in the world after the Western Wall with as many as two million annual visitors.

The tomb building was built in the mid-19th century by Shmuel Abu, the French consular agent in Safed.

== History and structure ==
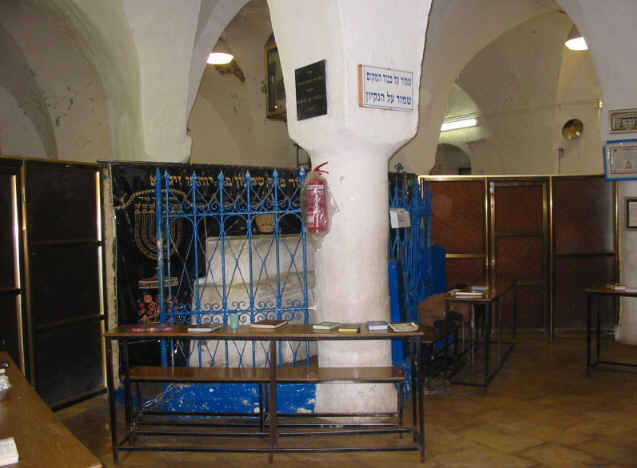
Mark (behind blue fence) over cave in which Rabbi Eleazar bar Shimon is buried. This main hall is divided in half in order to separate between men and women.

Jacob ben Netanel haKohen's 13th-century travelogue is the first document to place Shimon bar Yochai and his son's tombs in Meron. Abraham ben Mordecai Galante (16th century) is said to have built a mausoleum over the tomb. According to historian Elhanan Reiner, the tomb was managed by Musta'arabi Jews even before the expulsion from Spain and establishment of the Spanish Jewish community in Israel in the 16th century.

At the beginning of the 19th century, the area was purchased by Shmuel Abu, the French consular agent in Safed who had immigrated from Algeria in 1817. Shmuel Abu built the tomb building which now stands on the site. The tomb building was described in the late-19th-century PEF Survey of Palestine as "apparently a modern building." In 1956, Yosef Shenberger won a competition to renovate the building.

The large tomb structure has recognizable light blue domes and includes several rooms. In the large room in the southern corner is a tombstone marking the tomb of Rabbi Shimon bar Yochai. In the center of the room is another tombstone marking the tomb of Rabbi Eleazar, the son of Rabbi Shimon bar Yochai.

== Ownership ==
Ownership of the site is contested between rival Sephardic and Ashkenazic trusts, both of whom claim full ownership of the entire area citing hundreds of years’ precedent. Appeals to the courts have failed to settle the issue and the feud has allowed very little development to take place resulting in substandard facilities and safety concerns, the structure surrounding the tomb having become old and neglected. Millions of dollars in funding for redevelopment and refurbishment of the location were bequeathed by philanthropist Edmond Safra, but the quarreling between the parties is holding up release of the funds. An attempt by the state to take control over the site in 2011 to address health and safety concerns was met with anger by the private endowments operating the site and a court-approved settlement in 2020 ruled that control would remain with the owners.

== Annual pilgrimage ==
According to a modern Kabbalistic tradition, a pilgrimage is made to the tomb on Lag baOmer to mark either the Hillula of Rabbi Shimon bar Yochai or the anniversary of his death. The highlight of the event is the lighting of a bonfire at night on the roof of the tomb, after which joyous dancing begins. Various government bodies invest considerable sums of money and manpower resources to maintain order and ensure the flow of traffic to the site.

In 1949, Moshe-Zvi Neria organized a mass pilgrimage to the tomb following the Israeli victory in the 1948 Arab–Israeli War. This became the basis for an annual pilgrimage on 7 Adar, in addition to Lag BaOmer.

=== Bonfires ===
At the tomb of Rabbi Shimon, the honour of lighting the main bonfire traditionally goes to the Boyaner rebbes. This privilege was purchased by Avrohom Yaakov Friedman, the first Sadigura rebbe, from the Sephardi guardians of Meron and Safed. The Sadigura Rebbe bequeathed this honor to his eldest son, Yitzchok Friedman, the first Boyaner rebbe, and his progeny. The first hadlaka (lighting) is attended by hundreds of thousands of people annually; in 2001, the crowd was estimated at 300,000.

=== First haircut for boys ===
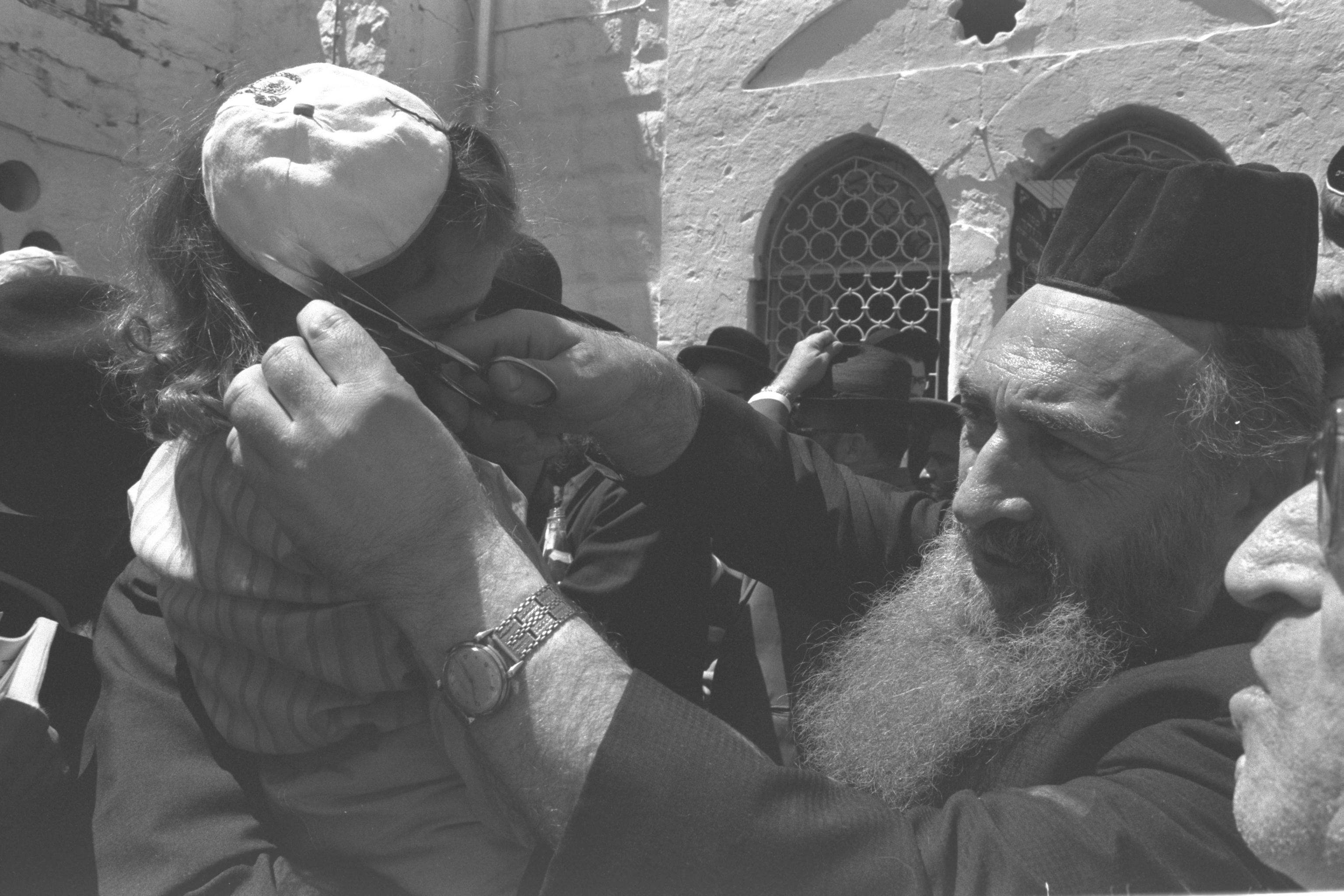
A rabbi performs the traditional Upsherin on a three-year-old boy in Meron on Lag Baomer 5730 (1970 CE).

A custom dating from the time of Isaac Luria holds that boys be given their upsherin "first haircuts" on Lag baOmer, and today this generally means the Lag baOmer after their third birthday. A large event for this purpose is held at Meron today, and similar celebrations are simultaneously held in Jerusalem at the grave of Simeon the Just for Jerusalemites.

=== Donations of drinks ===
It is traditional to donate 18 rotel (Hebrew: ח״י רוטל, around 18 gallons) of cold drinks (including wine, juice, soda or water) to be given to pilgrims at the tomb on Lag BaOmer, which falls in the hot season, especially for people recovering from sickness and those trying to find a marriage partner, conceive a child, or on find a job.

== Mass deaths ==
=== 1911 collapse ===
On 15 May 1911, eleven people were killed when a crowd of about 10,000 filled the compound and a railing of a nearby balcony collapsed. About 100 people fell from a height of roughly seven metres to the ground below; the deaths of seven were determined at the scene and of four others in the days following the incident. There were 40 injured.

=== 2021 stampede ===
On 30 April 2021, at about 00:50 IDT, a deadly crowd crush occurred in Meron during the annual pilgrimage to Mount Meron on the Jewish holiday of Lag BaOmer, at which about 100,000 people were in attendance. Forty-five people were killed, and more than 150 injured, dozens of them critically, making it the deadliest civil disaster in the history of Israel.

== Gallery ==
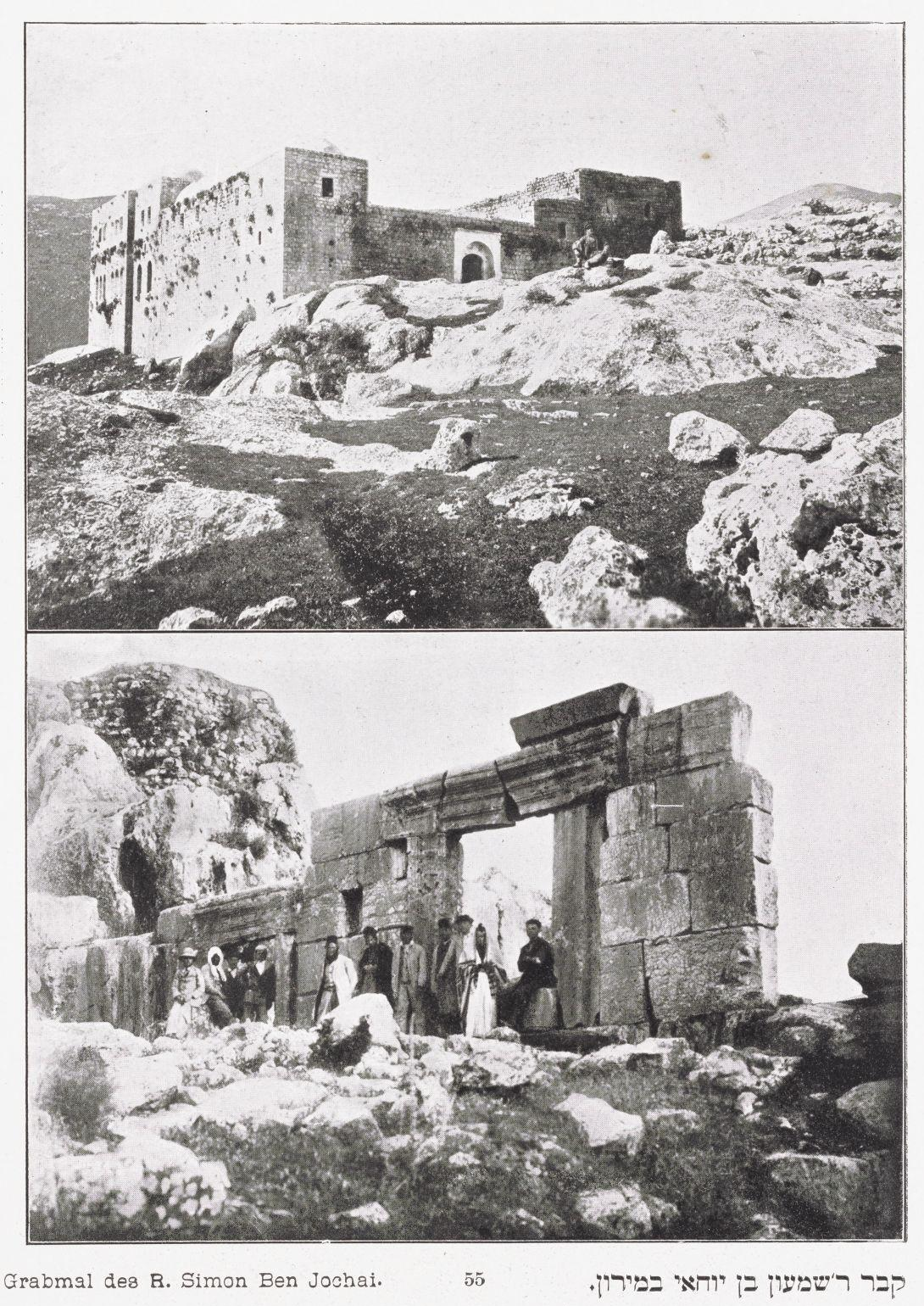
"Tomb of Simeon ben Yochai" / Nearby ruins popularly believed to be his study house

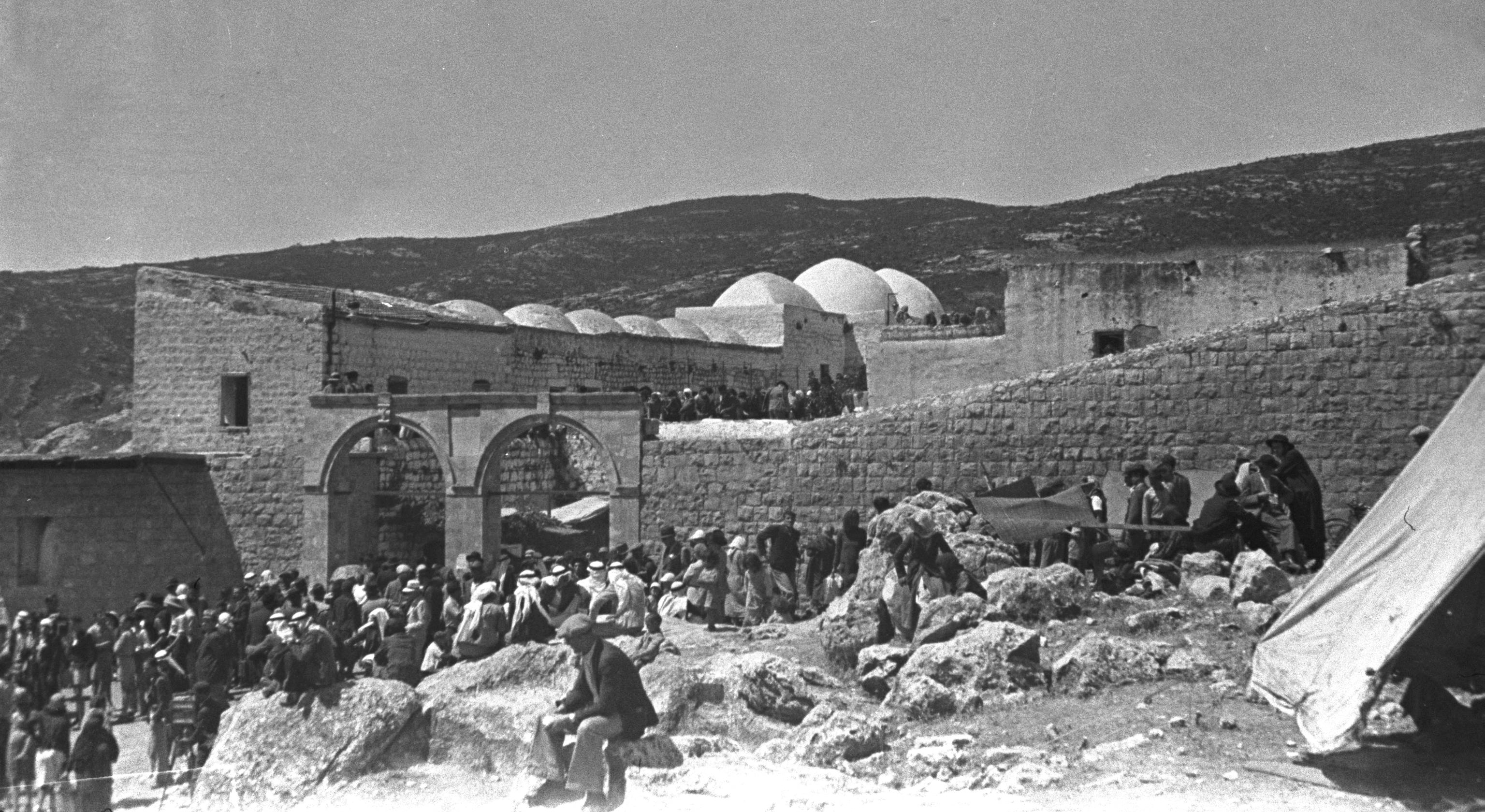
Lag BaOmer, 1939

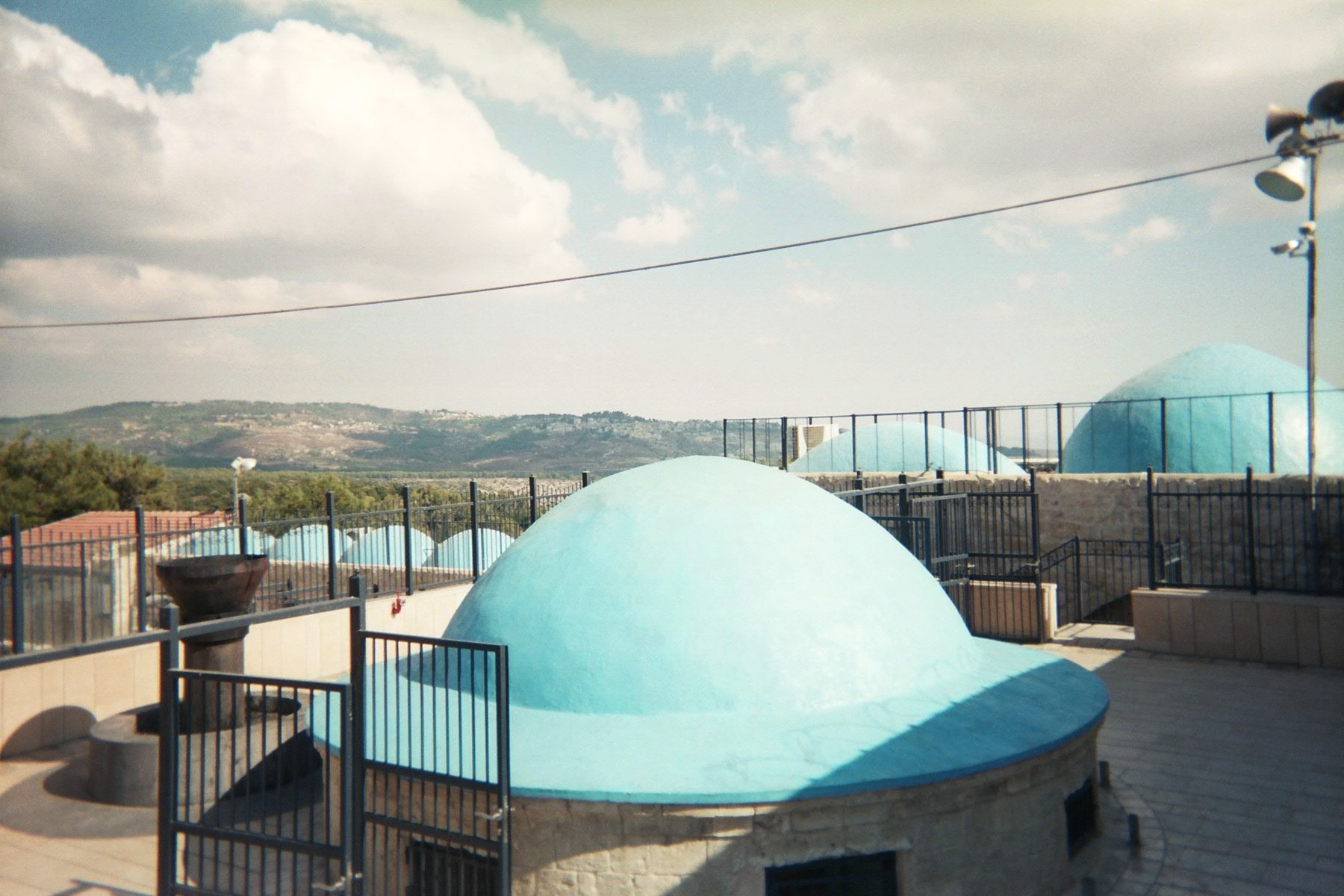
Dome above tomb

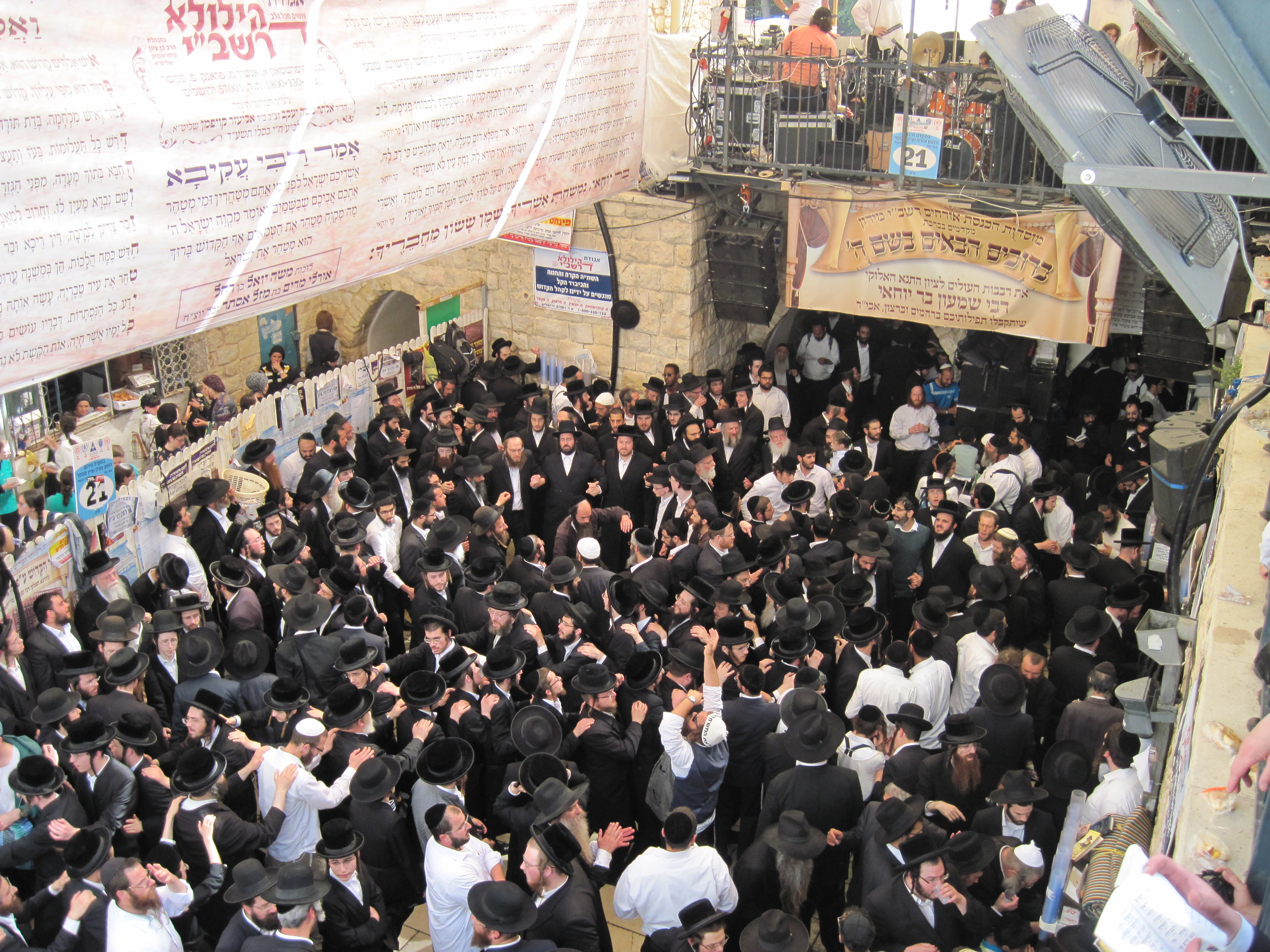
Crowds at the tomb

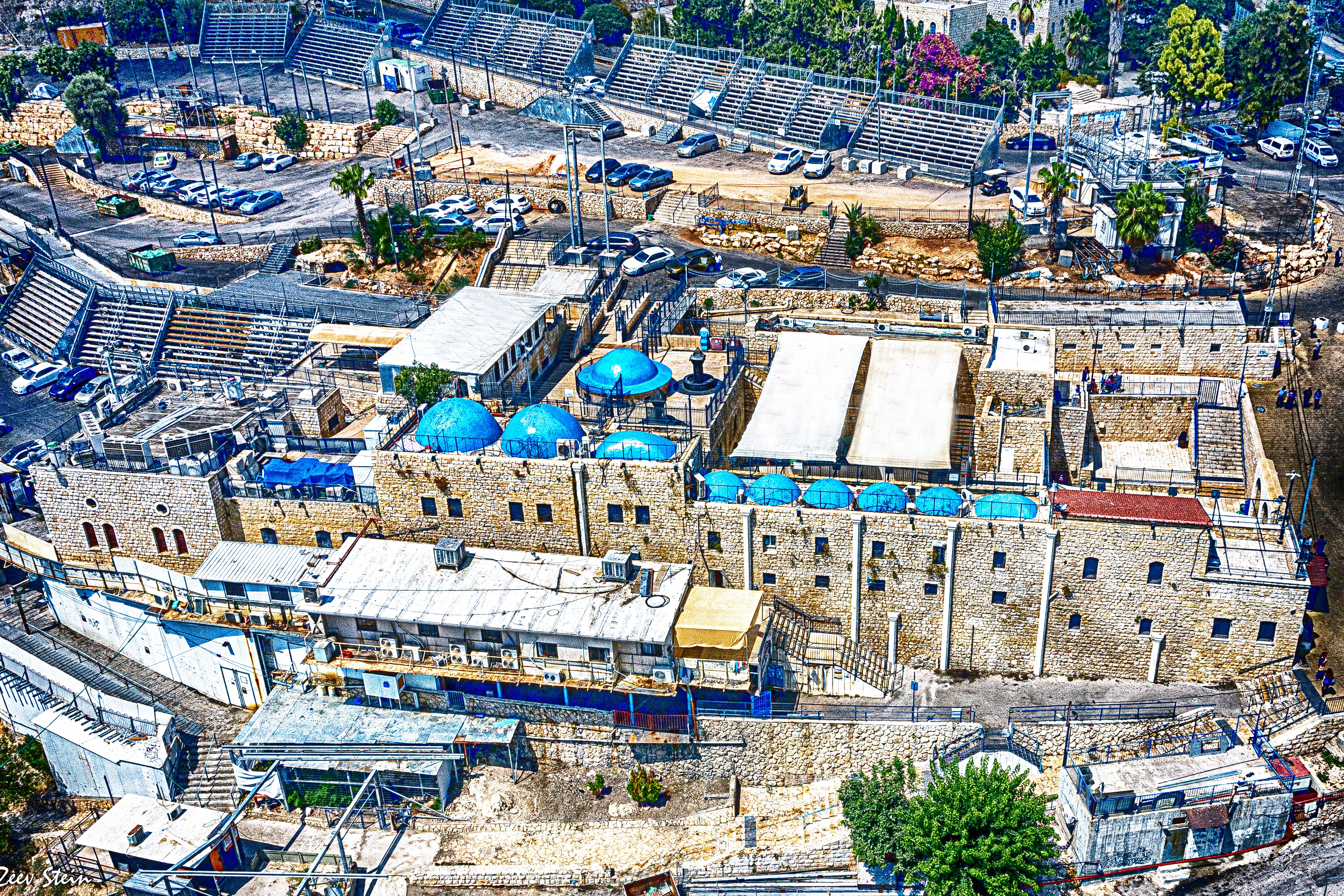
Aerial view of the complex

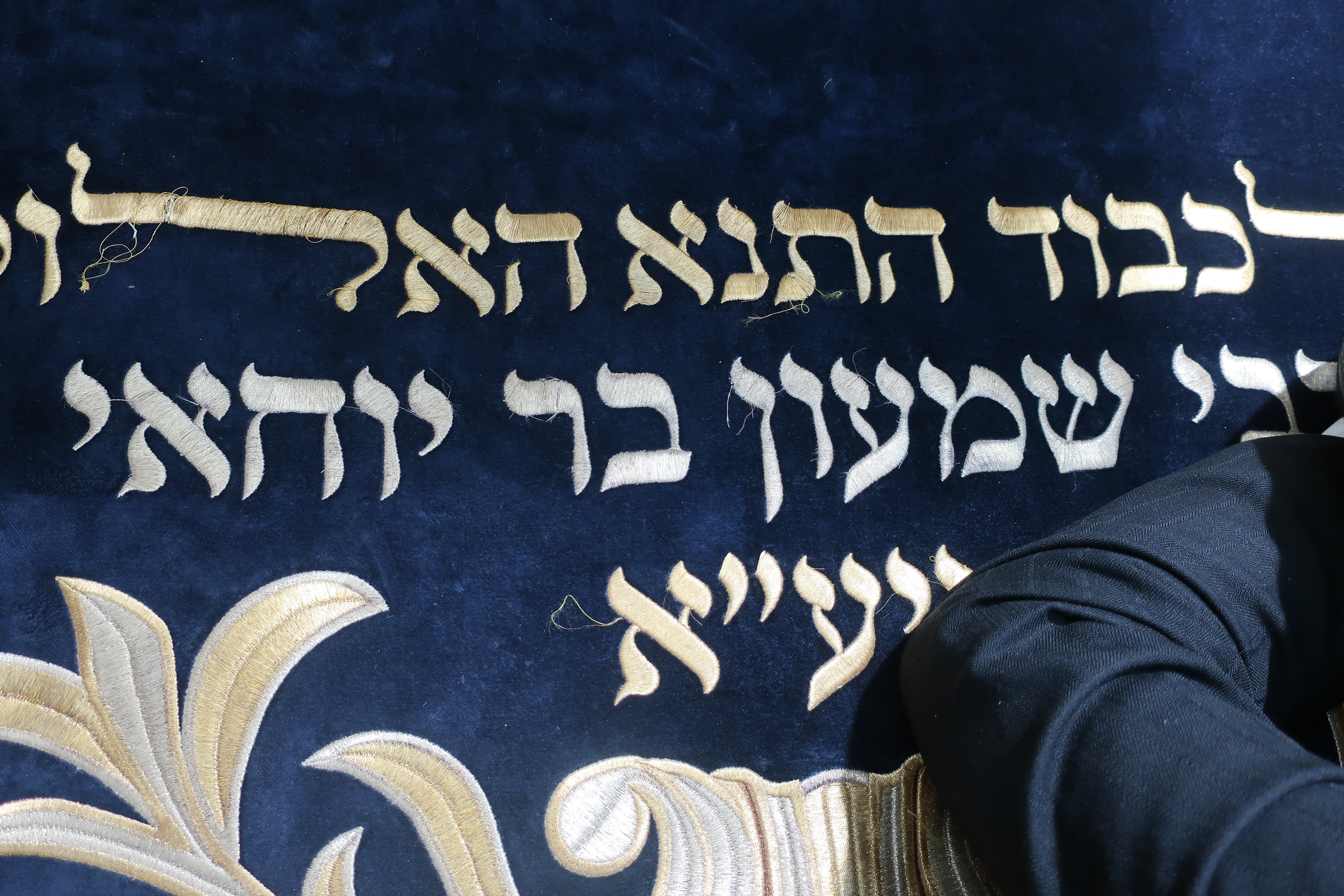
Tomb marker at the burial site of Rabbi Shimon Bar Yochai

== See also ==
- Lag BaOmer
- 2021 Meron crowd crush
