= 2021 in Israel =

- Decades: 2000s; 2010s; 2020s
- See also: History of Israel; Timeline of Israeli history; List of years in Israel

Events in the year 2021 in Israel.

== Incumbents ==
- President of Israel – Reuven Rivlin until 7 July; Isaac Herzog
- Prime Minister of Israel – Benjamin Netanyahu until 13 June; Naftali Bennett
- President of the Supreme Court – Esther Hayut
- Chief of General Staff – Aviv Kochavi
- Government of Israel – thirty-fifth government of Israel and thirty-sixth government of Israel

== Events ==
=== January ===
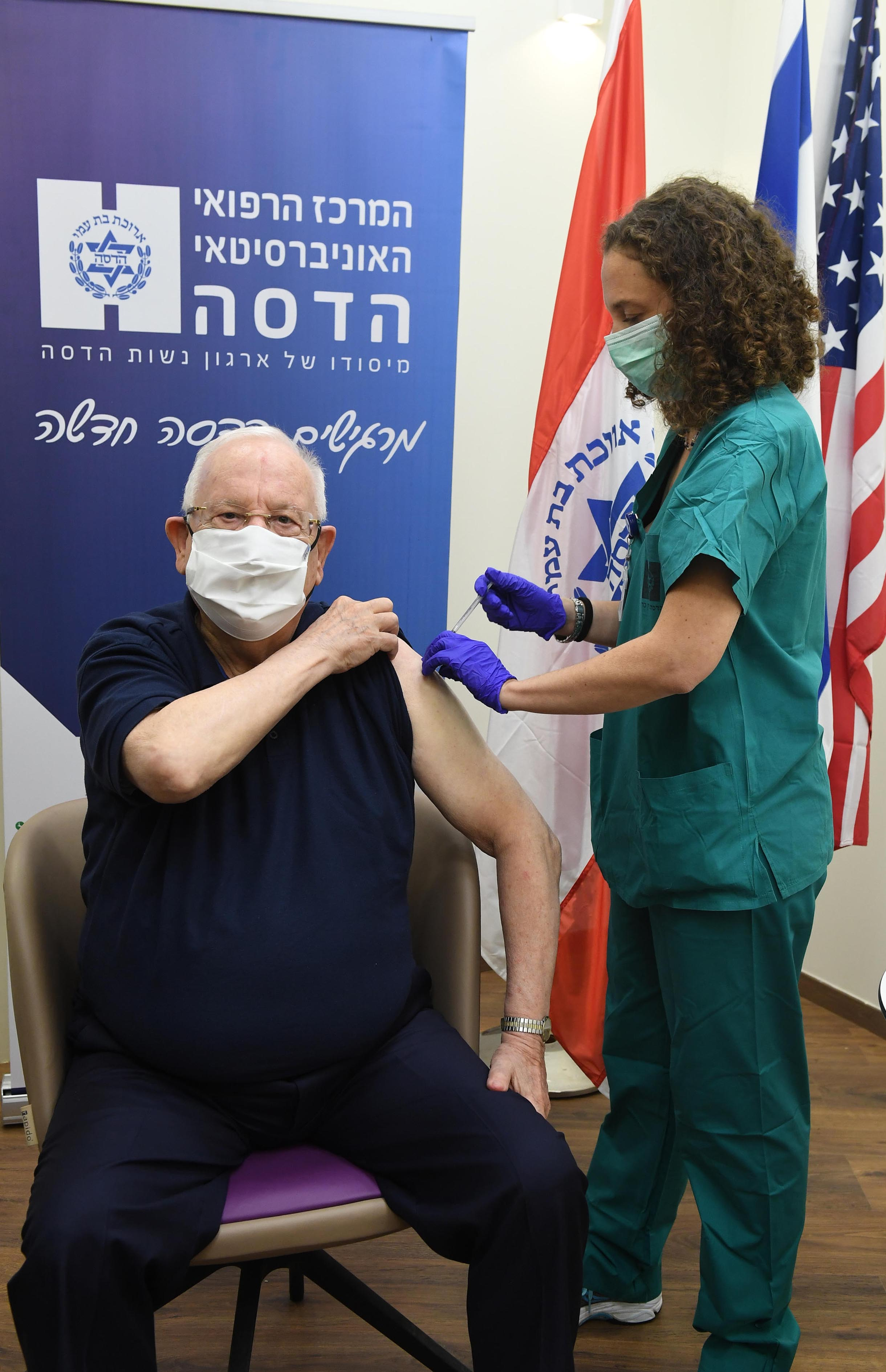
10 January: President Reuven Rivlin receives his second dose at Hadassah Medical Center during the COVID-19 vaccination program.

- 1 January – Israel becomes the first country to reach the milestone of one million COVID-19 vaccinations, over 11% of the population, since the inoculation campaign began on 20 December 2020.
- 13 January – The Israeli Air Force launches a series of airstrikes against Iranian targets in the Deir ez-Zor Governorate of Syria, killing dozens.
- 5 January – The Israeli Cabinet agrees to tighten the nationwide lockdown by closing schools and non-essential shops for 14 days. The measures will come into force at midnight between Thursday and Friday.
- 6 January –
  - Israel launches airstrikes against IRGC and Hezbollah bases near Damascus, Syria.
  - Sudan formally signs the Abraham Accords as part of an agreement to normalize relations with Israel.
- 8 January – Another hearing of Israeli Prime Minister Benjamin Netanyahu standing trial on charges of a litany of corruption accusations, including bribery, breach of trust, and fraud is postponed due to quarantine lockdown.
- 9 January – Prime Minister Benjamin Netanyahu becomes the first Israeli to get a second dose of Pfizer's tozinameran vaccine as the country begins administering second doses of the vaccine to the public.
- 13 January – 57 killed and 28 injured in 18 Israeli airstrikes on Iranian arms depots in Deir ez-Zor Governorate, Syria, on "intelligence provided by the CIA.
- 17 January – The government approves the appointment of Kobi Shabtai as the Commissioner of the Israel Police, following a two-year period without a permanent appointee.
- 19 January – Israel extends their third nationwide lockdown until January 31 due to the highest number of cases reported and announces the requirement all travelers to present a negative COVID-19 test result within 72 hours of arrival or face a fine of ₪ 2,500 ($772).
- 22 January –
  - A family of four, with two children killed in Israeli airstrikes on five Syrian military targets in Hama, Syria, destroys five Syrian military sites.
  - Six ultra-Orthodox Jews are arrested in a riot in Bnei Brak that started when an unmarked police was stoned.
  - Israeli businessman Beny Steinmetz is sentenced by a court in Geneva, Switzerland to five years in prison for corruption in obtaining mining rights to an iron ore deposit in Guinea, and is ordered to pay a fine of CHF 50 million (US$56 million) to the canton of Geneva.
- 24 January –
  - Israel opens an embassy in the United Arab Emirates with Eitan Na'eh as head of mission, in a temporary office until a permanent location is set up.
  - Haredi protestors riot in Bnei Brak against COVID restrictions.
- 25 January –
  - Israel extradites Malka Leifer to Melbourne, Australia, where she faces 74 charges in the Adass Israel School sex abuse scandal, after a six-year legal battle to extradite her.
  - The government bans all commercial flights into Israel until 31 January, to prevent the spread of more contagious variants of the COVID-19 virus.
  - Clashes broke out in three cities across Israel as police attempted to enforce coronavirus lockdown restrictions in a number of ultra-Orthodox communities. Israel is currently in a COVID-19 pandemic lockdown. (Times of Israel)
  - Several cases of a faster-spreading variant of SARS-CoV-2 is reported in Israel, which was recently discovered in the United States.
- 26 January – A Palestinian man is shot and killed by an IDF soldier for attempting to stab two soldiers at a road junction near Nablus in the West Bank, is shot and killed by an Israeli commander.
- 31 January –
  - The first reinfection case of the South African 501.V2 variant is reported in a 57-year-old man who recently travelled to Turkey and who previously recovered from COVID-19.
  - The Israeli Health Ministry agrees to transfer 5,000 doses of COVID-19 vaccine to the Palestinians to immunize frontline medical workers.

=== February ===
- 1 February – In an online signing ceremony, Kosovo and Israel establish diplomatic relations, and Kosovo becomes the first Muslim-majority state to recognize Jerusalem as Israel's capital, committing to open its embassy in Jerusalem.
- 3 February – IAF launches airstrikes on Southern Syria, with Syrian forces responded.
- 5 February –
  - The International Criminal Court announces that it will pave the way for investigations into alleged war crimes in Palestinian territories. Israel and groups like Hamas could be investigated.
  - Israel announces that it will ease its lockdown measures beginning February 7. People will no longer be restricted to within one kilometer of their homes, many services will be allowed to operate, and all national parks will reopen. However, international borders will remain closed until February 20.
- 8 February –
  - Prime Minister Benjamin Netanyahu appears in the Jerusalem District Court for a hearing in his corruption trial and formally denies the charges against him.
  - Greek Prime Minister Kyriakos Mitsotakis and Israeli Prime Minister Benjamin Netanyahu sign an accord that would allow vaccinated travellers to visit freely between the two countries without any restrictions in order to revive their battered tourism sector.
  - Israeli Prime Minister Benjamin Netanyahu pleads not guilty to charges of bribery, breach of trust and fraud at the Jerusalem District Court.
- 11 February – Aharon Haliva is appointed head of Aman.
- 14 February – Cypriot President Nicos Anastasiades and Israeli Prime Minister Benjamin Netanyahu announce an agreement to allow vaccinated travelers to travel between the countries without the need to quarantine in order to restore their countries' tourism industries.
- 15 February – Six foreign nationals killed in Israeli airstrikes on the Syrian Army's 4th Armoured Division headquarters and Iranian weapons and missile depots near Damascus, Syria.
- 16 February – Health Minister Mai al-Kaila accuses Israel of blocking the delivery of 2,000 doses of the Sputnik V vaccine to the Gaza Strip, intended for ICU and emergency staff.
- 17 February –
  - The Israeli Maccabi Healthcare Services confirm that, in a trial of 602,000 people who received the Pfizer-BioNTech vaccine, the vaccine's effectiveness was 95%.
  - The first shipment of the Sputnik V vaccine donated by Russia arrives in Gaza after Israel allows the shipment of 1,000 vaccines, which was previously blocked.
- 18 February – Israel and Syria carry out a Russian-mediated prisoner exchange. An Israeli woman who crossed the border into Syria's Quneitra Governorate and was detained by the Syrian military, is returned in exchange for two Syrian shepherds held by the Israel Defense Forces.
- 19 February – Equatoguinean President Teodoro Obiang Nguema Mbasogo announces that the Equatoguinean embassy will be moved from Tel Aviv to Jerusalem following discussion with Israeli Prime Minister Benjamin Netanyahu.
- 20 February –
  - More than half of Israel's Mediterranean coastline is contaminated by tar from oil spilled at sea, causing a major ecological disaster including widespread death of marine and coastal wildlife and illness to a number of volunteers who assist with clean up on the beaches. The Israel Nature and Parks Authority calls the spill "one of the most serious ecological disasters" in the country's history.
  - The Health Ministry reports that data of COVID-19 vaccines are 99.2% effective against serious illness, reduce mortality by 95.8% and decrease the chance of hospitalization by 98.9%.
- 21 February – Israel reopens many sectors of their economy as part of an easing of lockdown restrictions, with the exception of access to leisure sites is limited to people who have received a vaccine or who have recovered from COVID-19.
- 26 February – An explosion occurs on the Israeli-owned cargo ship MV Helios Ray in the Gulf of Oman with no injuries reported of the ship's crew with Iran suspected as being responsible.

=== March ===
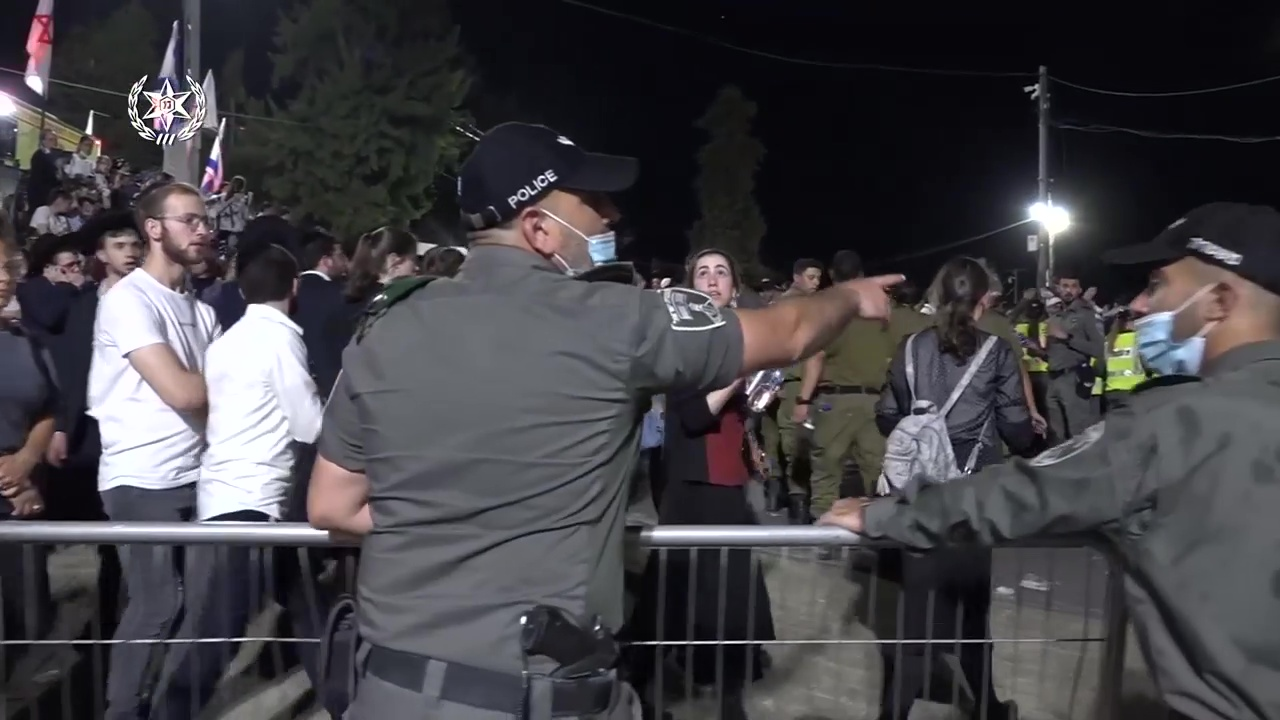
30 April: Israeli police working to evacuate Mount Meron following the deadly Meron crowd crush at the Tomb of Rabbi Shimon bar Yochai that killed 45 and injured 150 on April 30

- 1 March – The Israeli Supreme Court rules that the government must recognize Reform and Conservative converts to Judaism in Israel as Jews for the purpose of the Law of Return, entitled to Israeli citizenship in the same way as Orthodox converts.
- 7 March –
  - Three Palestinian fishermen are killed in an explosion off the coast of Gaza. The blast is caused by an unknown weapon, suspected to be a rocket.
  - Israel announces the reopening of restaurants, bars, and other entertainment venues for the vaccinated with some middle-school reopened in some areas and university classes also resume for the vaccinated. Israeli citizens are also allowed to return to Israel without any special permissions.
- 8 March – Cyprus, Greece, and Israel sign an agreement to build the world's largest and deepest submarine power cable that will connect the three Mediterranean countries' power grids at a cost of about $900 million. The project is expected to be completed by 2024.
- 11 March – U.S. and Arab officials disclose the confirmation of Israeli naval vessels clandestinely operating against Iranian vessels in the Persian Gulf, Mediterranean Sea and Red Sea transporting of oil fuel and weaponry to Syria since 2019. At least twelve Iranian vessels have been attacked with limpet mines, according to U.S. officials.
- 17 March –
  - Archaeologists announce the discovery of additional Qumrannic Scrolls for the first time in 60 years.
  - Israel becomes the country with the highest vaccinated population per capita in the world against COVID-19.
- 23 March – The fourth legislative election in two years takes place to elect the 120 members of the 24th Knesset, with no bloc apparently winning a majority.

=== April ===
- 6 April –
  - An Islamic Revolutionary Guard Corps Navy reconnaissance vessel Saviz is struck by several Israeli limpet mines off the coast of Eritrea in the Red Sea in retaliation for earlier Iranian strikes on Israeli vessels. A Pentagon spokesperson denies any U.S. involvement in the attack on the Iranian ship and that the IDF announces responsibility.
  - The cabinet of Sudan repeals a 1958 law that prohibits establishing relations with Israel, nearly five months after the two countries agreed to normalize ties.
- 11 April –
  - Israeli media claims that Mossad is responsible for a cyber attack on the Natanz nuclear facility in Iran that caused a blackout.
  - An Israeli study finds that the Pfizer–BioNTech vaccine may be less effective against the South African variant when compared to other strains of the virus.
- 13 April – A missile strikes the Israeli-owned cargo ship MV Hyperion Ray off the coast of the United Arab Emirates. Iran is suspected as being responsible.
- 15 April – Israeli airstrikes hit a Hamas armaments production facility and a weapon smuggling tunnel in the Gaza Strip in retaliation for rocket attacks.
- 18 April – The outdoor mask mandate is lifted and schools fully reopened following the reduction of COVID-19 cases and majority vaccination, with the exception of mandatory masks in indoor public spaces.
- 21 April –
  - An IDF veteran sets himself on fire near the Defense Ministry’s Rehabilitation Department for injured soldiers.
  - Israeli airstrikes launched against Syrian military targets after a Syrian launched S-200 missile landed 30 kilometres (19 mi) away from the Shimon Peres Negev Nuclear Research Center in Southern Israel.
- 23 April – More than 120 people are injured in clashes in Jerusalem between ultra-nationalist Jewish demonstrators (including Lehava extremists), Palestinian protestors, and Israel Police in response to a TikTok video showing Palestinians assaulting members of the Jerusalem ultra-Orthodox community.
- 24 April – Israel is hit by at least 35 Hamas rockets amidst yesterday's clashes between far-right Jewish demonstrators and Palestinians in Jerusalem. Israel retaliates with shelling of the Gaza Strip.
- 27 April – A report published by Human Rights Watch accuses Israel of committing a crime of apartheid against the Palestinian people.
- 30 April –
  - During a mass gathering at the Tomb of Rabbi Shimon bar Yochai in Mount Meron to celebrate Lag BaOmer, 45 people are crushed to death while trying to exit through a narrow passage. Most victims belong to the Toldos Aharon hasidic movement.
  - President Mahmoud Abbas announces the postponement of the election scheduled for May 22 until further notice, after the government of Israel allegedly rejected the holding of the election in East Jerusalem. Abbas announces that the election cannot be held without the participation of the disputed area.

=== May ===
- 2 May – The Jerusalem District Court orders at least six families residing in the Sheikh Jarrah neighborhood in East Jerusalem to vacate their homes, following decades of litigation by Jewish settler organizations claiming they are the rightful owners of the property. Hamas condemns this ruling as "dangerous, racist behavior", threatening retaliation.
- 5 May –
  - Israel launches missiles at Masyaf, Syria, killing one person and injuring six others. Several more missiles are intercepted, including one which reached the port city of Latakia.
  - Israeli President Reuven Rivlin taps Yair Lapid, leader of the oppositional centrist party Yesh Atid, to form a new government after Prime Minister Benjamin Netanyahu failed to form one yesterday.
- 6 May – Violent clashes break out between Palestinians rioters and Israeli police in Sheikh Jarrah and the Old City of Jerusalem.
- 7 May –
  - At least 178 Palestinians are injured in clashes with Israeli police at the al-Aqsa Mosque and elsewhere in East Jerusalem.
  - The United Kingdom adds Israel to the "green list" concerning the quarantine status of the arrivals of international travellers.
- 8 May – 90 Palestinians injured in clashes between Palestinian protesters and Israeli police in East Jerusalem's Old City
- 9 May – The Israeli Supreme Court agrees to delay its ruling on whether Palestinian residents in East Jerusalem's Sheikh Jarrah neighborhood can be evicted to make way for Jewish settlers to later this month, following a series of violent clashes between Israeli police and Palestinian protesters over this issue.
- 10 May – Barrages of rockets are launched from Gaza at Israel with seven rockets landing in Jerusalem, injuring one person. Israel retaliates with airstrikes at Gaza killing 24, including nine children and a Hamas leader, and injuring 103.
- 11 May –
  - Eight people killed and several others injured in Israeli airstrikes at the Gaza Strip, bringing the total death toll from the strikes to 32, and destroying the Hanadi Tower. Hamas retaliates with a barrage of rocket launches towards Israel, reaching as far as Tel Aviv, killing three people.
  - An Israeli-Arab man is killed and two more are wounded after a Jewish gunman opens fire against a group of protestors in Lod.
  - Palestinian actress Maisa Abd Elhadi is injured after being shot by Israel Police in Haifa.
  - Protests break out in London, New York City, and other cities across the world expressing solidarity with Palestine. In Manhattan, pro-Palestinian protesters gather at the Israeli consulate on East 42nd Street. Additionally, U.S. Reps Rashida Tlaib and André Carson participate in a protest at the State Department in Washington, D.C.
- 12 May –
  - 37 killed in Israeli airstrikes on the Gaza Strip, thereby bringing the death toll to 69 with 390 injured. Among the victims are a five-year-old child and their parents, who died when a residential building collapsed, while five more are farmers killed at their farms. The number of children killed rises to seventeen. The main Palestinian headquarters and all of the police stations in Gaza are destroyed by the strikes. Three killed in protests in the West Bank.
  - Three additional people are killed by Hamas' rockets in Lod, while an IDF soldier is killed as a military jeep outside Gaza is bombed, thereby bringing the Israeli death toll to seven.
  - The Israel Defense Forces says that it has conducted a "complex and first-of-its-kind operation" in the Gaza Strip, killing several senior members of Hamas.
  - Prime Minister Benjamin Netanyahu declares a state of emergency in the city of Lod following rioting between Arabs and Jews. It is the first use of emergency powers over an Arab community in Israel since 1966.
  - Protests against the 2021 Israel–Palestine crisis
  - Protesters gather in Paris, France, in support of Palestine following attacks on the Al-Aqsa Mosque and Gaza Strip getting dispersed by police.
  - Protests break out in Chicago, Illinois, at the Chicago Loop in opposition to Israel's occupation.
  - In Milwaukee, protesters gather near The Calling sculpture in opposition to Israel's occupation.
- 12 May –
  - The death toll from the airstrikes in the Gaza Strip increases to 113 people, with 600 injured. The IDF launches multiple raids on Rafah with 35 Palestinian injured in protests continue in the West Bank. The number of children killed also increases to 31.
  - The Israel Defense Forces says that it has deployed two infantry units and an armoured unit to the border on the Hamas-controlled Gaza Strip, and that a ground operation inside Gaza will be submitted to military chiefs later today, ahead of a potential approval by the Israeli government.
  - Israeli strikes destroy Hamas' internal security headquarters and Gaza's central bank, as the spokesman of the al-Qassam Brigades, the armed wing of Hamas, says that the group has launched "massive rocket strikes", larger than any launched on Israel since the 1948 Arab–Israeli War.
  - Kenya Police fire tear gas in clashes with pro-Palestinian protesters in Nairobi.
  - Leader of the right-wing Yamina coalition Naftali Bennett calls off talks with oppositional leader Yair Lapid to form a new government in light of escalating violence. He instead voices his support for a unity government.
- 14 May –
  - The death toll from Israeli airstrikes and shellings on Gaza increases to 137 people with more than 920 injured. The Shati refugee camp is hit by bombings, resulting in the death of ten people, including eight children, thereby bringing the number of children killed to 36. The death toll in Israel rises to nine people killed, including a six-year-old boy. The International Criminal Court says that individuals involved in the conflict may be targeted by an investigation into war crimes. Violence also continues in the West Bank, with Israeli settlers attacking Palestinian homes in the city of Hebron, while eleven protestors in the West Bank are shot dead by soldiers, bringing the number of Palestinian protestors killed there to 15.
  - Two Lebanese men are killed during protests at the border against Israeli soldiers.
  - Italian Health Minister Roberto Speranza signs a decree that removes quarantine rules for COVID-19 negative testing Israeli travelers. The decree will take effect on May 16.
  - Czech Republic President Miloš Zeman orders the Israeli flag to fly at the Prague Castle to show support for the country amidst its conflict with Palestine.
  - Jordan police disperse protesters who are trying to reach the Allenby Bridge near the border with Israel. Additionally, protesters from Lebanon also reach the Israeli border.
  - Pro-Palestinian protesters storm the Queensway tunnel in the United Kingdom, disrupting traffic.
  - A court in France bans pro-Palestinian protests planned in Paris. However, activists say that protests will go as planned.
- 15 May –
  - The death toll from Israeli airstrikes on the al-Shati and Bureij refugee camps Gaza rises to 145 people with 950 injured, including 41 children. Two protesters are killed in the West Bank. The headquarters of many media organizations in Gaza, including Al Jazeera and the Associated Press, are destroyed by bombings. An Israeli man is killed by a rocket in Ramat Gan, in Tel Aviv District, another person is also killed in another city, bringing the death toll there to 10.
  - Prime Minister Benjamin Netanyahu says that airstrikes on Gaza will continue "as long as needed". He also warns Hamas leaders not to hide and that nobody is immune.
  - Iranian Foreign Minister Mohammad Javad Zarif cancels a trip to Austria after Austrian Chancellor Sebastian Kurz orders the Israeli flag to be raised at the Chancellery and Foreign Affairs buildings yesterday.
  - The Jammu and Kashmir Police arrest 21 people in Kashmir, India, for organizing protests in support of Palestine.
  - Police in Paris, France, use tear gas and water cannons against pro-Palestinian protesters. This comes a day after a French court banned protests in support of Palestine.
  - Protesters gather in London and Madrid in solidarity with Palestine. In London, protesters gather at Hyde Park and the Israeli embassy. Former Labour Leader Jeremy Corbyn also speaks at the London protest.
  - In the United States, protests are held in Atlanta, Boston, Louisville, Los Angeles, New York City, Philadelphia, and other cities to demand an end to Israeli airstrikes in the Gaza Strip.
  - In Toronto, several pro-Israel protesters are injured in clashes with pro-Palestine protesters at the Nathan Phillips Square.
- 16 May –
  - 42 killed in Gaza City in Israel airstrikes with the total death toll rising to 192 people, including 58 children and 34 women.
  - Hamas fires over 190 rockets at southern Israel, damaging numerous buildings, including a synagogue. Approximately 3,000 rockets have been fired in the past week.
  - The Israeli Air Force destroys the office and home of Yahya Sinwar, the most senior Hamas official in Gaza.
  - A convoy covered with Palestinian flags drives through North London shouting antisemitic language. Four people are arrested on suspicion of racially aggravated public order offenses.
  - In Berlin, violent confrontations break out during a protest against Israeli airstrikes in the Gaza Strip, with an Israeli TV reporter being attacked.
  - Montreal Police deploy tear gas to disperse a protest in downtown Montreal, which saw pro-Israeli protesters clash with pro-Palestinian protesters.

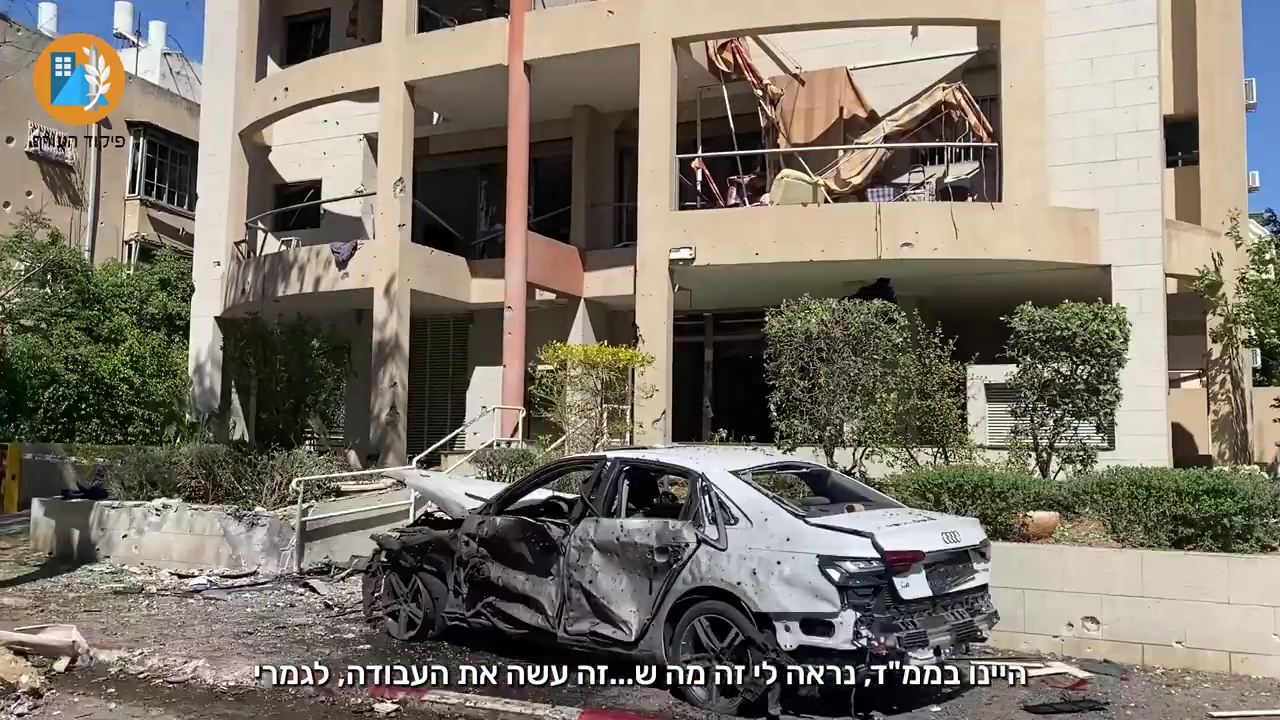
16 May: Aftermath of a Hamas missile hit on a residential building, Ramat Gan.

- 17 May –
  - Israeli Prime Minister Benjamin Netanyahu says that he has ordered the Israel Defense Forces to continue strikes in Gaza, including Hamas targets.
  - The death toll in Gaza from Israeli airstrikes rises to 212 people, including 61 children.
  - The Biden administration approves a $735-million weapons sale to Israel.
  - The offices of the Qatar branch of the Red Crescent Society is destroyed by an Israeli air strike, killing two Palestinians and wounding ten others. The Qatari Foreign Ministry condemns the attack.
  - The Israeli military shells southern Lebanon after several Grad-type rockets were fired at Israel.
  - Protesters gather in Sanaa, Yemen, to protest Israel's attacks on the Gaza Strip. During the protest, demonstrators are seen calling for a boycott of Israeli and American goods, as well as chanting "Death to America" and "Death to Israel".
- 18 May –
  - A Hamas rocket kills two Thai workers and injures ten others in southern Israel, thereby bringing the death toll in the country to 12.
  - The death toll from the Israeli airstrikes in Gaza rise to at least 217 Palestinians killed, including 63 children. About 1,500 others have been wounded. Gaza's main COVID-19 laboratory is destroyed by a strike, stopping all COVID-19 tests as a result. Four more protesters are also killed in the West Bank.
  - The IDF reports the death of 160 Hamas and Islamic Jihad members. However, the deaths are not confirmed by either the groups or Palestinian authorities, who reported a lower number of militants killed.
  - Israeli police fire stun grenades, rubber bullets, and spray skunk water at protesters gathered at the Damascus Gate in Jerusalem's Old City.
  - One Palestinian is killed and dozens more are wounded after Israeli security forces open fire on protesters marching at a military checkpoint in the Beit El settlement in the West Bank. Further clashes are also reported in Hebron, Bethlehem, Nablus, and Budrus.
  - Arab Americans in Dearborn, Michigan, stage a protest across the city during a visit by U.S. President Joe Biden to the Ford River Rouge Complex over the United States' support of Israel's response to attacks from Gaza.
  - Indonesians gather at the U.S. Embassy in Jakarta to stand in solidarity with Palestine and demand an end to Israeli airstrikes in Gaza.
  - Palestinians in the West Bank, East Jerusalem, and communities inside Israel hold a general strike to protest Israel's bombardment of the Gaza Strip and the evictions of Palestinians in Sheikh Jarrah. The Central Committee of Fatah calls it a "day of rage".
- 19 May –
  - Israeli Prime Minister Benjamin Netanyahu and Palestinian officials say that fighting between Israel and Palestine will continue while working toward a ceasefire.
  - The United States rejects a United Nations Security Council resolution that calls for a ceasefire in the conflict between Israel and Gaza.
  - Israel condemns an "antisemitic" report by China's state-owned China Global Television Network that claims that "wealthy Jews dominate the finance, media and internet sectors" in the United States. The report also claims that Israel is an American puppet state. The Israeli Foreign Ministry calls on CGTN to take down the video, citing its "racist and dangerous" ideas.
  - Pro-Palestinian protesters gather at a UAV factory in Leicester over its ties to Israel arms manufacture Elbit Systems.
  - In Kuwait, protesters burn Israeli flags and rally in support of Palestine. Protesters also reject normalization agreements signed by Bahrain and the United Arab Emirates.
- 20 May –
  - Israel and Hamas agree to a ceasefire. The past 11 days of conflict have killed 232 people in Gaza and 11 in Israel. Egypt agrees to observe the implementation of the ceasefire.
  - Upon following recommendations from the Council on Ethics, the Government Pension Fund of Norway drops two firms from its portfolio for doing business with illegal Israeli settlements in the occupied West Bank. The Norges Bank Investment Management also blacklists a company for owning factories in Myanmar.
  - In Midtown Manhattan, pro-Palestine and pro-Israel protesters clash at Times Square despite a ceasefire being announced between Israel and Hamas militants. One protester suffers a minor burn after fireworks were thrown from a car.
  - U.S. Senator Bernie Sanders of Vermont introduces a resolution that would block an arms sale of $735 million in weapons to Israel in response to the conflict between Israel and Gaza.
- 21 May –
  - Seven people are killed and 14 others are wounded in a bombing at a pro-Palestine solidarity rally in Chaman, Balochistan, Pakistan.
  - Ten more bodies are found under the rubble of bombed buildings in Gaza, thereby bringing the Palestinian death toll to 243. Despite this, the ceasefire agreed by Israel and Hamas begins.
  - Israeli security forces fire stun grenades and rubber bullets at Palestinians attending Friday prayers at Al-Aqsa Mosque, and they also hit journalists at the scene with batons, injuring at least 20 people.
  - Indonesian Islamists protest American support for Israel at the U.S. Embassy in Jakarta. Protesters also demand an end to Israeli airstrikes in the Gaza Strip despite the ceasefire going into force yesterday.
  - In Toronto, activists paint the Israeli consulate with a "river of blood" to symbolize the 200 Palestinians who were killed during the conflict.
- 22 May –
  - Bangladesh removes a passage from its passport saying that it cannot be used for travel to and from Israel, thereby formally lifting the travel ban.
  - Protests form outside the residence of Israeli Prime Minister Benjamin Netanyahu in Jerusalem, accusing him of intentionally escalating the conflict between Israel and the Gaza Strip in order to maintain his power.
  - Over 180,000 protesters gather in Hyde Park in London to show solidarity with Palestine, making it the largest pro-Palestinian protest in British history. Protests also occur in Bristol, Peterborough, and Nottingham.
- 23 May –
  - Israeli police announce they have arrested over 1,550 demonstrators, most of them Palestinians, since May 9 for allegedly disrupting the peace, and that they will arrest hundreds more in the upcoming days.
- 25 May – U.S. Secretary of State Antony Blinken announces the United States will reopen its consulate in Jerusalem at an unknown date.
- 26 May –
  - The Dáil Éireann, the Irish parliament unanimously passes a motion introduced by the oppositional Sinn Féin condemning the Israeli settlements as representing a de facto annexation of Palestinian land, making Ireland the first European Union member to make such a condemnation. Yesterday, Foreign Affairs Minister Simon Coveney called for the government to adopt the motion. However, an amendment calling for the Israeli ambassador to be expelled and for sanctions to be placed on Israel was rejected by a vote of 87–43.
  - Qatari Foreign Minister Mohammed bin Abdulrahman bin Jassim Al Thani pledges US$500 million to help rebuild the Gaza Strip following the cessation in violence between Palestine and Israel.
- 27 May –
  - The UN Human Rights Council authorizes an open-ended investigation into human rights violations committed during the conflict. The Palestinian National Authority welcomes the decision, while Israeli Prime Minister Benjamin Netanyahu condemns it as "yet another example of the UN Human Rights Council's blatant anti-Israel obsession," and declares that Israel will not cooperate with the probe.
- 28 May – Zakaria Hamayel, a 28-year-old Palestinian man is shot and killed by Israeli forces during a protest near Nablus.
- 10–21 May – Israel conducts aerial attacks dubbed "Operation Guardian of the Walls" in response to Hamas rocket attacks into Israeli territory – during the eleven-day campaign, more than 4,360 rockets and mortar shells are fired at Israel, of which 3,573 penetrate Israeli airspace, about 680 fall short inside the Gaza Strip and about 280 fall into the sea; the Iron Dome aerial defense system intercepts about 90% of the rocket fire; eleven Israeli civilians are directly killed by the rocket and mortar fire, two die as they run for shelter, several hundred are injured, and one soldier is killed when an anti-tank rocket hit his jeep; the rocket attacks force millions of civilians into bomb shelters and disrupt routine daily life throughout the country.
- 10–17 May – Arab-Israeli protests and riots occur, particularly in towns with large Arab populations, and in intercommunal violence, Arab rioters set ten synagogues and 112 Jewish homes on fire, loot 386 Jewish homes and damaged another 673, and set 849 Jewish cars on fire and there are 5,018 recorded instances of stone-throwing against Jews; Jewish rioters damaged 13 Arab homes and set 13 Arab cars on fire, and there are 41 recorded instances of stone-throwing against Arabs; several people from both communities are severely injured and two die.
- 16 May – Three killed and over 200 wounded on the night of Shavuot, due to a collapse of a tribune in a synagogue of the Carlin Stolin Hasidim in Givat Zeev.
- 20 May – The foreign ministers of Germany, Heiko Maas, the Czech Republic, Jakub Kulhánek, and Slovakia, Ivan Korčok, visit Israel in a show of solidarity.
- 22 May – Eden Alene represents Israel at the Eurovision Song Contest in Rotterdam with the song "Set Me Free".
- 30 May – The embassy of the United Arab Emirates opens in Tel Aviv.
- 31 May – U.S. Senator Lindsey Graham (R-SC) meets with Israeli Prime Minister Benjamin Netanyahu in Jerusalem amidst speculation that a new government will be formed in Israel. During the meeting, both men discussed protecting Israel from future Hamas attacks.

=== June ===
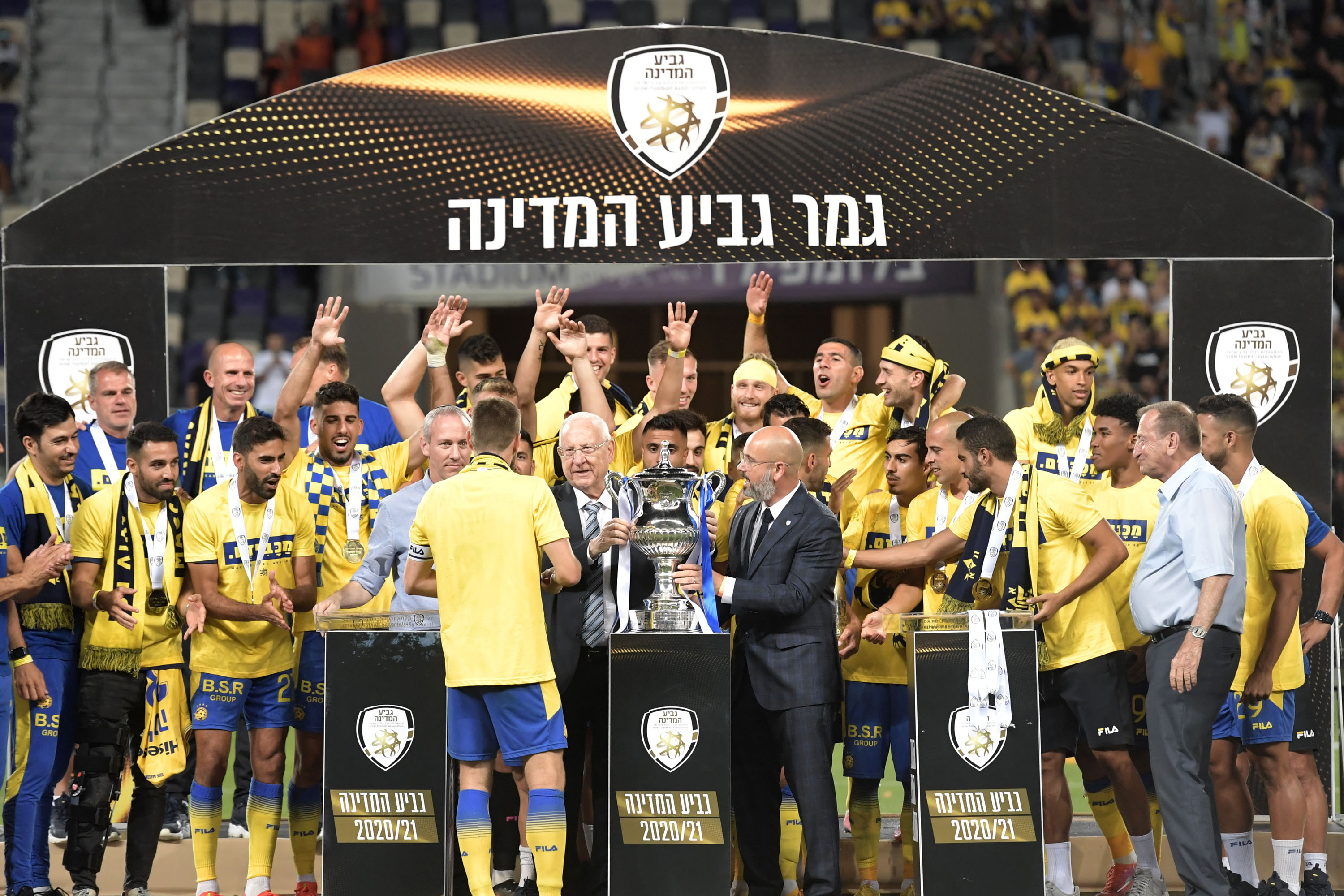
2 June: Reuven Rivlin awards the 2020–21 Israel State Cup to Maccabi Tel Aviv

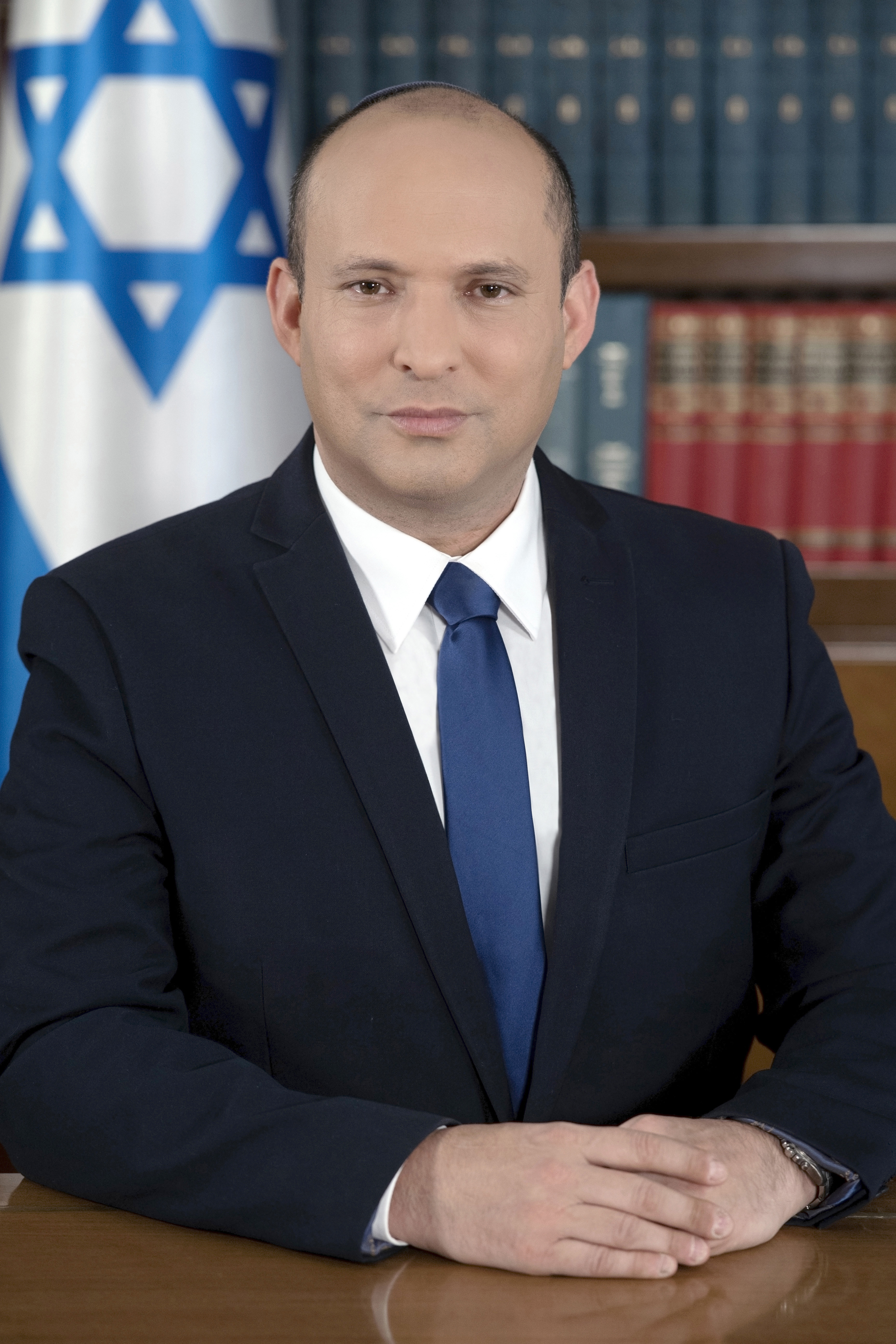
13 June: Naftali Bennett becomes the 13th Prime Minister of Israel.

- 1 June –
  - Mossad chief David Barnea takes office and replaces Yossi Cohen.
  - Isaac Herzog is elected by the Knesset as the eleventh President of the State of Israel, to assume office on 9 July.
- 2 June –
  - Yair Lapid, leader of the Yesh Atid and opposition, informs outgoing President Reuven Rivlin that he and Yamina leader Naftali Bennett have reached a deal to form a coalition government, which will remove Prime Minister Benjamin Netanyahu from power.
  - Mansour Abbas, leader of the United Arab List party, agrees to join the coalition. This is the first time in Israel's history that an Arab party will be part of the ruling government.
  - Maccabi Tel Aviv defeats Hapoel Tel Aviv 2–1 to win the 2020–21 Israel State Cup in Association football at Bloomfield Stadium in Tel Aviv.
- 3 June –
  - Pope Francis appoints Archbishop Tito Yllana as the new Apostolic Nuncio in Israel and Cyprus, and Apostolic Delegate in Jerusalem and Palestine.
  - A Likud source says that incumbent Prime Minister Benjamin Netanyahu will leave office on June 9, the day Naftali Bennett is scheduled to be sworn in.
- 4 June –
  - Pro-Palestine protesters in the U.S. gather at the Port of Oakland to attempt to block an Israeli cargo ship from entering the port. Protesters also call for an economic boycott of Israel following the 11-day conflict.
  - At least 23 runners in East Jerusalem are injured after Israeli police fired tear gas and stun grenades at people participating in a 3.5 km (2.2 mi)-run organized to show solidarity with Palestinian families facing eviction in Sheikh Jarrah.
- 6 June –
  - A vaccination campaign for 600,000 children between the ages of 12 and 16 begins, with the first priority being children who are at greater risk of experiencing severe symptoms from COVID-19 and children from families who are expected to travel abroad.
  - Israeli police arrest Sheikh Jarrah activists Muna and Mohammed El-Kurd, the former for allegedly participating in riots, and the latter after he turned himself in following a police summons. Both of them were released separately.
- 7 June –
  - A pro-settler march that was scheduled for Thursday and would have traveled through sensitive sites in East Jerusalem is canceled after Israeli police refused to authorize it. However, the police said they would review a petition calling for the march to be rescheduled. The cancellation follows a warning from Hamas senior leader Khalil al-Hayya that the march could lead to renewed violence.
  - Attorney General of Israel Avichai Mandelblit tells the Supreme Court he will not intervene in the Sheikh Jarrah case.
- 10 June – Three Palestinians killed and one injured in an IDF raid on a West Bank residence to arrest two Palestinians suspected of perpetrating a recent shooting attack with one of the suspects shot dead. Palestinian security officers arrive and reportedly open fire on the Israeli soldiers, with two of the Palestinian officers killed and a third is wounded.
- 12 June – Protesters in London gather at Downing Street to call for G7 leaders to end their support for Israel ahead of the G7 summit.
- 13 June –
  - The thirty-sixth government of Israel is sworn in at the Knesset, with Naftali Bennett as the initial Prime Minister of a coalition of right-wing, left-wing, centrist and Islamist parties, ending two years of political deadlock.
  - Israel's parliament votes in favour of a new coalition government, ending Benjamin Netanyahu's 12-year tenure as Prime Minister. He has now been replaced by Naftali Bennett.
- 15 June –
  - The Health Ministry repeals the requirement for vaccinated adults in Israel to wear masks in most circumstances, as case numbers of COVID-19 fall to their lowest numbers since the start of the national vaccination campaign in December.
  - Seventeen Palestinians are arrested and 33 more are injured after Israeli police fire tear gas and rubber bullets at Palestinians protesting at the Damascus Gate over the procession of a march called Dance of Flags through Jerusalem's Old City.
- 16 June –
  - The Israel Defense Forces carry out airstrikes on Khan Yunis and Gaza City in the Gaza Strip in the early morning, in response to incendiary balloons being flown from Gaza, putting the ceasefire in jeopardy. This comes after the Dance of Flags march was held in East Jerusalem.
  - Mediators renew their push for another ceasefire between Israel and Hamas following the airstrikes.
- 17 June –
  - Further Israeli airstrikes are conducted at sites near Beit Lahia and Gaza City targeting militias and a civil administration building in Jabalia and an agriculture field near Khan Yunis. Hamas claims on Al-Aqsa TV that it downed an Israeli drone. No casualties were reported.
  - An Israeli police officer is charged with "reckless homicide" for killing Eyad al-Hallaq, an autistic Palestinian man in Jerusalem's Old City in May 2020.
- 18 June –
  - The Palestinian Authority cancels a planned vaccine exchange with Israel involving at least one million doses of the Pfizer vaccine, saying the first batch of doses Israel was going to send were near expiration. The swap was previously announced earlier in the day.
  - At least 17 Palestinians are injured and 10 arrested after Israeli police stormed Al-Aqsa Mosque to break up a rally held in response to videos of far-right marchers insulting the Islamic prophet Muhammad during the Dance of Flags on Tuesday. A further 47 are injured when the IDF fired tear gas and rubber bullets at demonstrators near Beita in the occupied West Bank protesting the recent establishment of a military outpost near the town.
- 20 June –
  - Diplomats meet in Vienna to negotiate and restore the Joint Comprehensive Plan of Action, an agreement signed in 2015. Israeli Prime Minister Naftali Bennett warns against rejoining the deal and calls for allies to "wake up" to the threat of Iran.
  - Germany bans the flag of Hamas after it was used during protests over the 2021 Israel–Palestine crisis.
- 23 June – Israel votes against the United Nations resolution on ending the embargo on Cuba, along with the United States on 184-2 votes.
- 24 June – During a state visit to Israel, Honduran President Juan Orlando Hernández opens his country's embassy to Israel in Jerusalem, the fourth country in recent years to do so.
- 25 June – Health authorities reintroduce the requirement to wear face masks in all closed spaces as the number of COVID-19 cases rise again, primarily among unvaccinated children with the spread of the highly contagious Delta variant of the COVID-19 virus.
- 27 June
  - The government appoints a three-member commission led by former chief justice Miriam Naor to investigate the disaster at Mount Meron in April, which left 45 people dead and over 150 wounded.
  - Members of the IDF National Rescue Unit arrive in Surfside, Florida, to assist with rescue efforts at a condominium collapse site and ultimately recover 81 of the 97 victims.
- 29 June – Israel Foreign Minister Yair Lapid visits the United Arab Emirates, making it the first visit to the country by an Israel government official since the two countries normalized relations nine months ago.

=== July ===
- 3 July –
  - An Israeli cargo vessel travelling towards the United Arab Emirates in the northern Indian Ocean is struck by an "unknown weapon" and damaged. Iran is suspected as responsible.
  - In response to arson balloons launched from the Gaza Strip into Israel, the Israeli Air Force launches airstrikes on Hamas military targets in Gaza.

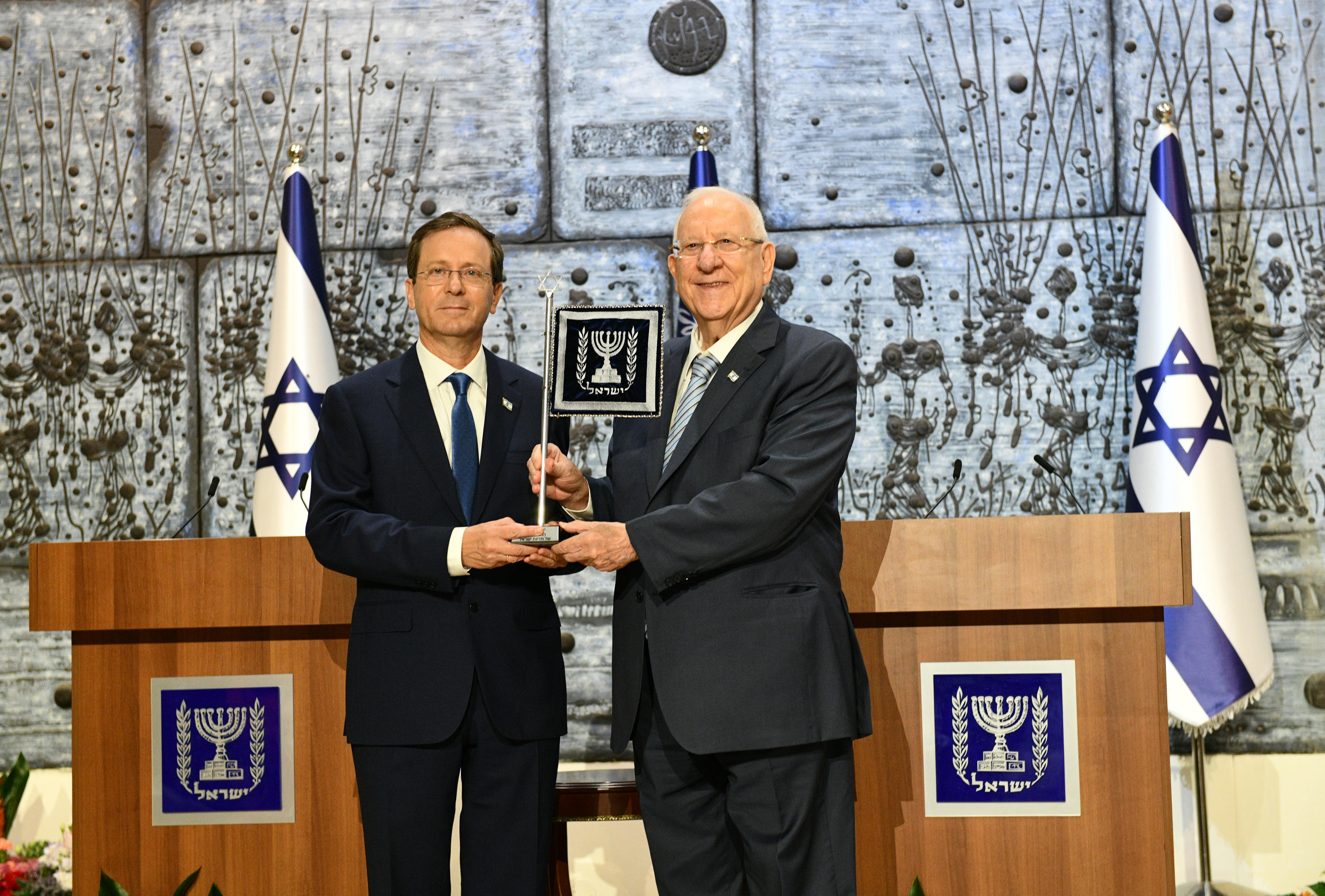
7 July: The outgoing President of Israel, Reuven Rivlin, receives the incoming president, Isaac Herzog, at Beit HaNassi in Jerusalem.

- 4 July – Prime Minister Naftali Bennett announces that around 100,000 teenagers have received a dose of the COVID-19 vaccine and that he has spoken with Pfizer CEO Albert Bourla about swapping doses of the Pfizer COVID-19 vaccine to other countries.
- 6 July – The Israeli Ministry of Foreign Affairs condemns comments made by Belarusian President Alexander Lukashenko after he said that the "whole world bows" to the Jews, "due to the Holocaust", during a speech given on Independence Day. Israel's government says that Lukashenko's comments were "unacceptable" and has summoned the interim supervisor at the Belarusian embassy.
- 7 July – Isaac Herzog takes office as the eleventh President of Israel.
- 8 July – Israel reports its first case of the SARS-CoV-2 Delta variant in a vaccinated woman who returned to the country from abroad.
- 9 July –
  - More than 370 Palestinians are injured after Israeli security forces opened fire on demonstrators protesting the presence of an illegal outpost near Beita in the occupied West Bank. Thirty-one of those injured were hit with live ammunition. Dozens more are injured in similar confrontations in Kafr Qaddum, Beit Dajan, and Hebron, with demonstrators in Hebron protesting the presence of settlements in the Masafer Yatta area.
  - The Israeli Ministry of Health announces that all visitors who are traveling to Israel, including vaccinated individuals, will be required to quarantine for 24 hours or receive a negative COVID-19 test beginning on July 16.
- 11 July –
  - The High Court rules that a provision of the Surrogacy Law, which prevents single men and same-sex couples from entering into a surrogacy arrangement must be amended to remove the restriction.
  - The Ministry of Health announces that Israel will resume administering first doses of the Pfizer COVID-19 vaccine.
  - Israeli Prime Minister Naftali Bennett announces that a deal has been reached with Pfizer CEO Albert Bourla, which would see a new shipment of vaccines delivered on August 1.
- 12 July – Israel becomes the first country in the world to offer a booster shot of the COVID-19 vaccine for immunocompromised adults. The decision comes as the Lineage B.1.617 Delta variant continues to spread in the country.
- 14 July – The United Arab Emirates opens its embassy in Israel, marking another milestone in the diplomatic relations between the two countries since signing a normalization agreement. The opening ceremony is attended by Israeli President Isaac Herzog, UAE Minister for Food and Water Security Mariam Almheiri, and UAE Ambassador to Israel Mohamed Al Khaja.
- 15 July – Israeli football club Beitar Jerusalem F.C. cancels a planned match with FC Barcelona after the latter refused to hold the match in Jerusalem, following a complaint sent by the Palestinian Football Association earlier this month. The planned location of the match would have been in Malha, which was a Palestinian Arab village prior to the establishment of Israel.
- 16 July – The Ministry of Health announces that all travel to Spain and Kyrgyzstan will be banned amid an increase in the number of COVID-19 cases. The order will be in effect on July 23.
- 18 July – A scandal uncovered by media organizations revealed that the Pegasus spyware sold by the Israeli firm NSO to several countries was used to spy on activists, journalists, lawyers and politicians.
- 23 July to 8 August – 90 athletes in 15 sports represent Israel at the 2020 Summer Olympics in Tokyo, in Israel's largest-ever Olympic delegation to date.
  - 23 July – For the first time since 11 Israeli athletes and a West German police officer were murdered during the Munich Olympics in 1972 by the Palestinian terrorist group Black September, a moment of silence is held during the opening ceremony of the Olympic Games.
  - 24 July – Avishag Semberg wins the bronze medal in Taekwondo, Israel's first medal of the 2020 Summer Olympics.
  - 31 July – The Israel national judo team wins the bronze medal in the Mixed-team Judo event.
  - 1 August – Artem Dolgopyat wins the gold medal in artistic gymnastics, Israel's third medal of the 2020 Summer Olympics and second-ever Olympic gold.
  - 7 August – Linoy Ashram wins the gold medal in rhythmic gymnastics, and becomes the first Israeli woman athlete to win gold at the Olympics.
- 19 July – American ice cream company Ben & Jerry's announces that they will stop selling their products in areas of the Palestinian territories that are controlled by Israel, saying that continuing to do this is "inconsistent with our values". In the same statement, the company said that they will continue to sell within Israel proper. The Boycott, Divestment and Sanctions movement applaud the decision, while Prime Minister Naftali Bennett and Minister for Foreign Affairs Yair Lapid harshly criticize it.
- 20 July – The IDF bombs southern Lebanon after rockets are fired into Israeli territory from these locations. Israeli Prime Minister Naftali Bennett justifies the air strike by stating that "anyone who tries to harm us will pay a painful price in return".
- 29 July – Israeli Prime Minister Naftali Bennett announces that a booster shot will be offered for people aged 60, making Israel the first country to do so.
- 31 July –
  - A Romanian captain and a British bodyguard are killed in an attack in the Gulf of Oman, when a suicide drone attacked a Liberian-flagged Japanese-owned oil tanker, belonging to an Israeli company, near the coast of Oman.
  - Israel begins the world's first third-dose vaccination campaign for people over 60 years old, with president Isaac Herzog and his wife Michal receiving a third dose of the Pfizer–BioNTech COVID-19 vaccine.

=== August ===
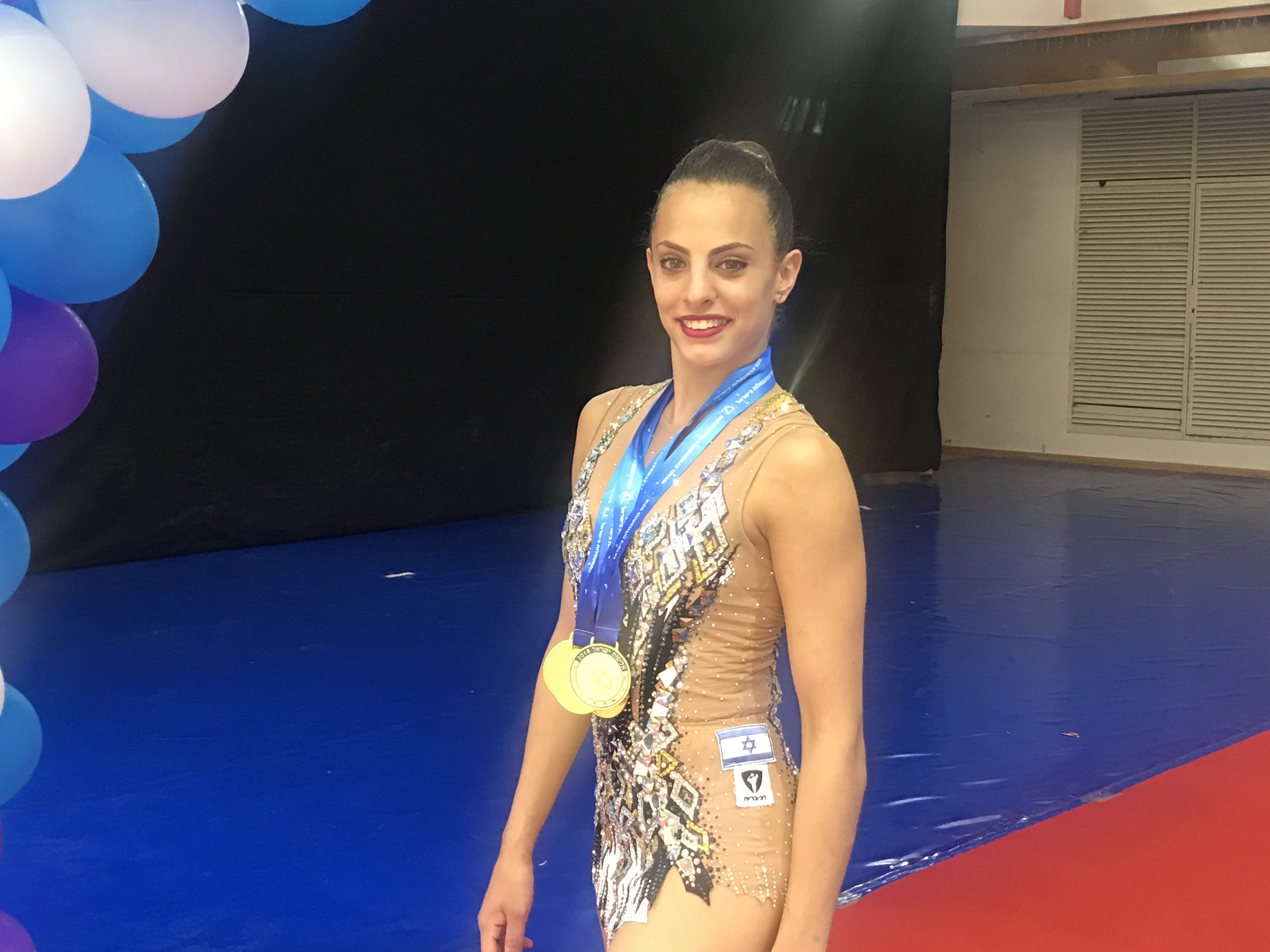
7 August: Linoy Ashram is the first woman to win a gold medal for Israel at the Olympics

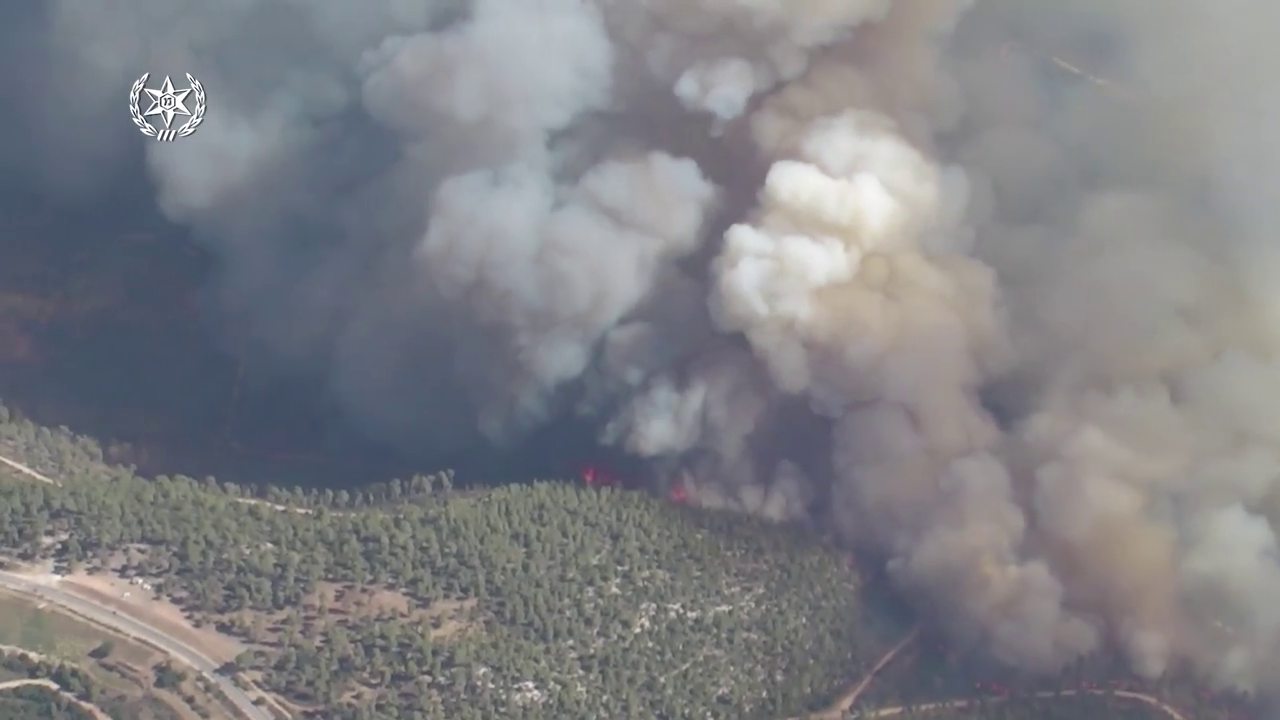
15-17 August: Wildfires in the Judean hills around Jerusalem consume thousands of acres of forest and endanger towns and villages

- 1 August –
  - The United Kingdom and the United States join Israel in blaming Iran for the Gulf of Oman incident on July 29. British Foreign Secretary Dominic Raab says that the UK and its allies are planning a coordinated response. However, an Iranian Foreign Ministry spokesperson says the allegation is "baseless."
  - COVID-19 pandemic in Israel: Israel begins giving a third dose of the vaccine against COVID-19 to people above 60 in light of an outbreak of the Delta variant of the virus.
- 4 August – Three rockets are fired from Lebanon at northern Israel, starting wildfires near Kiryat Shmona; the Israel Defense Forces responds with artillery and airstrikes.
- 6 August –
  - Hezbollah fires twenty rockets at northern Israel from Lebanon, its heaviest barrage since the 2006 war and the second firing of rockets in the past week. The Israel Defense Forces respond with artillery attacks.
  - Lebanese Druze villagers confront the Hezbollah rocket-launch convoy after it fires at Israel, accusing the militant group of endangering them by firing projectiles near civilian houses. The Lebanese Army later confiscates the launcher and arrests four suspects.
- 8 August – Restrictions renewed by the government come into effect to slow the spread of the Delta variant of the COVID-19 virus and include expanding proof of vaccine and mask-wearing requirements for some gatherings, and a shift back to more remote work, quarantines, and travel restrictions.
- 12 August COVID-19 pandemic in Israel: Israel begins giving a third dose of the vaccine against COVID-19 to people above 50.
- 13 August –
  - Israeli security forces launch stun grenades to disperse a crowd of worshippers who were praying outside the Cave of the Patriarchs in the occupied West Bank.
  - Israel lowers the minimum eligibility age for "booster" COVID-19 vaccine doses from 60 to 50 years old and expands the booster vaccine campaign to healthcare workers, prisoners, prison wardens and some high-risk patients under the age of 50 as part of an effort to protect the population from the highly-transmissible SARS-CoV-2 Delta variant.
  - Germany reclassifies Israel as "high risk" COVID-19 areas, triggering mandatory 10-day quarantines for unvaccinated travellers.
- 14 August – Israel issues a strong protest and downgrades its diplomatic representation to Poland following the enactment in Poland of a law that establishes a 30-year limit on administrative challenges to private property claims and effectively prevents restitution to heirs of property stolen by the Nazis in the Holocaust.
- 15–17 August – Wildfires rage in the outskirts of Jerusalem, burning some 6,200 acres of forest in three days.
- 16 August –
  - Four Palestinians are killed and another is seriously injured after an undercover branch of the Israel Border Police raided a refugee camp in Jenin in the occupied West Bank. The raid, which was organized to arrest a suspected Hamas member, resulted in the highest death toll in the area in months.
  - The number of people over the age of 50 who have received a booster COVID-19 vaccine dose in Israel reaches one million.
- 17 August –
  - Reichman University, formerly IDC Herzliya, is recognized by the Council for Higher Education in Israel as the first private university in Israel.
  - Israel reports 8,716 new cases of COVID-19 in the past 24 hours, which is the highest single-day total of new cases since February 1.
- 18 August – Israel begins to require people over the age of 3 to show their vaccination certificate, proof of a negative test result to enter indoor places other than shopping malls and department stores. Additionally, crowd size restrictions at events and venues limited to one person per 7 square metres (75 sq ft).
- 20 August – Prime Minister Naftali Bennett receives his third "booster" dose of the Pfizer–BioNTech COVID-19 vaccine as Israel expands its booster dose campaign eligibility to people over the age of 40.
- 22 August –
  - Dani Dayan is appointed the new chairman of the Yad Vashem Holocaust memorial museum, succeeding Avner Shalev who had retired after 27 years as the head of the institution.
  - Israel launches antibody COVID-19 testing for 1.4 million children between the ages of 3 and 12 as part of a study to measure the extent to which COVID-19 spread undetected among children in the past 18 months.
- 24 August to 5 September – 33 athletes competing in 11 sports represent Israel at the 2020 Summer Paralympics in Tokyo, Japan.
  - 24 August –
  - Iyad Shalabi wins the gold medal for the men's 100-meter backstroke in swimming and becomes the first Arab Israeli to win gold for Israel at the Paralympics.
  - 27 August – Mark Malyar wins the gold medal for the men's 200-meter individual medley and sets a new world record.
  - 28 August – Ami Omer Dadaon wins the silver medal for swimming in the men's 150 m individual medley SM4.
  - 29 August – Mark Malyar wins his second gold medal for swimming in the men's 400 m freestyle S7.
  - 29 August –
  - Moran Samuel wins the silver medal for rowing in the women's single sculls.
  - Israel expands booster dose eligibility to all people over the age of 12 who received their second dose of the COVID-19 vaccine at least five months ago.
  - 30 August – Ami Omer Dadaon wins his second medal, the gold medal for swimming in the men's 200 m freestyle S4.
  - 30 August – Mark Malyar wins his third medal, the bronze medal for swimming in the men's 100 m backstroke S7.
  - 2 September – Iyad Shalabi wins his second gold medal for swimming in the men's 50 metre backstroke S1.
  - 2 September – Ami Omer Dadaon wins his second gold medal and third medal overall for swimming in the men's 50 m freestyle S4.
- 24 August – Israel surpasses one million cases of COVID-19.
- 26 August – The Israeli Supreme Court rejects a claim by Moroccan immigrants to Israel that they be recognized as Holocaust victims who suffered under the Vichy race laws in Morocco during World War II and be granted state compensation payments, on the grounds that Moroccan authorities acted against Jews on their own accord, without being forced to do so by Nazi Germany.
- 27 August – Prime Minister Naftali Bennett and US President Joe Biden meet for the first time at the White House, with the Iranian nuclear threat top of their agenda.
- 30 August – The first ambassador of Bahrain to Israel, Khaled Yousif al-Jalahma, arrives in Israel following the 2020 agreement between the countries to establish diplomatic relations as part of the Abraham Accords.

=== September ===
- 6 September –
  - Six Palestinian prisoners, five from Islamic Jihad and one from Fatah, escape from the Gilboa prison in northern Israel; all are recaptured within two weeks.
  - The sabbatical year, when most farmland in Israel is left to lie fallow in accordance with Jewish law, begins with the celebration of Rosh Hashanah for the Hebrew calendar year 5782.
  - Over 2.4 million children in Israel return to school on the start of the new academic year with mandatory masks and COVID-19 testing aimed at reducing an increase in the number of COVID-19 cases in the highly vaccinated country primarily caused by the highly transmissible Delta variant.
  - The head of Israel's Biological Institute, Professor Shmuel Shapira, reveals that midway through vaccine development, its office was requested by the government of then-Prime Minister Benjamin Netanyahu to suspend development of a locally developed vaccine.
- 2 September – Israeli soldiers open fire on Palestinians protesting against Israel's 14-year blockade of the Gaza Strip, killing one and injuring 15 others.
- 12 September – An apartment building in Holon collapses, destroying the homes of 36 families but without any casualties, the building having been evacuated the previous day.
- 14 September – The inaugural season of the UEFA Europa Conference League, the third tier of European club football, begins with Maccabi Tel Aviv winning 4–1 against Armenian club FC Alashkert.
- 19 September – Israel Defense Forces announces that all six Palestinian fugitives that escaped from Gilboa Prison on September 6, have been recaptured, after the last two, who are part of the Islamic Jihad Movement, were arrested in the Palestinian city of Jenin through a joint operation with the Yamam.
- 24 September –
  - Israeli soldiers open fire using rubber bullets against Palestinians allegedly throwing rocks towards soldiers during a protest against Israeli settlements in the West Bank, killing Mohammed Ali Khabisa, 27, and injuring eight others.
  - At a conference in Erbil, Iraqi Kurdistan, over 300 tribal leaders and participants call on the Iraqi government to end the state of war with Israel and normalize ties by joining the Abraham Accords.
- 25 September –
  - Five members of Hamas are killed in Biddu, Jerusalem, and two more are killed in Burqin the West Bank during an Israeli operation to arrest operatives suspected of planning a series of terrorist attacks in Israel. Two soldiers were injured in one raid.
  - Palestinian Legislative Council member Khalida Jarrar is released from Israeli prison after nearly two years in detention. She was charged for her affiliation with the left-wing political party Popular Front for the Liberation of Palestine, which is considered an illegal organization in Israel.
- 27 September – Prime Minister Naftali Bennet delivers his first speech to the United Nations General Assembly and addresses the COVID-19 pandemic and threats posed by Iran, but does not mention the Israeli-Palestinian conflict.
- 30 September –
  - Three Palestinians are killed, two are injured and two more are arrested by Israeli soldiers during armed confrontations in the West Bank.
  - Israeli Foreign Minister Yair Lapid travels to Bahrain for the first official visit by an Israeli cabinet member to the Gulf kingdom since the countries established diplomatic ties last year.

=== October ===
- 3 October – Israel introduces a new rule that requires booster dose of the COVID-19 vaccine to be considered fully vaccinated for everyone aged 12 and older in "Green Pass", becoming the first country to do so.
- 4 October –
  - Prime Minister Bennett reveals that Mossad kidnapped an Iranian general in Syria to uncover information on the whereabouts of missing pilot Ron Arad.
  - Police in Cyprus arrest a suspect believed to be "planning attacks against Israeli people". Israel has accused Iran of orchestrating the plot, although Iran has denied the allegations. Other reports suggest that the target of the plot was businessman Teddy Sagi and could be linked to business disputes involving Sagi.
- 6 October – During a state visit to Ukraine, Israeli President Isaac Herzog, Ukrainian President Volodymyr Zelenskyy, and German President Frank-Walter Steinmeier attend the inauguration of a memorial to victims of Babyn Yar on the 80th anniversary of the Nazi massacre of 33,000 Jews in a ravine near Kiev in September 1941.
- 7 October – The Israeli pavilion at Expo 2020 in Dubai is opened by Minister of Tourism Yoel Razvozov in the presence of Israeli and Emirati dignitaries and guests.
- 10 October – On her eighth and final visit to Israel as Chancellor of Germany, Angela Merkel visits Yad Vashem, meets with government officials and reaffirms that Germany will preserve a post-Holocaust commitment to Israel's security.
- 14 October – Ronen Bar becomes the new director of the Shin Bet.
- 18 October – Swedish Minister of Foreign Affairs Ann Linde visits Israel, ending a 7-year diplomatic freeze after Sweden officially recognized a Palestinian state in 2014.
- 19 October – Israel reports its first case of the Delta subvariant "AY4.2" in a boy who travelled from Moldova.
- 20 October – The United Arab Emirates and Israel announce plans for a joint space exploration deal that will include a second moon-shot of Israel's Beresheet craft in 2024.
- 22 October –
  - Prime Minister Naftali Bennett and Russian President Vladimir Putin hold their first official meeting in Sochi, Russia, to discuss bilateral trade relations, coordination regarding the Russian presence in Syria, and the regional and nuclear threats posed by Iran.
  - Defense Minister Benny Gantz designates six Palestinian NGOs as terrorist organizations, on the grounds that they act on behalf of the Popular Front for the Liberation of Palestine.
  - The Israeli Defense Ministry designates six Palestinian groups, including human rights organization Al-Haq and non-profit organization Union of Agricultural Work Committees, as "terrorist organisations" for their alleged connections to the Popular Front for the Liberation of Palestine. The Palestinian National Authority, the Office of the United Nations High Commissioner for Human Rights, and several human rights groups harshly criticize the designations.

=== November ===
- 1 November –
  - Prime Minister Naftali Bennet leads a delegation of over a hundred, including the Minister of Energy, Karine Elharrar and the Minister of Environmental Protection, Tamar Zandberg, to the United Nations Climate Change Conference (COP26), where he commits Israel to phasing out coal for energy generation by 2025, and reaching net zero for greenhouse gas emissions by 2050, and announces that the government has set up a task-force to provide funds and reduce bureaucracy to encourage the Israeli hi-tech sector to develop solutions to combat climate change.
  - Israel reopens its borders to vaccinated international travellers for the first time since March 2020, where they must have received two doses of any WHO-approved vaccine, a booster dose within the past six months, or only one dose if they have recovered from COVID-19.
- 3 November – The U.S. Commerce Department adds Israeli spyware firms Candiru and NSO Group to its trade blacklist for selling their services and tools to foreign governments to spy on government officials and journalists, and for trafficking tools used to hack computer networks respectively.
- 5 November – After a marathon and often acrimonious session, the Knesset passes the 2021 and 2022 state budgets, the country's first approved national budgets in three and half years, and avoids triggering another round of early elections as a result.
- 8 November – During a high-level state visit to Israel, Colombian Defense Minister Diego Molano declares Iran to be an enemy of Colombia despite both nations continuing to maintain diplomatic relations.
- 10 November – Israel's pandemic advisory board approves the usage of the Pfizer-BioNTech COVID-19 vaccine for children between the ages of 5 and 11 years old.
- 11 November – Israel begins the world's first nationwide COVID-19 drill named "Omega Drill" consisting of three sessions that will test the country's preparation for the possible outbreak of a new and more lethal variant of the virus.
- 14 November – The Israeli Health ministry approves the usage of the Pfizer–BioNTech COVID-19 vaccine for children aged 5 to 11, two weeks after the U.S. FDA grants its own approval, with vaccination expected to begin next week.
- 19 November – The United Kingdom outlaws Hamas, the Palestinian militant group which serves as the ruling party of the Gaza Strip, and declares the party as a terrorist group. Previously, only the party's armed wing was outlawed.
- 21 November – A Hamas terrorist opens fire in the Old City of Jerusalem, killing an Israeli man and wounding four others, before being shot and killed by Israeli police officers.
- 22 November –
  - Jordan and Israel sign an agreement at the Dubai Expo brokered by the United Arab Emirates by which a UAE company will build a solar power plant in Jordan from which Israel will buy electricity in exchange for water from an Israeli desalination plant.
  - Israel begins administering the Pfizer–BioNTech COVID-19 vaccine for children between the ages of 5 and 11 years.
- 23 November –
  - The COVID-19 vaccination campaign for children aged 5–11 begins, seeking to curtail the spread of COVID-19 in schools and close the main remaining gap in the country's push for national immunity from the pandemic.
  - At an archaeological dig at the Jerusalem Walls National Park, an 11-year-old girl finds a rare 2,000-year-old silver shekel coin, engraved with "second year," referring to the second year of the Great Jewish Revolt against the Romans (66–73 CE).
- 24 November –
  - Israel carries out airstrikes in Homs, Syria, killing two civilians and injuring six soldiers and another civilian.
  - In Rabat, Morocco, Minister of Defense Benny Gantz and his Moroccan counterpart, Abdellatif Loudiyi, sign a memorandum of understanding on defense between Israel and Morocco, the first such agreement between Israel and an Arab state formalizing defense ties and cooperation.
- 25 November – Israel announces a ban on travellers from South Africa, Lesotho, Botswana, Zimbabwe, Mozambique, Namibia and Eswatini entering and advising against tourists visiting the named countries to curb the spread of the new Omicron/B.1.1.529 variant of Covid-19.
- 26 November – Israel reports its first case of the Omicron variant in a person who travelled from Malawi.
- 28 November – Israel closes its borders to all foreigners and requires citizens who have travelled outside the country to quarantine for three days for fully vaccinated people and seven days for unvaccinated people as part of an effort to reduce the spread of the Omicron variant.
- 29 November –
  - Miss Universe France 2021, Clémence Botino, a contestant at the Miss Universe contest in Eilat, Israel, tests positive for COVID-19.
  - Turkish President Recep Tayyip Erdoğan reveals his intentions to rebuild his country's ties with Egypt and Israel.

=== December ===
- 6 December – Israel signs the Horizon Europe agreement with the EU despite the exclusion of Israeli settlements.
- 7 December –
  - Israel finishes building a 65-kilometer underground barrier in its border with Gaza to deal with the threat of cross-border tunnels.
  - Israeli Air Force warplanes bomb the Port of Latakia, Syria's main seaport with at least five explosions reported, with a Syrian military official stating that several missiles struck the container area of the port. It is the first Israeli attack on the facility through which Iran and Hezbollah import weapons into Syria.
- 10 December – A man is killed and others are wounded as Israeli soldiers open fire on a group of Palestinian people protesting against Israeli settlements in the occupied West Bank.
- 11 December – Israeli Defense Minister Benny Gantz says he has instructed the Israel Defense Forces to prepare military options for potential use against Iran, that the Joint Comprehensive Plan of Action yielded "no progress", and that world powers "understand that the Iranians are playing games".
- 12 December –
  - The Miss Universe 2021 pageant takes place in Eilat where Miss India, Harnaaz Sandhu, is crowned Miss Universe; Israel is represented by Noa Cochva.
  - Archeologists announce the discovery of a 2,000-year-old synagogue from the Second Temple period in the town of Migdal, in the Galilee region.
- 13 December –
  - Prime Minister Naftali Bennett and Sheikh Mohamed bin Zayed Al Nahyan of the United Arab Emirates discuss strengthening bilateral trade and cooperation in multiple areas, at the first meeting of the leaders of the two countries.
  - Israeli Prime Minister Naftali Bennett and Sheikh Mohamed bin Zayed Al Nahyan of the United Arab Emirates discuss strengthening bilateral trade and cooperation in multiple areas, at the first meeting of the leaders of the two countries.
  - Harnaaz Sandhu of India is crowned Miss Universe in Eilat, Israel.
- 14 December – Researchers from Tel Aviv University, Sheba Medical Center and from institutes in Europe and the United States announce that they have uncovered a mechanism that may unlock a way to delay or reverse the causes of the neurodegenerative disease ALS, for which there is currently no treatment.
- 16 December –
  - Israeli warplanes launch overnight airstrikes in southern Syria, with missiles originating from the Golan Heights, killing a soldier and causing some material damage, according to a Syrian military official. Syrian air defences engaged the Israeli missiles, with most missiles reportedly intercepted.
  - An Israeli man is killed, and two others are injured, in a shooting near Homesh in the northern West Bank by gunmen suspected to belong to the Palestinian Islamic Jihad terror group.
- 17 December –
  - Israeli settlers burst into several villages in the occupied West Bank, beating and injuring at least two people.
  - Anastasia Gorbenko wins the first gold medal for Israel at the World Swimming Championships for the 50-meter breaststroke, followed by a second gold medal in the 100-meter individual medley two days later.
- 18 December – Ukrainian ambassador to Israel Yevhen Korniychuk says that Ukraine might recognize Jerusalem as the capital of Israel.
- 20 December –
  - Israeli Defense Forces report that they have arrested more than 100 members of the Palestinian Islamist organization Hamas, amid a recent increase in tensions.
  - The Carmel storm hits Israel with heavy rainfall and strong winds.
  - The Israeli government announces a ban on all travel to Germany, Italy, Belgium, Hungary, Morocco, Portugal, Canada, Switzerland, Turkey, and the U.S. without special permission beginning on December 22 due to the spread of the SARS-CoV-2 Omicron variant.
- 21 December – The Health ministry recommends that Israelis over the age of 60 years and healthcare workers should receive a fourth dose of the COVID-19 vaccine, becoming the world's first country to administer a fourth dose of the vaccine. The move is welcomed by Prime Minister Naftali Bennett.
  - Israel reports its first confirmed death related to the SARS-CoV-2 Omicron variant in a man in his 60s with pre-existing health conditions who died at the Soroka Medical Center in Beersheba. The hospital later states that the death was actually because of the SARS-CoV-2 Delta variant.
- 22 December – The Soroka Medical Center in Beersheba clarifies that the man thought to be Israel's first Omicron death had actually had the SARS-CoV-2 Delta variant, following the final laboratory results regarding his condition.
- 24 December – After five days of military training, Iran fires sixteen ballistic missiles at a target in a show of force against Israel. The incident is part of a wider increase in tensions between the two countries.
- 25 December – The Israeli government finalizes an agreement with Pfizer to purchase 100,000 courses of the anti-viral drug Paxlovid for high-risk patients over the age of 12 years, with delivery expected to begin in one week.
- 26 December – Iran's Islamic Revolutionary Guard Corps releases a video on social media threatening to destroy the Israeli city of Dimona and a nearby nuclear facility in the Negev desert.
- 27 December –
  - The Sheba Medical Center near Tel Aviv, Israel, begins the world's first clinical trial of fourth doses of the COVID-19 vaccine, involving 150 medical personnel, in order to determine if a fourth dose can provide extra immunity against COVID-19.
  - The health ministry reduces the interval between the second dose and booster dose of the COVID-19 vaccine to three months, citing concerns about the spread of the Omicron variant.
  - An outbreak of H5N1 avian influenza in Northern Israel kills 5,200 of migratory cranes, and hundreds of thousands of domestic poultry are culled in a bid to halt the spread of the disease.
- 28 December – Syrian state media reports that Israel has bombed the Port of Latakia, the second airstrike on the facility this month. Secondary explosions are believed to be from Iranian munitions stored at the facility.
- 30 December –
  - The Israeli Health ministry approves fourth doses of the COVID-19 vaccine for immunocompromised people, becoming the first country to do so.
  - The Central Bureau of Statistics releases data showing that 9.449 million people live in Israel at the end of 2021, of whom 6.982 million (74%) are Jewish, 1.99 million (21%) are Arab and 472,000 (5%) are neither.
- 30 December – Israel extends fourth doses of the COVID-19 vaccine to elderly people in care facilities and begins administering fourth doses for vulnerable people, citing the high-risk of infection.

== Deaths ==
- 18 January – Dani Shmulevich-Rom (b. 1940), Maccabi Haifa football player (1957–1973) and Israel national football team (1960–1970).
- 24 January – Moshe Moskowitz (b. 1925), politician, head of the Shafir Regional Council (1952–1979) and Efrat town council (1980–1985).
- 31 January – Yitzchok Scheiner (b. 1922), Haredi rabbi and rosh yeshiva of the Kamenitz Yeshiva of Jerusalem.
- 31 January – Meshulam Dovid Soloveitchik (b. 1921), Haredi rabbi and rosh yeshiva of the Brisk Yeshiva in Jerusalem.
- 31 January – Abraham J. Twerski, (b. 1930), Hasidic rabbi, author, and psychiatrist specializing in substance abuse.
- 5 February – Ruth Dayan, (b. 1917), businesswoman, founder of Maskit fashion house, social activist and recipient of the President's Medal of Distinction.
- 8 February – Shlomo Hillel (b. 1923), politician and diplomat, Speaker of the Knesset (1984–1988), Minister of Police (1969–1977) and Internal Affairs (1977).
- 15 February – Gideon Meir (b. 1947), diplomat, ambassador to Italy (2006–2011).
- 18 February – Yehoshua Sagi (b. 1933), Director of the Military Intelligence Directorate (1979–1983) and member of the Knesset (1988–1992).
- 23 February – Sergiu Natra (b. 1924), classical music composer, conductor, and professor of music at Tel-Aviv University.
- 25 February – Manfred Gerstenfeld (b.1937), economist, author and scholar of antisemitism.
- 25 February – Rafi Levi (b. 1938), footballer for Maccabi Tel Aviv (1954–1966) and Israel national football team (1958–1960).
- 7 March – Mordechai Bar-On (b.1928), historian and politician, member of the Knesset (1984–1986).
- 12 March – Roei Sadan (b. 1982), adventurer and cyclist who circumnavigated the world on his bicycle.
- 4 April – Uri Gallin (b.1928), Israeli Olympic discus thrower (1952).
- 9 April – Gavriel Cohen (b. 1928), historian and politician, member of the Knesset (1965–1969).
- 13 April – Isi Leibler (b. 1934), activist, publicist, World Jewish Congress official and leader in the global campaign on behalf of Soviet Jewry.
- 28 April – Hussein Faris (b. 1935), Israeli Arab politician and member of the Knesset (1988–1992).
- 4 May – Dan Tawfik (b. 1955), biochemist at the Weizmann Institute of Science, known for contributions in protein engineering, evolutionary biochemistry and enzyme evolution, EMET Prize (2020).
- 6 May – Yitzhak Arad (b.1926), military officer and historian, director of Yad Vashem (1972–1993).
- 13 May – Bella Kaufman (b.1956), oncologist, head of department at Sheba Medical Center, and professor at Sackler Faculty of Medicine at Tel Aviv University.
- 22 May – Moti Rosenblum (b. 1946), journalist at Maariv and IDF Radio, CEO of the Israel Press and Communications Council.
- 22 May – Eddy Zemach (b.1935), philosopher, professor emeritus in the Department of Philosophy at the Hebrew University of Jerusalem.
- 25 May – David Klein (b. 1935), economist, governor of the Bank of Israel (2000–2005).
- 25 May – Eilat Mazar (b. 1956), archaeologist, specialist in Jerusalem, Phoenician and Biblical archaeology, noted for her discovery of the Large Stone Structure, surmised to be the palace of King David.
- 25 May – Amichai Shoham (b. 1922), footballer for Hapoel Petah Tikva F.C. (1941–1954) and the Israel national football team (1949–1952).
- 29 May – Dani Karavan (b. 1930), sculptor known for site specific memorials and monuments and Israel Prize winner.
- 31 May – Zakay Aharon (b. 1927), Iraqi-born poet, journalist and translator.
- 6 June – Avi Har-Even (b. 1937), engineer, head of the Israel Space Agency (1995–2004).
- 22 June – Tsevi E. Tal (b. 1927), district court judge (1978–1994), and Supreme Court justice (1994–1997), head of the Tal Committee on exemptions from military service for ultra-Orthodox Jews (1999–2000).
- 29 June – Yitzhak "Vicky" Peretz (b. 1953), national league and national team (1973–1983) football player, and team manager.
- 14 July – Yekutiel Gershoni (b. 1943), historian and runner, Paralympic silver medalist for athletics at the 1980 Summer Paralympics and 1984 Summer Paralympics.
- 15 July – Mohamed Nafa (b. 1940), Israeli Druze politician, Secretary General of the Israel Communist Party and Member of Knesset (1990–1992).
- 20 July – Ruth Pearl (b. 1935), Israeli-American software developer, mother of slain American journalist Daniel Pearl.
- 24 July – Omri Nitzan (b. 1950), artistic director of the Cameri and Habima Theaters, and the Israel Festival.
- 26 July – Roni Daniel (b. 1947), journalist specializing in military affairs.
- 26 July – Elad Peled (b. 1927), military officer, public servant and educator.
- 28 July – Tzvi Shissel (b. 1946), actor, film director and music producer.
- 2 August – Ruth Horam (b. 1931), painter and sculptor, winner of the Jerusalem Prize.
- 6 August – Aryeh Gamliel (b. 1951), Israeli rabbi and politician, member of the Knesset for the Shas Party (1988–2003).
- 9 August – Naftali Tishby (b. 1952), professor of computer science and computational neuroscientist at the Hebrew University of Jerusalem.
- 11 August – Yehoshua Zuckerman (b. 1938), Religious Zionist rabbi and teacher, specialist in the writings of Rabbi Abraham Isaac Kook.
- 12 August – Igael Tumarkin (b. 1933), painter and sculptor, winner of the Israel Prize for Sculpture in 2004.
- 12 August – Stephen Wiesner (b. 1942), research physicist in the area of quantum information theory, professor at Tel Aviv University.
- 25 August – Said al-Harumi (b. 1972), Negev Bedouin politician, member of the Knesset for the Joint List and the United Arab List (2017–2021).
- 13 September – Baruch Nachshon (b. 1939), Chabad Hasidic artist.
- 14 September – Ida Nudel (b. 1931), Soviet-born refusenik and civil rights activist on behalf of "Prisoners of Zion" in the Soviet Union.
- 20 September – Gary Eckstein (b. 1948), Israeli blues rock singer.
- 21 September – Aharon Abuhatzira (b. 1938), Israeli politician, member of Knesset (1977–1992), Minister of Religious Services (1977–1981) and Labor and Social Services (1981–1982).
- 21 September – Marcia Freedman (1938), feminist and civil rights activist, Member of Knesset (1974–1977).
- 22 September – Eric Alfasi (1972), Israeli basketball player for Maccabi Netanya and coach of Maccabi Ashdod and Hapoel Eilat.
- 26 September – Yehuda "Judd" Ne'eman (b. 1936), film director and producer, poet, and Winner of the Israel Prize (2009).
- 26 September – Herzl Shafir (b. 1929), IDF general, commissioner of Israel Police (1980).
- 5 October – Yosef Paritzky (b. 1955), member of Knesset (1999–2006) and Minister of National Infrastructures (2003–2004).
- 8 October – Nola Chilton (b. 1922), acting teacher and theater director who pioneered socially engaged theater in Israel, recipient of the Israel Prize for Theater (2013).
- 8 October – Mordechai Geldman (b. 1946), psychologist, poet, writer, artist, art critic and curator, and recipient of the Bialik Prize for lifetime achievements.
- 9 October – Yossi Maiman (b. 1946), banking executive, businessman and president (2002–2013) and CEO (2006–2013) of Ampal-American Israel Corporation.
- 14 October – Yitzhak Keinan (b. 1942), writer, songwriter and screenwriter, and mayor of Beit Shean (1974–1983).
- 15 October – Yosef Bar-Yosef (b. 1933), author and playwright, winner of the Israel Prize for Theatre (2003).
- 26 October – Nawaf Massalha (b. 1943), member of the Knesset (1988–2003), first Israeli Arab politician to hold a ministerial position, Deputy Minister of Health (1992–1996), and Deputy Minister of Foreign Affairs (1999–2001).
- 26 October – Uri Rubin (b. 1944), professor of Arabic and Islamic Studies at Tel Aviv University, contributor to the Encyclopaedia of Islam and other works.
- 29 October – Eliyahu Matza (b. 1935), judge and justice of the Supreme Court (1991–2005).
- 31 October – Avishag Zahavi (1922), botanist, professor emeritus of Plant Physiology at The Volcani Center for Agricultural Research at Beit Dagan.
- 4 November – Amatsia Levkovich (b. 1937), football player for Hapoel Tel Aviv (1955–1968), and national team (1957–1965), and professional coach (1969–1994).
- 18 November – Zvi Zilker (b. 1933), longest-serving mayor of Ashdod (1969–1983, 1989–2008).
- 24 November – Aryeh Nehemkin (1925), member of the Haganah, lieutenant colonel in the Israel Defense Forces, Secretary of the Moshavim Movement (1970–1981), member of Knesset for the Alignment (1981–1988) and Minister of Agriculture (1984–1988).
- 30 November – G. Yafit (b.1951), advertising executive and owner of the Steimatzky bookstore chain.
- 18 December – Eliezer Waldman (b. 1937), Orthodox rabbi and politician, Member of Knesset for Tehiya 1984–1990, and co-founder and head of Yeshivat Nir Kiryat Arba.
- 27 December – Yaacov Adler (b. 1950), basketball coach for Hapoel Tel Aviv and Maccabi Tel Aviv.
- 27 December – Chaim Walder (b. 1968), Haredi rabbi and author, accused rapist, suicide by gunshot.

== See also ==
- 2021 Israel–Palestine crisis
- 2018–2022 Israeli political crisis
- COVID-19 pandemic in Israel
- Israel at the 2020 Summer Olympics (held in 2021)
- Timeline of the Israeli–Palestinian conflict in 2021
