= 2021 Israel wildfires =

Forest fire in Jerusalem hills

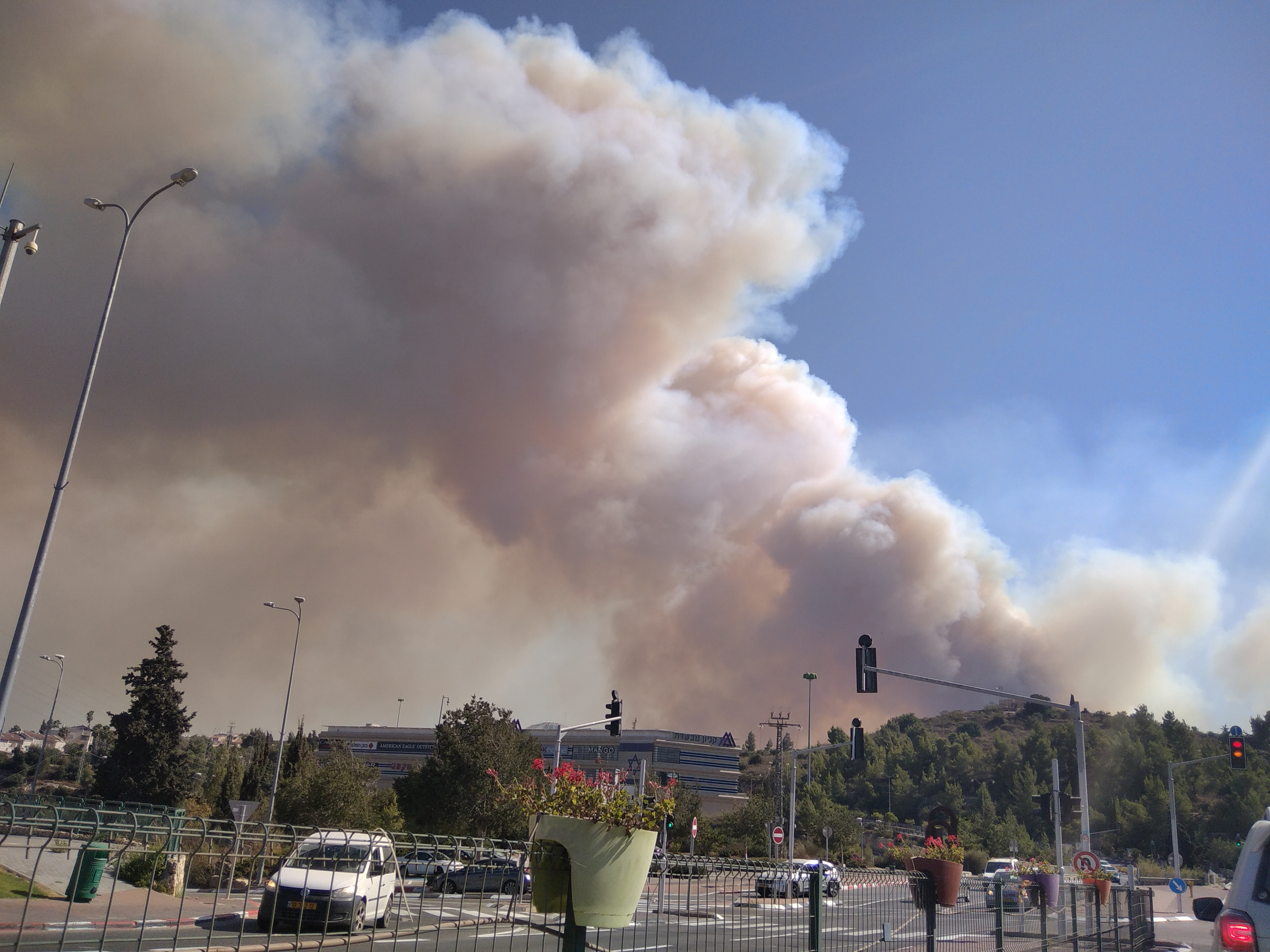
- Picture taken of one of several wildfires that burned in Israel in 2021.
- Date: 15–19 August 2021
- Location: Judaean Mountains

Statistics
- Burned area: 11,000 dunams (1100 hectares,11 km2)

Impacts
- Cost: > 750 million shekels

Ignition
- Cause: Arson, exacerbated by weather conditions

The 2021 Israel wildfires were multiple wildfires that happened in the vicinity of Jerusalem.

== Timeline ==
On 16 August 2021, a large wildfire outside Jerusalem has begun to spread again as the wind picks up, leading police to evacuate some residents of Sho'eva as the blaze nears the community. The Israeli Defense Forces dispatched several transport helicopters to assist in the evacuation of Giv'at Ye'arim due to the massive forest fire raging outside Jerusalem. Israel Fire and Rescue Services chief Dedi Simchi said that the massive forest fire outside Jerusalem was on the same scale as the 2010 Mount Carmel fire. During the night, the Fire and Rescue Services chief Didi Simchi had deployed large force to protect Jerusalen’s Hadassah Hospital.

== Reactions ==
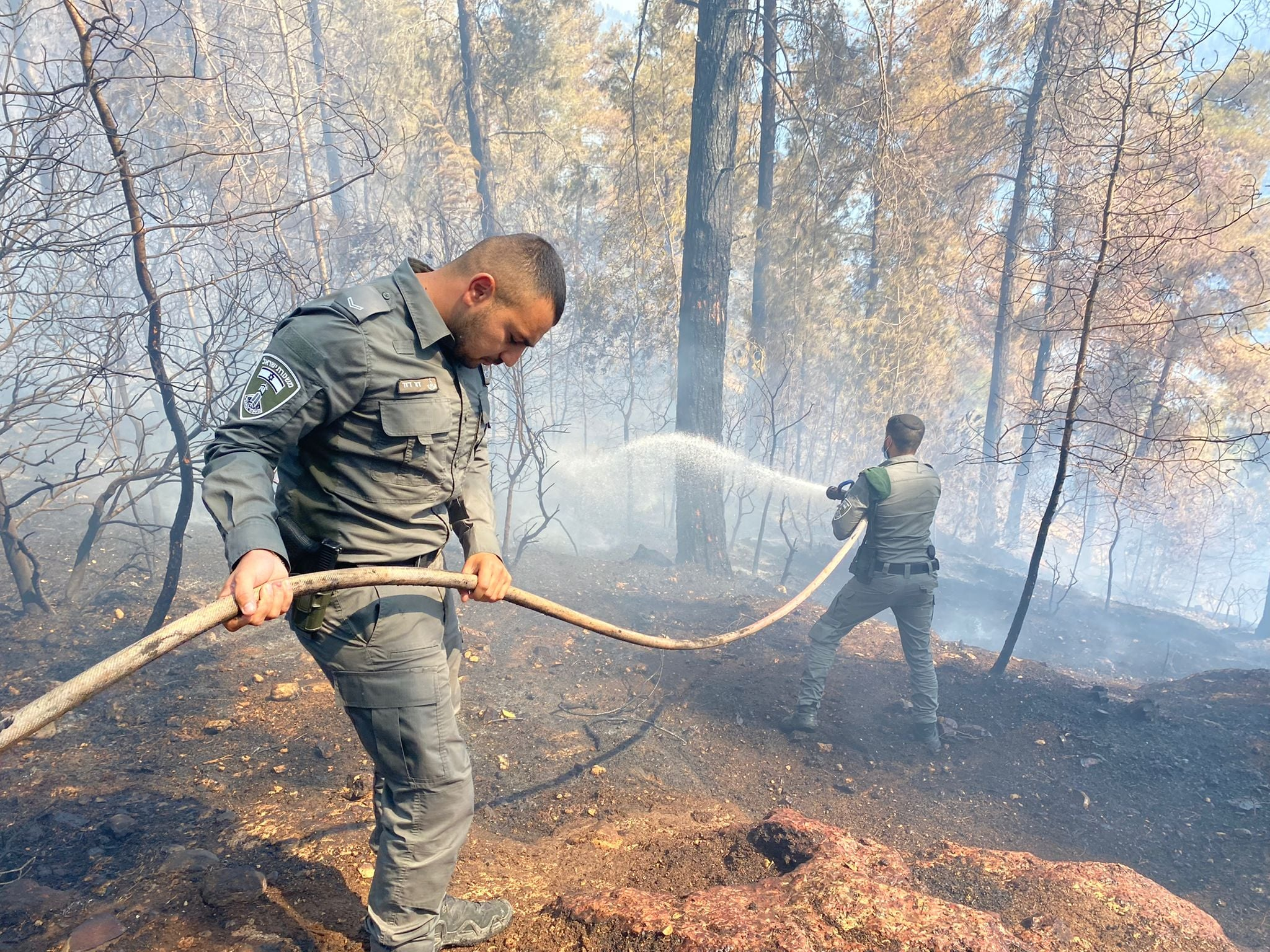
Israel Police, 16 August 2021

The Prime Minister Naftali Bennett gave the go-ahead for Israel to consider seeking international assistance to help battle a large wildfire raging outside Jerusalem.

The Foreign Ministry Yair Lapid requested assistance from Greece, Cyprus, Italy, France, and other regional countries for help in fighting a massive forest fire outside Jerusalem.

On 16 August 2021, Foreign Minister Yair Lapid spoke with his Greek counterpart, Nikos Dendias, asked him to send firefighting planes, Dendias said Greece would help as much as it can, and with his Cypriot counterpart, Nikos Christodoulides, who says Cyprus is prepared send firefighting planes to help battle a large forest fire outside Jerusalem.

== See also ==
- 2021 in Israel
- List of wildfires
- Wildfires in 2021
