= Yossi Maiman =

German-born Israeli businessman (1946–2021)

- יוסי מימן
- Born: 8 February 1946; Landsberg am Lech, Bavaria, Germany
- Died: 9 October 2021 (aged 75); Herzliya, Israel
- Education: University of Texas at El Paso; Cornell University
- Occupation: Businessman
- Children: 3
- Parent(s): Yisrael Maiman; Esfira Rapaport

Yossi Maiman (Hebrew: יוסי מימן; 8 February 1946 − 9 October 2021), also known as Josef Maiman, was a German-born Israeli businessman. He was the founder and owner of the Merhav Group, and a shareholder of the East Mediterranean Gas Company. He was a majority shareholder of Channel 10, an Israeli television channel. He was the owner, chairman, chief executive officer and president of the Ampal-American Israel Corporation.

== Early life ==
Yossi Maiman was born in a displaced persons camp in Landsberg am Lech, Bavaria, Germany. He was of Polish Jewish descent on his maternal side. His mother, Esfira Maiman, is a Holocaust survivor from Łódź; she escaped from the Warsaw Ghetto and hid in Grodzisk Mazowiecki during World War II. Her first husband was murdered by the Nazis. In 2008, the Roman Catholic woman who saved her, Stanisława Sławińska, was honored by Yad Vashem as Righteous Among the Nations. After she remarried to Maiman's father, the family moved to Peru, where Maiman grew up. They emigrated to Israel in 1972.

Maiman graduated with a bachelor's degree in economics from the University of Texas at El Paso. He earned a master of arts degree in economics from Cornell University.

== Career ==
Maiman founded the Merhav Group in 1975. He served as its president and chief executive officer. Through a subsidiary, it invests in sugarcane and ethanol production, It also owns a concession from the Egyptian government to export natural gas to Israel. Additionally, it "modernized a refinery in Turkmenistan" and "water treatment and sewage systems in Venezuela".

In June 2003, Maiman, Hussein Salem and the General Petroleum Company of Egypt formed the Eastern Mediterranean Gas (EMG) consortium. In April 2007, Maiman had a 25% stake in EMG.

Maiman acquired the Ampal-American Israel Corporation from Beny Steinmetz for US$174 million in 2002. He served as its chairman from 2002 to 2013, and as its president and chief executive officer from 2006 to 2013. According to Globes, Maiman stepped down as a result of losses incurred in the wake of the Egyptian revolution of 2011, when contracts for the distribution of gas between Egypt and Israel fell through.

Maiman invested in Channel 10, an Israeli television channel, in 2003, becoming the largest shareholder alongside Arnon Milchan, Ron Lauder and Rupert Murdoch; he divested from the channel in 2009. Additionally, Maiman served as the chairman of Eltek, a manufacturer of printed circuit boards (publicly traded on the NASDAQ as "ELTK"), and the Israeli chemical company Gadot Michaliot and was a shareholder of the East Mediterranean Gas Company.

Maiman was the owner of Ecoteva Consulting, a real estate development and rental company in Peru. The company was founded in 2009 or 2011. After former president Alejandro Toledo was indicted on allegations of corruption over the purchase of property via the company in 2013, whereby he might have taken bribes from the Brazilian companies Camargo Corrêa and Odebrecht for the construction of the Interoceanic Highway, the company was accused of money laundering via an offshore company based in Costa Rica; the Swiss Financial Market Supervisory Authority said the money went from Confiado International Corp, a Panama-based company, to Costa Rica. By 2015, Maiman responded by saying he was the victim of a smear campaign. The two men, alongside Toledo's wife, Eliane Karp, and three others, were summoned to court in 2016. During the trial, the prosecutor, Marco Cárdenas, suggested Maiman's financial privacy should be lifted to complete his investigation.

Maiman served as the honorary consul of Israel to Peru and the Special Ambassador of Israel to Turkmenistan. He served on the board of governors of Tel Aviv University.

== Personal life ==
Maiman was married, and had three children. He resided in Herzliya, Israel, where he owned two properties, one of which is in Herzliya Pituah. He also owned apartments in Miami and New York in the United States, and two yachts, one of which he sold in 2012. He died on 9 October 2021.
