= Moshe Moskowitz =

Israeli politician (1925–2021)

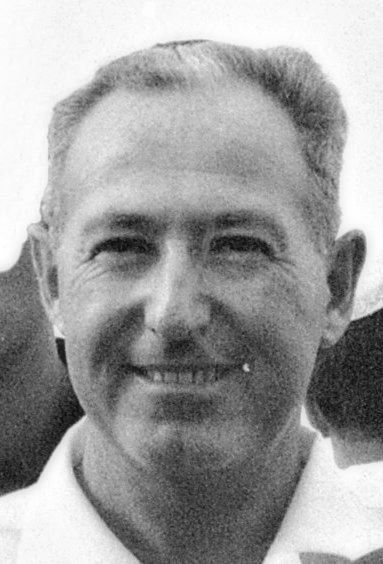
Moskowitz at the founding of Gush Etzion in 1969

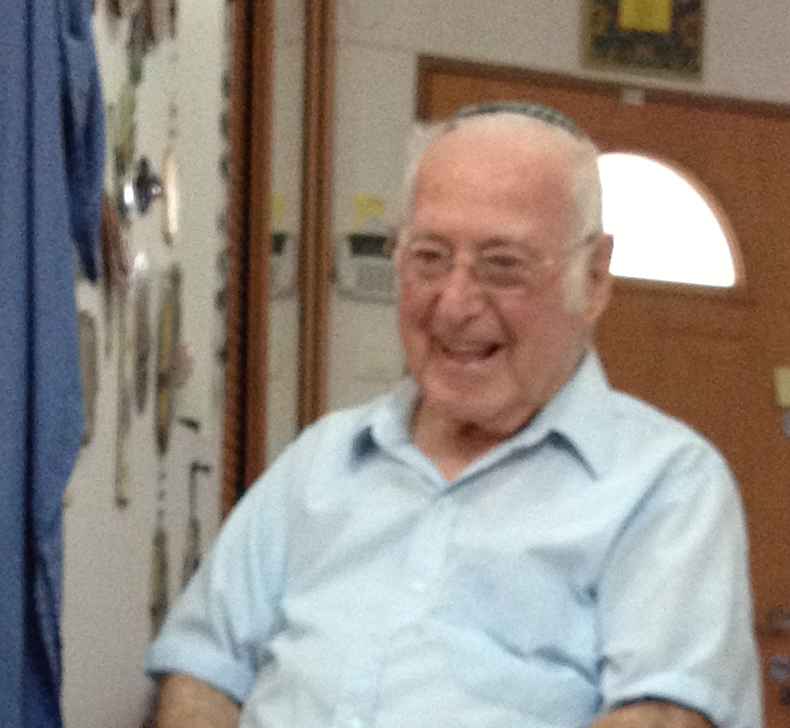
Moshe Moskowvitz

Moshe Moskowitz (Hebrew: משה מוסקוביץ; 23 January 1925 – 24 January 2021) was an Israeli politician. He was the chairman of the Shafir Regional Council (1952–1979), and one of early Gush Etzion settlers.
