= Eliyahu Matza =

Israeli judge (1935–2021)

- אליהו מצא
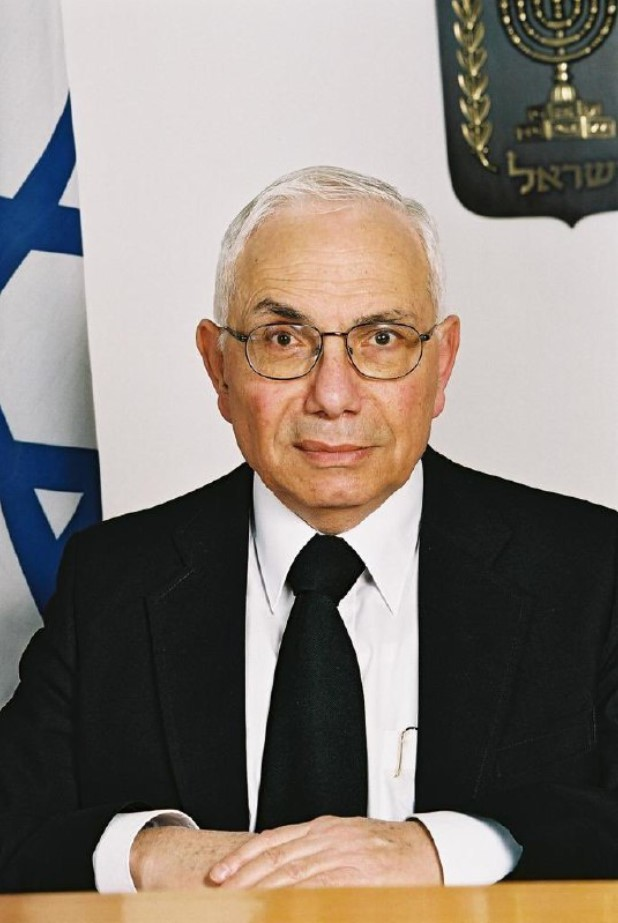

Justice of the Supreme Court of Israel
- In office 1991–2005

Personal details
- Born: 4 January 1935 Tel Aviv, Mandatory Palestine
- Died: 29 October 2021 (aged 86)
- Profession: Lawyer, judge

Eliyahu Matza (Hebrew: אליהו מצא; 4 January 1935 – 29 October 2021) was an Israeli judge. He was a justice of the Supreme Court of Israel from 1991 to 2005.
