= List of Palestinian rocket attacks on Israel in 2021 =

The following is a list of Palestinian rocket attacks on Israel in 2021.

== January ==
On 18 January, two rockets were fired from the Gaza Strip and fell in open areas near Ashdod.

On 20 January, one rocket was fired from the Gaza Strip.

== April ==
On 15 April, one rocket was fired from the Gaza Strip.

On 23 April, 36 rockets were fired from the Gaza Strip, of which six were intercepted by Israel's Iron Dome defense system. Although there were no injuries, property was damaged in several communities in Israel. The Israeli military responded with military strikes.

On 24 April, two rockets were fired from the Gaza Strip, of which one was intercepted by the Iron Dome, and the other fell in an open area near the border fence.

On 25 April, five rockets were fired from the Gaza Strip, of which two was intercepted by the Iron Dome and the others fell either in uninhabited areas or inside the Gaza Strip.

== May ==
On 9 May, six rockets were fired from the Gaza Strip, of which two were intercepted by the Iron Dome, two fell in open areas and two fell in the Gaza Strip.

Between 10–18 May, during the 2021 Israel–Palestine crisis, more than 4,340 rockets were fired toward Sderot, Ashkelon, Ashdod, Jerusalem and other communities. Ten Israelis were killed. The Iron Dome intercepted a majority of ones targeted at populated areas. About a third fell inside the Gaza Strip. Most of the others fell in open fields.

By 21 May, when a ceasefire came into effect, at least 4,000 rockets had been fired from the Gaza Strip towards Israel, of which hundreds fell short and hit Gaza.

== See also ==
- Timeline of the Israeli–Palestinian conflict in 2021
