= Baruch Nachshon =

Israeli painter (1939–2021)

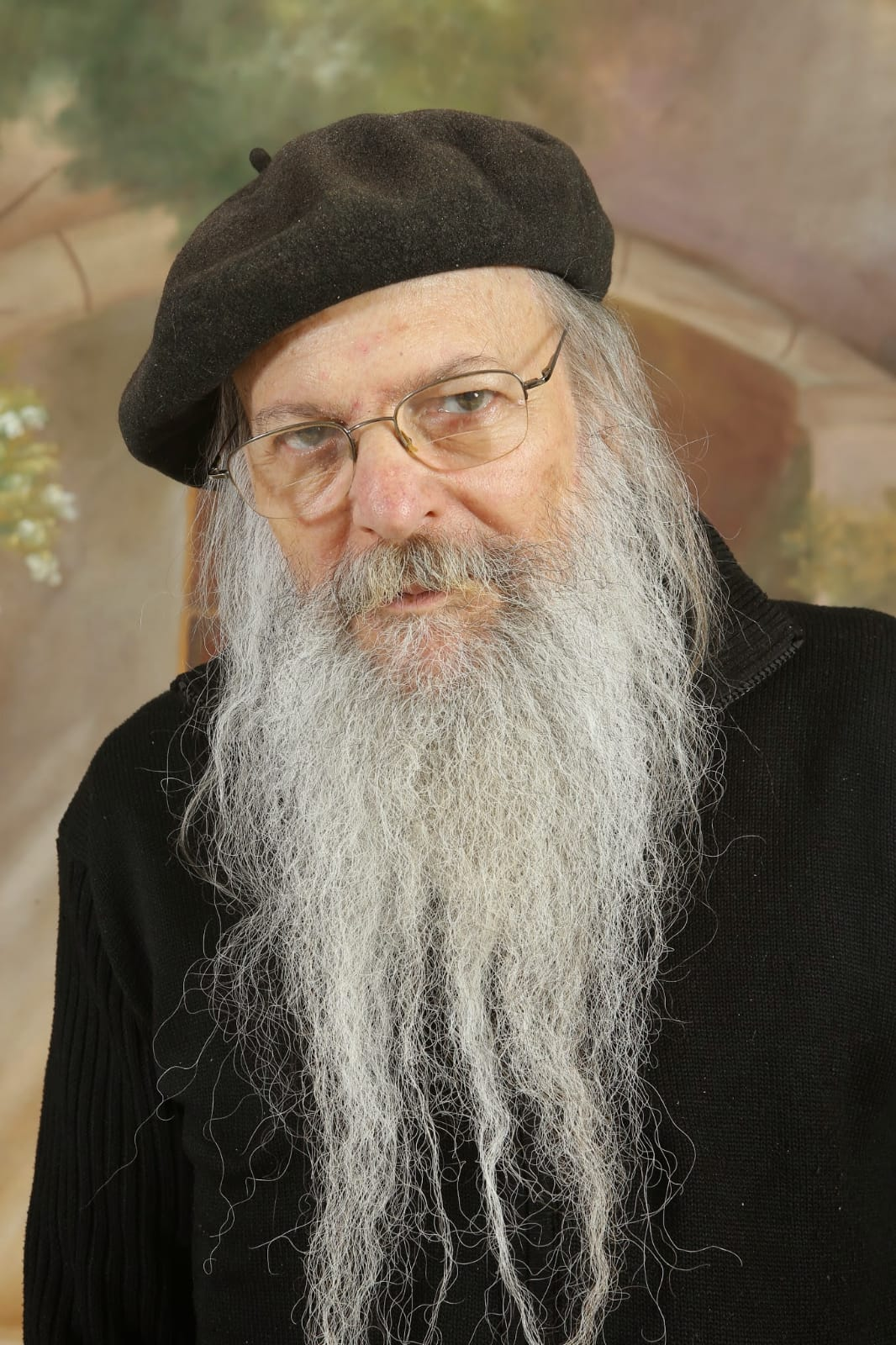

Baruch Nachshon (Hebrew: ברוך נחשון; 1939 – 2021) was an Israeli artist and mystic.

Nachshon was born in Haifa, Mandatory Palestine. Between 1950 and 1958, he studied art with Shlomo Nernai, the only student of Cézanne.

He attended the School of Visual Arts in New York for two years after receiving a scholarship from the Lubavitcher Rebbe. Nachshon's art is the only art to be exhibited at 770, Chabad Lubavitch Headquarters. In 1980, Rabbi Schneerson attended the celebratory opening of Nachshon's exhibit at 770 himself.

Nachshon's art translates Biblical stories and rabbinic interpretations into visual art.

His paintings have been exhibited around the world, in the U.S., Canada, Brazil and Argentina, Australia, England and Hong Kong. In 2015 Koren Publishing released a book of psalms illustrated by Nachshon and annotated by Rabbi Adin Steinsaltz (Even-Israel).

He is one of the founders of the Jewish residence in Hebron. He was one of the first settlers in the city following the Six Day War in 1967.

Nachshon died on 13 September 2021 at the age of 82.

== Awards ==
He was recognized by Bar Ilan University in 1989 as an Outstanding Israeli Artist.
