= Ampal-American Israel Corporation =

Holding company

- Industry: Investment
- Founded: 1942 as Ampal-American Palestine Trading Corporation
- Defunct: 2013
- Fate: Chapter 7 bankruptcy
- Headquarters: Tel Aviv
- Key people: Yossi Maiman
- Revenue: ▲US$ 496.93 million (2010)
- Operating income: ▼US$ -78.32 million (2010)
- Net income: ▼US$ -44.74 million (2010)
- Owner: Yossi Maiman
- Number of employees: 25
- Website: www.ampal.com

Ampal-American Israel Corporation was a New York unit of Israel's Bank Hapoalim. It was a holding company that primarily acquired interests in Israel-related businesses.

== History ==
In 1942, members of the Labor Zionist movement founded AMPAL to guarantee loans for financial projects in the Jewish Yishuv. From 1945, the corporation financed the development of basic industries, utilities and housing.

In 1998, Ampal acquired a one-third interest in Motorola Solutions Israel Ltd., a wireless-communications business in Israel, for $110 million, as a springboard for other investments in the telecommunications and high-tech sector.

In 2002, businessman Yossi Maiman acquired Ampal from Beny Steinmetz for US $174 million in 2002. He served as its chairman from 2002 to 2013, and as its president and chief executive officer from 2006 to 2013. The company's main holding is a 12% stake in the East Mediterranean Gas Company (EMG), a joint venture company set up to handle the export of natural gas from Egypt to Israel.

Following four attacks on the gas pipeline that connects to the company's Arish–Ashkelon pipeline, supply has been interrupted and as of September 2011 has not resumed. As a result, the company's debentures have been downgraded by Moody's to BA3.

In 2013, a New York Court ordered that Ampal be liquidated under Chapter 7 bankruptcy proceedings.

== See also ==
- Economy of Israel
