= Eddy Zemach =

Israeli philosopher (1935–2021)

- Born: March 9, 1935; Jerusalem
- Died: May 21, 2021 (aged 86), Jerusalem
- Citizenship: Israeli · United States
- Education: Hebrew University of Jerusalem(Master) Yale University (PhD)

Eddy M. Zemach (Hebrew: אדי צמח; 1935 – 21 May 2021) was an Israeli philosopher and professor, born in Jerusalem, Mandatory Palestine.

He was Ahad Ha'am Professor Emeritus in the Department of Philosophy at the Hebrew University of Jerusalem. He received his Ph.D. from Yale University in 1965, where he then went on to teach in the Philosophy Department of Yale’s Graduate School of Arts and Sciences. His main research interests were aesthetics, metaphysics, epistemology, philosophy of psychology, and philosophy of language.

== Major works ==
- 1970: Analytic Aesthetics, Daga (in Hebrew).
- 1976: Aesthetics, Institute for Poetics & Semiotics (in Hebrew).
- 1992: The Reality of Meaning and the Meaning of 'Reality', Brown U. Press.
- 1992: Types: Essays in Metaphysics, E. J. Brill Publishers.
- 1997: Real Beauty, Penn State Press.
- 2001: Mind and Right, Magnes Press (in Hebrew).
