= Amichai Shoham =

Israeli footballer (1922–2021)

Personal information
- Date of birth: 1922
- Date of death: 25 May 2021 (aged 99)
- Position: Forward

Senior career*
| Years | Team | Apps | (Gls) |
| 1941–1954 | Hapoel Petah Tikva | | |

International career
- Israel
- * Club domestic league appearances and goals

Amichai Shoham (Hebrew: עמיחי שוהם; 1922 – 25 May 2021) was an Israeli footballer who played as a forward for Hapoel Petah Tikva between 1941 and 1954, as well as the Israel national team.

He was born in Ein Ganim, which became a neighborhood of Petah Tikvah, and lived there. After his football career, he became a youth coach at Hapoel Petah Tikva, and later worked in the construction industry. He was buried in Segula Cemetery in Petah Tikvah.
