= Yehoshua Zuckerman =

Israeli rabbi (1938–2021)

- יהושע צוקרמן
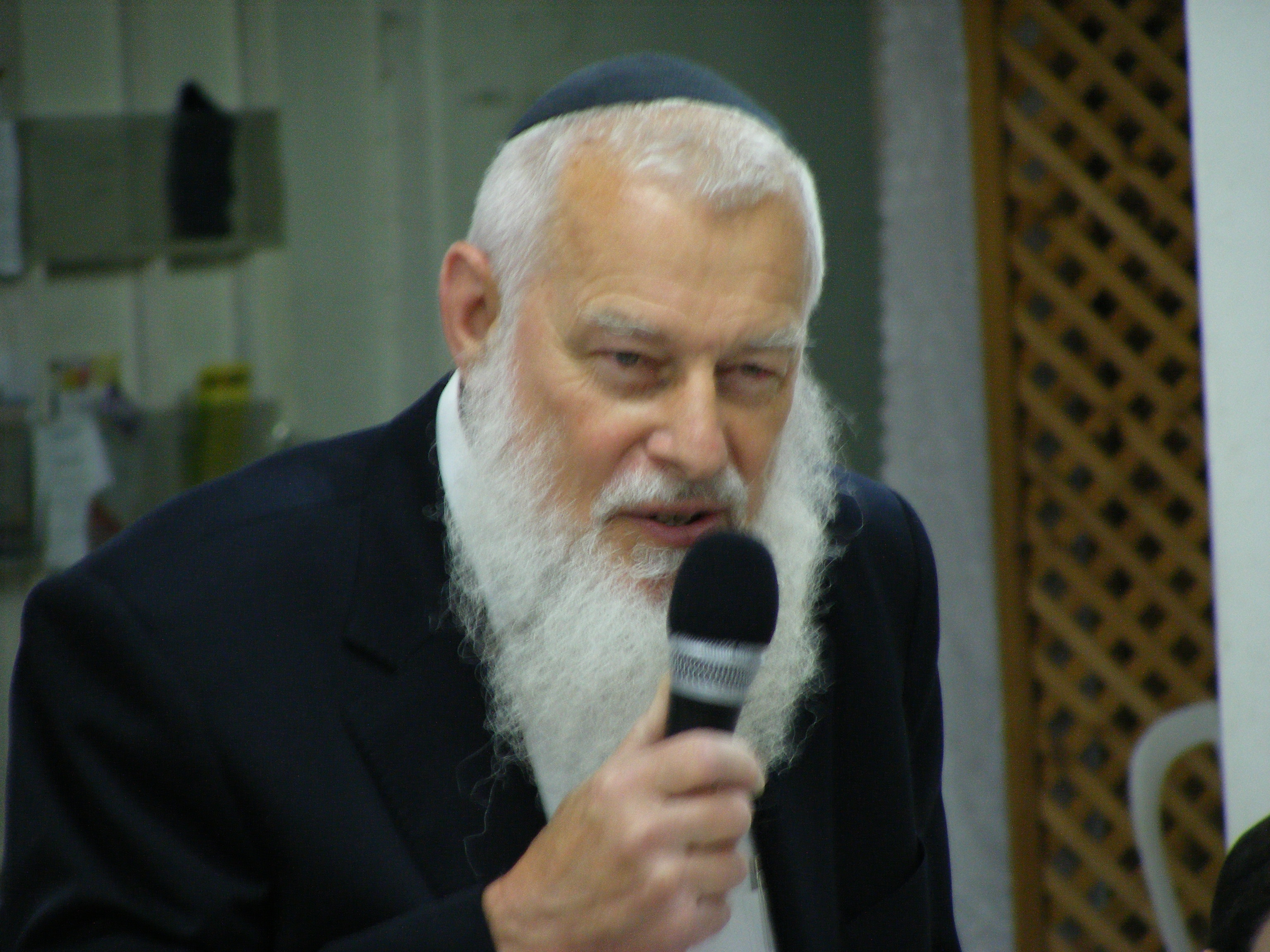
- Zuckerman in 2009
- Born: 9 July 1938; Belgium
- Died: 11 August 2021 (aged 83)
- Occupation: Rabbi

Yehoshua Zuckerman (Hebrew: יהושע צוקרמן; 9 July 1938 – 11 August 2021) was a Belgian-born Israeli rabbi. He taught at Mercaz HaRav and Har Hamor and specialized in the writings of Rabbi Abraham Isaac Kook.

== Biography ==
Born in Belgium, he was active in the Bnei Akiva movement and studied with Rabbi Léon Ashkenazi. He moved to Israel in the mid-1960s and studied at Mercaz HaRay. He was a prominent disciple of Rabbi Zvi Yehuda Kook and helped start numerous educational foundations in Israel, such as the El Ami movement, the Yeshiva Ayelet Hacha'har in Eilat, the Midrechet Harova, and Har Hamor.

Yehoshua Zuckerman died on 11 August 2021 at the age of 83.
