= Roei Sadan =

Israeli cyclist (1982–2021)

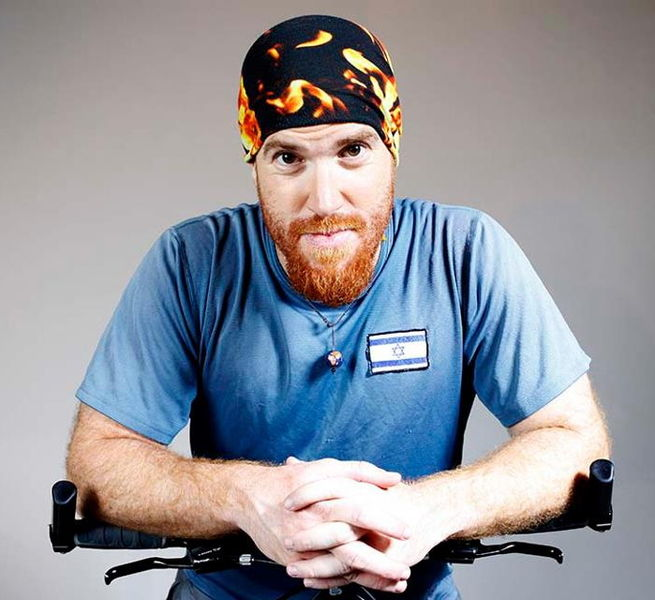

Roei Sadan (Hebrew: רועי סדן; 1982 – 12 March 2021) was an Israeli adventurer who became famous worldwide for cycling around the world.

== Biography ==
Sadan was born and raised in the Israeli settlement of Oranit, West Bank, and later moved to kibbutz Rosh HaNikra. After completing his military service in the Israel Defense Forces, he became involved in mountain climbing and even undertook a professional mountain climbing course in India. However, eventually Roei become involved in cycling and drew his attention to preparing for a long and intensive worldwide cycling journey. Roei's worldwide cycling voyage started in July 2007, in Alaska’s Prudhoe Bay, a voyage that lasted four and a half years. The mental and physical preparation for the journey took one year and equipped him for the longest and most extensive trip ever taken by an Israeli, including cycling over 66,000 km around the world, crossing 42 countries, spreading over North America, South America, Africa, Europe, Asia and Australia. Sadan's voyage was a solitary one, without the support of any logistic teams.

Sadan next planned a kayak trip across the West Coast of North America. In 2015, while taking a break from his training for the trip, he vacationed in India where he was seriously injured in a mountain climbing accident in the Stok Kangri mountain range. While descending after having climbed a mountain, Sadan slipped on a rock and fell, plummeting about 500 meters and bouncing off of rocks on the way down. He was caught by a group of climbers passing below, who absorbed the force of his fall. The hikers kept Sadan alive with an oxygen bottle before a helicopter arrived to evacuate him to a hospital in Leh, from where he was later transferred to another hospital in New Delhi. After being stabilized, he was flown to Israel where he was hospitalized at Sheba Medical Center and was in a coma for more than a month before awakening. He had to undergo lengthy rehabilitation and physical therapy.

On 11 March 2021, while riding his bicycle near Rosh Hanikra, Sadan was hit by a bus and suffered permanent brain damage. Paramedics found him unconscious with severe injuries and without vital signs. After resuscitation efforts were made to restore his pulse, he was taken to Galilee Medical Center in Nahariya, where he was put on a respirator. He died at the hospital the next day, and his organs were donated to 7 patients.

== Cycling across the continents ==
- North America – crossing the continent from north to south: from Prudhoe Bay, Alaska (the most northern point of the journey), through Dalton Highway, Yukon Territory and British Columbia in Canada, crossing The Rocky Mountains through the Icefields Parkway, the city of Vancouver, via California State Route 1 and down to Central America. Covering about 1,600 km.
- South America – crossing the continent from north to south: from the northern Colombian city of Cartagena de Indias, through the Andes, Lake Titicaca, the Salar de Uyuni desert, crossing via the Laguna Colorada, across the winding Carretera Austral; in Chile, and all the way to Tierra del Fuego and the city of Ushuaia (the most southern point of the journey). Covering about 1,400 km.
- Africa – crossing the continent from south to north: from Cape Town, across South Africa's Garden Route, through Swaziland, the eastern Africa countries, the Ethiopian capital Addis Ababa and up to the northern city of Axum. Covering about 10,000 km.
- Europe – crossing the continent from west to east: from the city of A Coruña in the north west of Spain, crossing across País Vasco and the city of Bilbao, through France, Switzerland, Italy, Greece, ending in Istanbul, Turkey. Covering about 5,000 km.
- Asia, crossing the continent from west to east: Starting in Georgia, crossing the Caspian Sea, the western Asia countries, The Silk Road, the Irkeshtam pass, the Taklamakan Desert of China and ending where the Great Wall of China meets the ocean (the Yellow Sea). Covering about 11,000 km.
- Australia & New Zealand, crossing New Zealand from south to north: from the South Island city of Dunedin and up to Cape Reinga in the North Island. Crossing Australia from west to east: from the Western Australian capital of Perth, across The Gibson Desert, to Uluru in the centre of the Northern Territory, down to the South Australian capital of Adelaide, via The Great Ocean Road, through Melbourne the capital of Victoria and ending in Sydney, the capital of New South Wales. Covering about 10,000 km in Australia & New Zealand.
- Journey finale: 5 days cycling across Israel, ending in the Western Wall in Jerusalem, escorted by many cyclists and local media.
