= Isaac of Ourville =

Isaac of Ourville (Hebrew: יצחק מאורביל Yiṣḥaq me-Orvil, fl. late 13th century) was a medieval French rabbi, author of the mostly-lost Sefer haMenahel, a book of halakha (Jewish ritual law).

== Life and Time ==
Isaac appears to have been a contemporary of Perez of Corbeil (died c. 1297); Isaac cites Moses of Coucy's Semag, from the generation before Perez, while segments of Isaac's Menahel are, in turn, cited alongside the Perez's teachings. His master was Hayyim of Blois, who is possibly identical with Hayyim ben Isaac the Frenchman (Hebrew: חיים בן יצחק הצרפתי), the author of Ez Hayyim on Jewish monetary law, a disciple of Samuel of Evreux.

== Toponym ==
Carmoly and others read אורביל as "Orbeil", a village in the Puy-de-Dôme department, while Gross considered this unlikely, as Orbeil probably had no Jewish population in medieval times. According to Gross, אורביל is probably Ourville (Ourville-en-Caux), Seine-Maritime, or perhaps Orville, Orne. Isaac is thus sometimes named האורבלי HaOrvili (or HaOrbeli). He was confused by Samuel David Luzzato with a similarly named rabbinical authority, Isaac ben Dorbolo, after Rapoport's misinterpretation of the latter's patronymic as "d'Orbolo".

== Work ==
Most of his only known work, the halakhic Sefer HaMenahel (Hebrew: המנהל "the Guide"), is lost, but select portions have survived as follows:

- Quoted by name in the closely related pair of halakhic works, Orhot Hayyim by Aaron ben Jacob ha-Kohen and Kol Bo.
- Incorporated anonymously into the halakhic decisions of Menahem Recanati.
- Quoted by name in two manuscripts of commentary to the Sefer Mitzvot Katan, JTS Rab. 1033 and Bodleian Opp. 338. A third manuscript of commentary to the SM"K, once held by the Collegio Rabbinico Italiano, also contained content from the Menahel, but the Collegio's entire library was confiscated by the Nazis in December 1944 and has never been recovered.
- MS Paris heb. 407 f. 236r includes a list of Gershom ben Judah's bans copied out of the Menahel.
