= Liebes (disambiguation) =

Liebes is an uninhabited island in the Baltic Sea.

Liebes is also a surname. Notable people with the name include:

- Dorothy Liebes (1897–1972), American textile designer and weaver
- Joseph Gerhard Liebes (1910–1988), Israeli translator and scholar of Ancient Greek classical literature and Latin literature into Hebrew
- Yehuda Liebes (born 1947), Israeli academic and scholar, Gershom Scholem Professor Emeritus of Kabbalah at the Hebrew University of Jerusalem
