= The Messenger: The Story of Joan of Arc =

1999 film by Luc Besson

- French theatrical release poster
- French: Jeanne d'Arc
- Directed by: Luc Besson
- Written by: Luc Besson; Andrew Birkin
- Produced by: Patrice Ledoux
- Starring: Milla Jovovich; John Malkovich; Faye Dunaway; Dustin Hoffman; Pascal Greggory; Vincent Cassel; Tchéky Karyo; Richard Ridings; Desmond Harrington; Timothy West
- Cinematography: Thierry Arbogast
- Edited by: Sylvie Landra
- Music by: Éric Serra
- Production company: Gaumont
- Distributed by: Gaumont Buena Vista International (France); Columbia Pictures (International)
- Release dates: 18 October 1999 (premiere); 27 October 1999 (France)
- Running time: 158 minutes
- Country: France
- Language: English
- Budget: $60 million
- Box office: $67 million

The Messenger: The Story of Joan of Arc (French: Jeanne d'Arc) is a 1999 English-language French historical drama film directed by Luc Besson and starring Milla Jovovich, John Malkovich, Faye Dunaway and Dustin Hoffman. The screenplay was written by Besson and Andrew Birkin, and the original score was composed by Éric Serra.

The Messenger portrays the story of Joan of Arc, the French war heroine and religious martyr of the Hundred Years' War. It begins with young Joan as she witnesses the atrocities of the English against her family, and she has visions that inspire her to lead the French in battle against the occupying English. Her success in routing the English allows Charles VII to take the throne. Eventually, Joan is captured by the English, tried and executed for heresy.

Besson's previous film, The Fifth Element (1997), which also stars Jovovich, was a critical and financial success, and had a positive influence on both of their careers. The Messenger was intended to follow that success and cement Besson's and Jovovich's status in film. However, the film received mixed reviews and was a box office bomb, earning just $67 million on a $60 million budget.

== Plot ==
As a child, Joan of Arc had a violent and supernatural vision. She returns home to find her village burning. Her older sister, Catherine, tries to protect her by hiding her from the attacking English forces. While hiding, Joan witnesses the brutal murder and rape of her sister. In shock, Joan is taken in by distant relatives.

Several years later in Chinon, the Dauphin and soon to be King of France, Charles VII, receives a message from the now-adult Joan, asking him to provide an army to lead into battle against the occupying English. After meeting him and his mother-in-law Yolande of Aragon, she describes her visions. Desperate, he believes her prophecy.

Clad in armour, Joan leads the French armies to the besieged city of Orléans. She gives the English a chance to surrender, which they refuse. The armies' commanders, skeptical of Joan's leadership, initiate the next morning's battle to take over the stockade at St. Loup without her. By the time she arrives on the battlefield, the French soldiers are retreating. Joan ends the retreat and leads another charge, successfully capturing the fort. They proceed to the enemy stronghold called the Tourelles. Joan gives the English another chance to surrender, but they refuse. She leads the French attack on the Tourelles, although the English defenders inflict heavy casualties, severely wounding Joan. Nevertheless, Joan leads a second attack the following day, and the stronghold is captured. As the English army regroups, the French army moves to face them across an open field. Joan rides alone toward the English and offers them a final chance to surrender and return to England. The English accept her offer and retreat.

Joan returns to Reims to witness the coronation of Charles VII of France. Her military campaigns continue to the walls of Paris, although she does not receive her requested reinforcements, and the siege is a failure. Joan asks King Charles VII for another army, but he refuses, saying he now prefers diplomacy over warfare. Believing she threatens his position and will require the expenditure of treasure, Charles conspires to get rid of Joan by having her captured by enemy forces. She is taken prisoner by the pro-English Burgundians at Compiègne, who sell her to the English. The English then held a trial for her in Rouen while placing her in shackles.

Based on her claim of visions and signs from God, she is tried for heresy in an ecclesiastical court proceeding. The English wish to quickly condemn and execute Joan, for English soldiers are afraid to fight while she remains alive, based on their belief that she can supernaturally affect battles while in prison. Bishop Cauchon expresses his fear of wrongfully executing someone who might have received visions from God. Convicted, Joan is distraught that she will be executed without making a final confession. The Bishop tells her she must recant her visions before he can hear her confession. Joan signs the recantation. The relieved Bishop shows the paper to the English, asserting that Joan can no longer be burned as a heretic. While in her cell, Joan is confronted by her conscience and she questions whether she was actually receiving messages from God.

The frustrated English devise another way to have Joan executed by the Church. English soldiers go into Joan's cell, rip her clothes and give her men's clothing to wear. The English claim she conjured a spell to make the new clothing appear and that she is a witch who must be burned. Although suspecting the English are lying, the Bishop abandons Joan to her fate and she is burned alive in the marketplace of Rouen. A postscript adds that she was canonised as a saint in the 20th century.

== Cast ==
- Milla Jovovich as Joan of Arc
- John Malkovich as Charles VII of France
- Faye Dunaway as Yolande of Aragon
- Dustin Hoffman as The Conscience
- Andrew Birkin as John Talbot
- Jane Valentine as Joan of Arc at 8 years old
- Vincent Cassel as Gilles de Rais
- Pascal Greggory as John II, Duke of Alençon
- Richard Ridings as La Hire
- Desmond Harrington as Jean d'Aulon
- Timothy West as Pierre Cauchon
- Gina McKee as Duchess of Bedford
- Tchéky Karyo as Jean de Dunois
- Joseph Malerba as Beaurevoir's Guard
- Vincent Regan as Buck
- Toby Jones as English Judge
- Julie-Anne Roth as the young girl in the bath

== Themes ==
Luc Besson stated that he was not interested in narrating the history of Joan of Arc; rather, he wanted to pull a message from history that is relevant for today. Besson said that to achieve this, he stepped away from the factual narrative of the 15th century, instead trying to get behind the "exterior envelope", and into both the emotional effect and emotional affect of Joan. In the book, The Films of Luc Besson, Susan Hayward interpreted this as meaning Besson sought to follow Joan emotionally, revealing her doubts, and demonstrating that one cannot return intact from the experience of war.

As medievalist Gwendolyn Morgan observed, Joan's sanity is a continuing theme throughout the film, beginning with the priest questioning her as a child, and ending with her conversations with "The Conscience" in the film's final scenes. Scholars view The Conscience as providing a postmodern explanation of Joan's visions. In Joan's time, her voices and visions would not have been doubted. John Aberth, in the book, A Knight at the Movies, stated the filmmakers invented The Conscience to satisfy a modern audience that is aware of mental illness.

The film was also said to have "feminist undercurrents". After Joan witnesses the rape of her sister, her crusade is said to become "a fight against male domination and the abuse of women".

Writing in Exemplaria, Nickolas Haydock considered the witnessing of her sister's murder and rape to be an alternate psychological motivation for Joan to want to fight the English rather than just her visions. Haydock also considered a theme in the film to be the inability of the Church to fulfill individual spiritual needs. This is evident through many of Joan's encounters with the Church: as a girl she is asked about going to confession too often, denied communion and forced to sneak into the church to take it herself; and during her trial, when she is denied confession until The Conscience confesses her instead.

Writing in Studies in Medievalism XIII, Christa Canitz considered anti-intellectualism to be present in The Messenger; Joan admits to not knowing how to read or write, and has not received any formal education, military or otherwise, yet triumphs over those who have. Haydock commented that Joan possesses a quick wit that she uses against the unrelenting accusatory questions provided by her "intellectual superiors" during the trial. Joan also manages to triumph in battle where those with more experience and knowledge could not, made especially apparent by her reverse use of a siege weapon to force open a gate.

== Production ==
Luc Besson was originally hired as executive producer for a film that was to be directed by Kathryn Bigelow. Bigelow had been developing ideas for a Joan of Arc film for nearly a decade. Her film was to be titled Company of Angels, with Jay Cocks hired to write the script. The film was to be made with Besson's assistance and financial backing. In July 1996, contracts between Bigelow and Besson were exchanged that gave Besson the right to be consulted on casting, in addition to his personal fee. According to Bigelow, eight weeks prior to filming, Besson realised that his then-wife, Milla Jovovich, was not going to be cast as Joan. He subsequently withdrew his support from the film, and, with it, the support of his financial backers. Bigelow threatened legal action for breach of contract and "stealing her research"; the matter was settled out of court. After Besson left, he began production of his own Joan of Arc project, The Messenger, with Jovovich given the lead role; the production of Company of Angels disbanded shortly thereafter. The Messenger was intended to follow the success Besson and Jovovich achieved with their previous collaboration, The Fifth Element.

Filming took place in the Czech Republic. A stuntman died in an accident during the first weeks of filming. Besson was said to have become completely uncommunicative after the incident, appearing on set only to shout orders at people.

Filming also took place in the Orne department, including in Sées, Gacé, Cisai-Saint-Aubin and La Trinité-des-Laitiers. The king's coronation was staged at Sées Cathedral, where a realistic medieval village was recreated on the parvis. Other scenes took place at the Château de Gacé. The Château de Beynac in the Dordogne was also used as a set. In November 1998, filming took place at the Palais des comtes de Poitou – ducs d'Aquitaine in Poitiers.

== Soundtrack ==
The Messenger: The Story of Joan of Arc

Soundtrack album by Éric Serra
- Released: 2 November 1999
- Genre: Film score
- Label: Sony Music Entertainment

Éric Serra chronology
The Fifth Element (1997)	The Messenger: The Story of Joan of Arc (1999)	L'Art (délicat) de la séduction (2001)

The soundtrack for the film was composed by Éric Serra, and released as an album via Sony Music Entertainment. It was Serra's eighth collaboration with director Luc Besson, having composed soundtracks for seven of Besson's previous films, including La Femme Nikita and Léon: The Professional. The album runs approximately 64 minutes; some form of music is playing during about 90 percent of the film. Commentators noted the change in Serra's work, which had traditionally relied heavily on synthesiser effects. The Messenger, on the other hand, is a primarily orchestral score, as justified by the film's historical context, although synthesised effects are still used in some tracks. Writing in The Films of Luc Besson, Mark Brownrigg stated Serra's score completed his evolution from pop-score writer to orchestral film composer; Serra's previous score for The Fifth Element had also used orchestral elements. They gave a favorable review of the score, although they criticised the music heard during Joan's death, describing it as an unimaginative paraphrasing of Carmina Burana. Heather Phares from Allmusic gave the album 3 stars out of 5, stating it "combines orchestral, rock, and electronic elements for a sweeping, cinematic experience". Dan Goldwasser of Soundtrack.net gave the soundtrack 4 stars out of 5, stating it was "very satisfying to listen to", although he expressed disappointment with the absence on the soundtrack of a particular piece of music present during Joan's discussion with The Conscience.

== Historical accuracy ==
The scene in which Joan witnesses her sister's murder and posthumous rape by English soldiers in their village is entirely a fictional construction. Joan and her family fled their village before it was attacked, and it was actually attacked by the Burgundians, not the English. In the film, Joan is seen experiencing visions as a young child; in actuality, Joan asserted that these visions began around age 13. Joan is also seen finding her sword in a field as a child, whereas, historically, it was uncovered many years later on her journey to Chinon. Philip the Good is portrayed to be irreligious, whereas he was actually a devout Catholic.

Hayward credits Besson with showing the collaboration between the Burgundians and the English more accurately than previous filmmakers. Many lines during scenes of Joan's trial were taken verbatim from Joan's real trial transcript. Joan is shown receiving both of the wounds she was given in real life (an arrow above the breast, and an arrow to the leg), and the film includes some of the 15th-century accounts associated with Joan, such as being able to pick out Charles VII from among a group of his courtiers at Chinon. The examining of Joan's virginity was a real test Joan had to complete to prove her merit.

== Release ==
The film was released in France on 27 October 1999 and in the US on 12 November 1999. It had a running time of 158 minutes, except for in the US where it was cut to 148 minutes.

=== Box office ===
The film grossed US$14,276,317 in the United States, plus $52,700,000 from the rest of the world, for a combined gross of $66,976,317.

=== Critical response ===
Metacritic review
breakdown (unweighted)

Positive
12 (36%)
Mixed
18 (55%)
Negative
3 (9%)

The Messenger received mixed reviews. On Rotten Tomatoes, the film has a score of 31%, based on reviews from 75 critics. The consensus states: "The heavy-handed narrative collapses under its own weight." On Metacritic, the film holds a score of 54, based on 33 reviews, indicating "mixed or average" reception. Audiences polled by CinemaScore gave the film an average grade of "B-" on an A+ to F scale.

Roger Ebert of the Chicago Sun-Times gave the film 2 stars out of 4, writing, "The movie is a mess: a gassy costume epic with nobody at the center." Ebert stated that the film may have been educational for the test-audience participants who wrote, "Why does she have to die at the end?", on their evaluation cards.

In Todd McCarthy's review for Variety, he praised the film's action scenes and technical aspects, including Thierry Arbogast's cinematography, although he gave an overall negative review. He criticised the casting of Jovovich, stating the only thing she brought to the film was "her strikingly tall and skinny physicality, which is not exactly how one has been led to picture [Joan]".

Ron Wells from Film Threat, however, gave the film four stars out of five. Also praising the action scenes, Wells stated that the film's main strength was its "adult ambiguities and relationships"; its decision not to portray Joan as a "super-hero", but rather to let the audience decide whether she was a prophet or merely bipolar, concluding, "This film, as most things that involve religion, is better understood if you learn not to take everything so literally".

== Accolades ==
The Messenger was nominated for eight awards at the 25th César Awards, of which it won two: Costume Design and Best Sound. The film also won two Lumière Awards for Best Director and Best Film. It was nominated for "Most Original" trailer at the 1999 Golden Trailer Awards, Best Costume Design and Best Production Design at the 1999 Las Vegas Film Critics Society Awards, and won the Golden Reel Award for Best Sound Editing.

Conversely, Milla Jovovich's performance was nominated for a Golden Raspberry Award for Worst Actress.

Year	Event	Award	Nominee	Result
1999	Golden Raspberry Awards	Worst Actress	Milla Jovovich	Nominated
1999	Golden Trailer Awards	Most Original	Imaginary Forces	Nominated
1999	Las Vegas Film Critics Society Awards	Best Costume Design	Catherine Leterrier	Nominated
1999	Las Vegas Film Critics Society Awards	Best Production Design	Hugues Tissandier	Nominated
2000	César Award	Best Costume Design	Catherine Leterrier	Won
2000	César Award	Best Sound	François Groult, Bruno Tarriere, Vincent Tulli	Won
2000	César Award	Best Director	Luc Besson	Nominated
2000	César Award	Best Photography	Thierry Arbogast	Nominated
2000	César Award	Best Editing	Sylvie Landra	Nominated
2000	César Award	Best Music	Éric Serra	Nominated
2000	César Award	Best Production Design	Hugues Tissandier	Nominated
2000	César Award	Best Film	The Messenger: The Story of Joan of Arc	Nominated
2000	Golden Reel Award	Best Sound Editing: Foreign Feature	Sound production team	Won
2000	Lumière Awards	Best Director	Luc Besson	Won
2000	Lumière Awards	Best Film	The Messenger: The Story of Joan of Arc	Won

== Home media ==
The Messenger was released on DVD in the US on 4 April 2000. The DVD presented the film in its original 2.35:1 aspect ratio, and contained the original cut, running ten minutes longer than the U.S. theatrical cut. It featured English subtitles, interactive menus, "talent files", a two-page production booklet, a 24-minute HBO First Look special titled The Messenger: The Search for the Real Joan of Arc, the film's theatrical trailer, as well as trailers for Run Lola Run, Léon: The Professional and Orlando. The DVD also contained Éric Serra's original score for the film, presented in Dolby Digital 5.1 surround sound, as was the film itself. While criticizing the film itself, Heather Picker of DVD Talk gave a favorable review of the DVD release.

The film was released on Blu-ray in the US on 2 December 2008. It contained the original version of the film, with audio in English, French, Portuguese, Spanish and Thai, and subtitles in 10 languages. Glenn Erickson of DVD Talk also criticised the film, yet praised the Blu-ray release, rating it 4½ stars out of 5 for its video quality, and 4 out of 5 for its audio, although giving it only 1½ stars for its extras, noting the lack of special features. A review at Blu-Ray.com also gave a favorable review of both the audio and visual quality, stating "I don't think that there is much here one could be dissatisfied with". High-Def Digest, however, gave a more negative review. While praising the audio quality, the lack of special features was criticised, as was the video quality, which was described as being "smothered" with edge enhancement. The reviewer concluded, "Sony is practically begging people not to buy it."

The film was released in the US on 4K UHD Blu-Ray as part of a Luc Besson box set on 11 November 2025. It contained the original version of the film and the shorter US cut. It also included an 88-minute making-of documentary, In the Footsteps of Joan, as well as the documentary The Messenger: The Search for the Real Joan of Arc and interviews with director of photography Thierry Arbogast and editor Sylvie Landra.
