= Lag BaOmer =

Jewish holiday

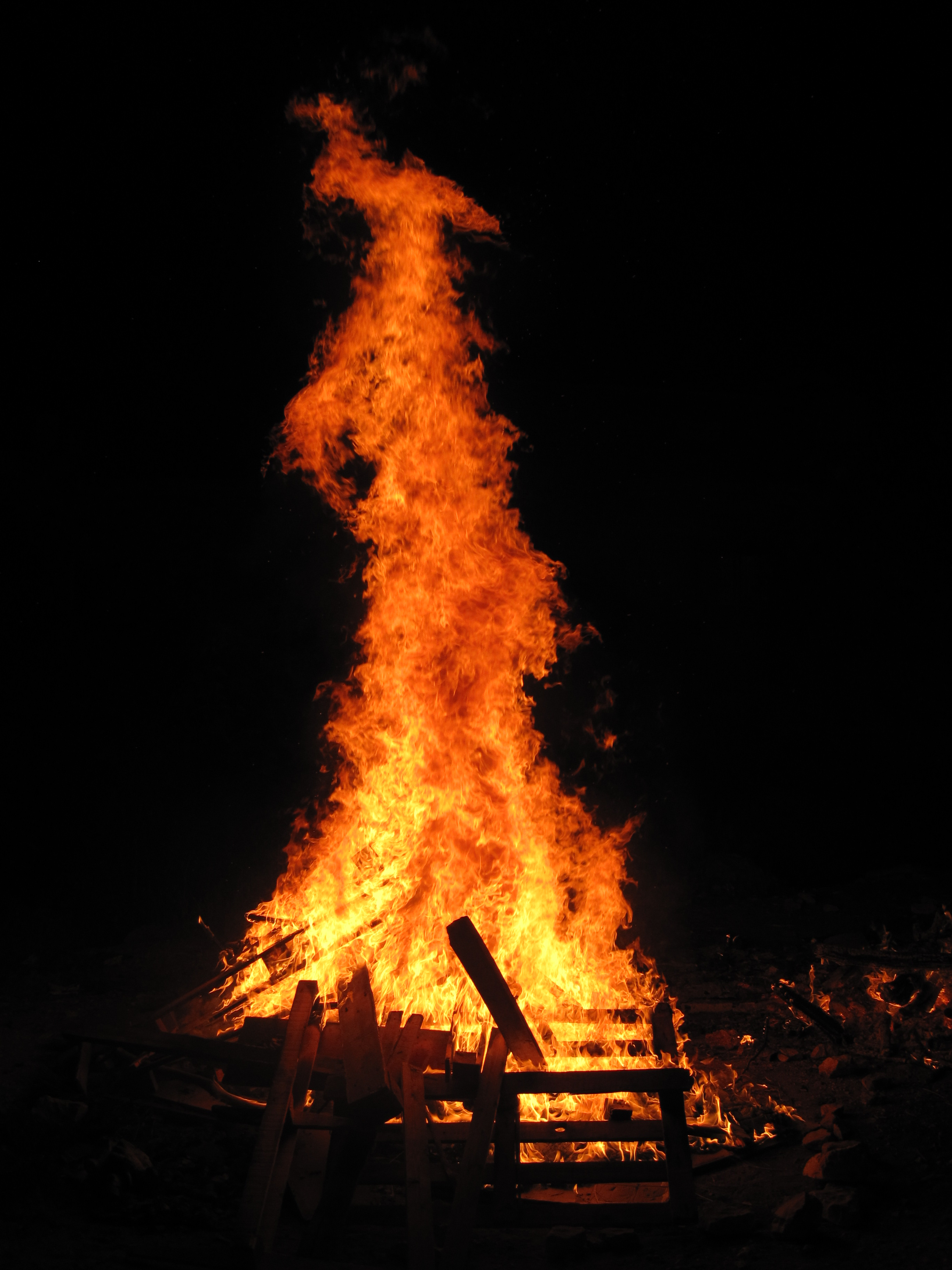
- A Lag BaOmer bonfire celebration in Israel, symbol of the holiday
- Official name: לַ״ג בָּעוֹמֶר
- Type: Jewish
- Significance: 33rd day of the Counting of the Omer, which begins the 2nd day of Pesach
- Begins: 18th day of Iyar
- Date: 18 Iyar
- 2025 date: Sunset, 15 May – nightfall, 16 May
- 2026 date: Sunset, 4 May – nightfall, 5 May
- 2027 date: Sunset, 24 May – nightfall, 25 May
- 2028 date: Sunset, 13 May – nightfall, 14 May
- Related to: Pesach, Shavuot, Counting of the Omer

Lag BaOmer (Hebrew: לַ״ג בָּעוֹמֶר, LaG Bāʿōmer lit. '"33rd [day] in the Omer"'), also Lag B'Omer or Lag LaOmer, is a Jewish religious holiday celebrated on the 33rd day of the Counting of the Omer, which occurs on the 18th day of the Hebrew month of Iyar.

According to the Rishonim, the plague that killed 24,000 of Rabbi Akiva's students ended on Lag BaOmer. For some communities, the mourning period of the Counting of the Omer thus concludes on Lag BaOmer.

The Hillula of Rabbi Shimon bar Yochai, is held on Lag BaOmer to mark the anniversary of his death. According to a late medieval tradition, pilgrimages are made to the burial place of Shimon bar Yochai in Meron on this day.

The holiday also serves to commemorate the Bar Kokhba revolt against the Roman Empire.

== Etymology ==
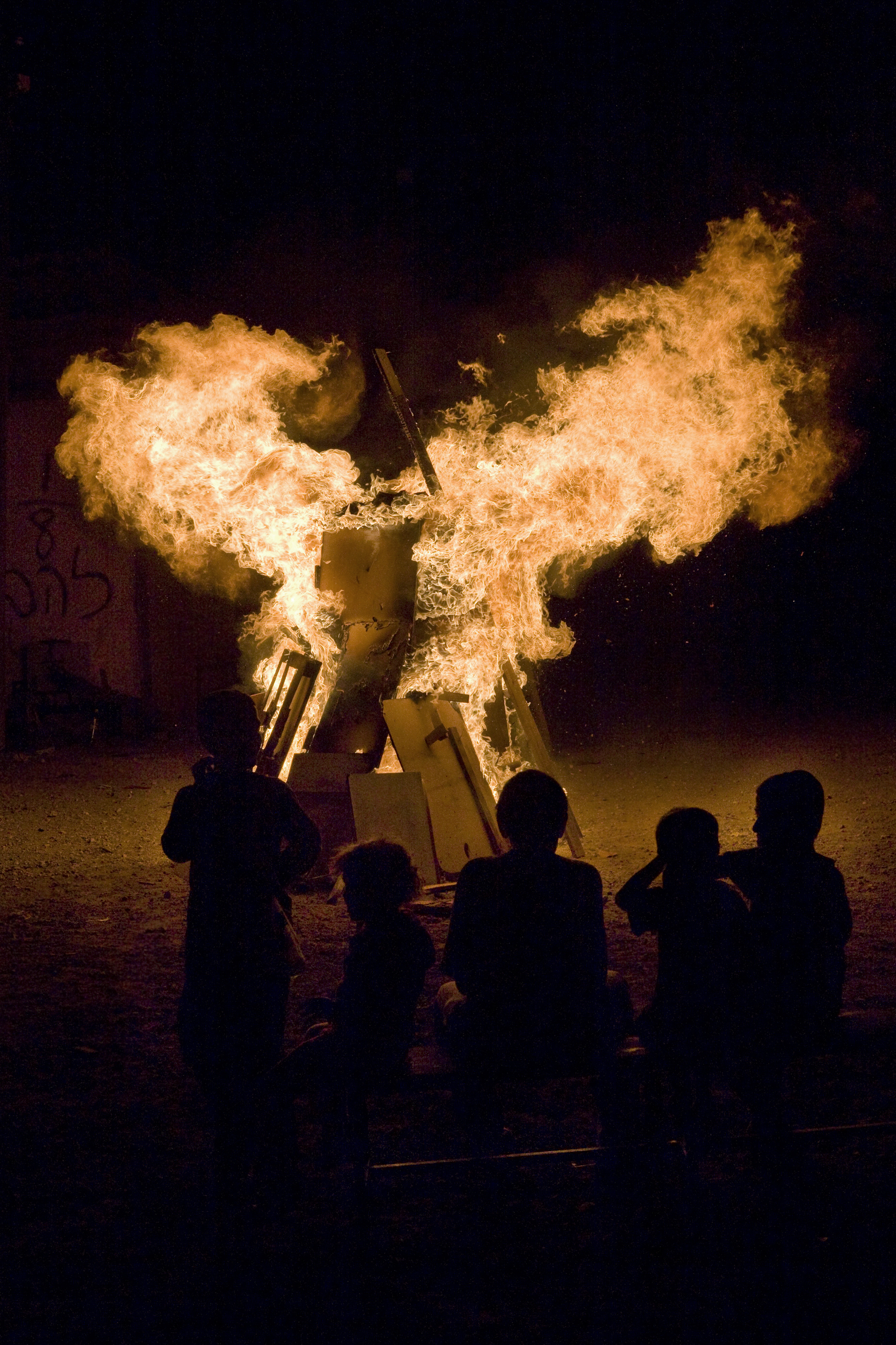
Children watch Lag BaOmer bonfire in Tel Aviv, Israel.

Lag BaOmer is Hebrew for "33rd [day] in the Omer". The letter ל (lamed) or "L" has the numerical value of 30 and ג (gimel) or "G" has the numerical value of three (see Hebrew numerals). A vowel sound is conventionally added for pronunciation purposes.

Some Jews call this holiday Lag LaOmer, which means "33rd [day] of the Omer", as opposed to Lag BaOmer, "33rd [day] in the Omer". Lag BaOmer is the traditional method of counting by some Ashkenazi and Hasidic Jews; Lag LaOmer is the count used by Sephardi Jews. Lag LaOmer is also the name used by Yosef Karo, who was a Sepharadi, in his Shulchan Aruch (Orach Chaim 493:2, and cf. 489:1 where BaOmer is inserted by Moses Isserles).

== Origins ==
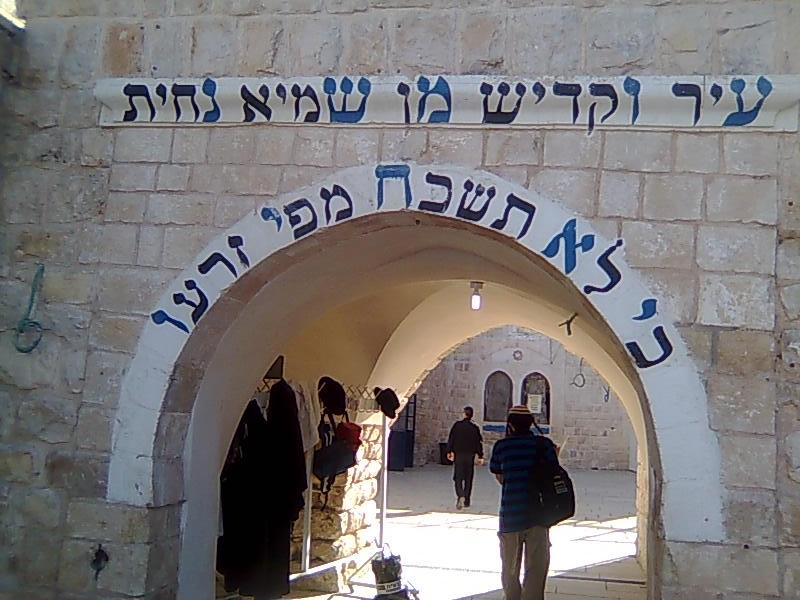
Entrance to the tomb of Shimon bar Yochai and his son, Eleazar

The origins of Lag BaOmer are unclear. The 18th of Iyar, corresponding to the date of Lag BaOmer, is first mentioned in a list of fasts on a Tel Rehov synagogue inscription dating to the 5th-7th century CE. It is theorized that this fast originated with the destruction of the in-construction Third Temple by the Galilee earthquake of 363, which occurred on this date. After the Muslim conquest and the end of Christian oppression of Jews in Israel, mourning practices ceased to be observed.

Another theory posits that the connection between Lag Baomer and Shimon bar Yochai arose from a general pilgrimage to Mount Meron on Pesach Sheini (15th of Iyar), specifically to Hillel's cave wherein water filled up the cave's cisterns and sometimes overflowed; the phenomenon was considered miraculous and attracted Jews and Muslims alike. As Hillel's cave is close to Mount Meron it was customary for the pilgrims to stop by the graves of other holy saints on Mount Meron, among them Shimon's tomb. During the 16th century, when the Ashkenazi community came to Safed, the pilgrimage naturally moved up to Lag Baomer (3 days later), already a joyous day according to Ashkenaz custom (Rema OC 493:2), as it was believed to be the day the plague of Rabbi Akiva's students ended. As one of the Rabbi Akiva's prominent students, Shimon's tomb became the focus of the pilgrimage.

The earliest reference to the observance of Lag BaOmer as a festival is in a gloss to Mahzor Vitry in BL Add MS 27,201 (f. 227v), if it is the work of Isaac ben Dorbolo. The gloss points out that Purim and Lag BaOmer always fall on the same day of the week, but says nothing about the origin of the holiday. (Note: וביום פורים הוא ל"ג בעומר וזכר . . . פורים ל"ג בעומר. Paralleled in MS Berlin 352, f. 11r: וביום פורים יארע ל"ג בעומר. These texts differ only in the mnemonic; Add MS 27,201 gives שם האחד פל"ג and MS Berlin פל"ג אלהים מלא מים. Similarly, a marginal note to MS BL Or. 9153, f. 165r reads פל"ג אלהים מלא מים נוטריקון ש[ל] פל"ג הפ' פורים הל"ג ר"ל ל"ג לעו[מר] כשיבא גשם בשניהם הוא סימן [של] שובע וגם שלעולם יהיה ל"ג ל[עומר] כיום פורים. The other mnemonics listed in these sources are thematic, but only MS Or. 9153 attempts to explain פל"ג in such terms. Cf. the Manhig שמעתי בשם ר' זרחיה הלוי ז"ל מגירונדה שמצא כתוב בספר ישן הבא מספרד שמתו מפסח ועד פרוס העצרת ומאי פורסא פלגא.) Abraham ben Nathan (citing Zerachiah haLevi of Girona), David ben Levi of Narbonne, MS ex-Montefiore 134, Levi ben Abraham ben Hayyim, Joshua ibn Shuaib (citing a "midrash") Menachem Meiri (citing "a tradition of the geonim"), and Judah Halawa (citing a "yerushalmi") are the first to name Lag BaOmer as the day on which the plague afflicting Rabbi Akiva's students ended, although this is said to explain a previously-existing custom to allow marriages between Lag baOmer and Shavuot. According to MS ex-Montefiore 134, it was traditional to let blood on Lag BaOmer in celebration.

The following anecdote occurred circa 1400:

The shamash's son ran to join [Yaakov Moelin]'s students in their Lag baOmer celebration, and an argument broke out between him and Rabbi Lemlin, the son of Rabbi Moses Neumark Katz. This youth called [Lemlin] 'pig's meat'! Word of the event came to our master [Yaakov Moelin], and he excommunicated the shamash's son, and he said 'How could you be permitted to call one of my students this?!' The youth sat excommunicated until the Monday after Lag baOmer. His family was greatly afflicted, as he was a member of the city elite, so he and his father went and publicly begged Moelin and his students for forgiveness, before the entire yeshiva of 50 people. And they were forgiven. This was the only time Moelin ever excommunicated a person.

Lag Baomer is said to be the day on which Shimon ben Yochai died. Neither Chazal nor the Rishonim mention that the date of his death was Lag Baomer; the first known appearance of this claim is in the Sabbatean Hemdat Yamim (1731), but it was later popularized by a misprinting of Hayyim Vital, which replaced שמחת רשב"י "the celebration of Rabbi Shimon ben Yochai" with שמת רשב"י "when Rabbi Shimon ben Yochai died".

The origin of kabbalistic traditions of visiting Meron on any of several dates in the month of Iyar date to the Middle Ages; but it is not clear when, by whom, or in what way Lag baOmer was first connected to Shimon ben Yochai.

Nachman Krochmal, a 19th-century Jewish scholar, suggests that the deaths of Rabbi Akiva's students was a veiled reference to the defeat of "Akiva's soldiers" by the Romans, and that Lag BaOmer was the day on which Bar Kokhba enjoyed a brief victory.

In pre-war Europe, Lag BaOmer became a special holiday for students and was called "Scholar's Day". Students were freed to engage in outdoor sports.

=== Kabbalistic significance ===
Lag BaOmer is also connected to the Kabbalistic custom of assigning a Sefirah to each day and week of the Omer count. The first week corresponds to Chesed, the second week to Gevurah, etc., and similarly, the first day of each week corresponds to Chesed, the second day to Gevurah, etc. Thus, the 33rd day, which is the fifth day of the fifth week, corresponds to Hod she-be-Hod (Splendor within [the week of] Splendor). As such, Lag BaOmer represents the level of spiritual manifestation or Hod that would precede the more physical manifestation of the 49th day (Malkhut she-be-Malkhut, Kingship within [the week of] Kingship), which immediately precedes the holiday of Shavuot.

== Customs and practices ==
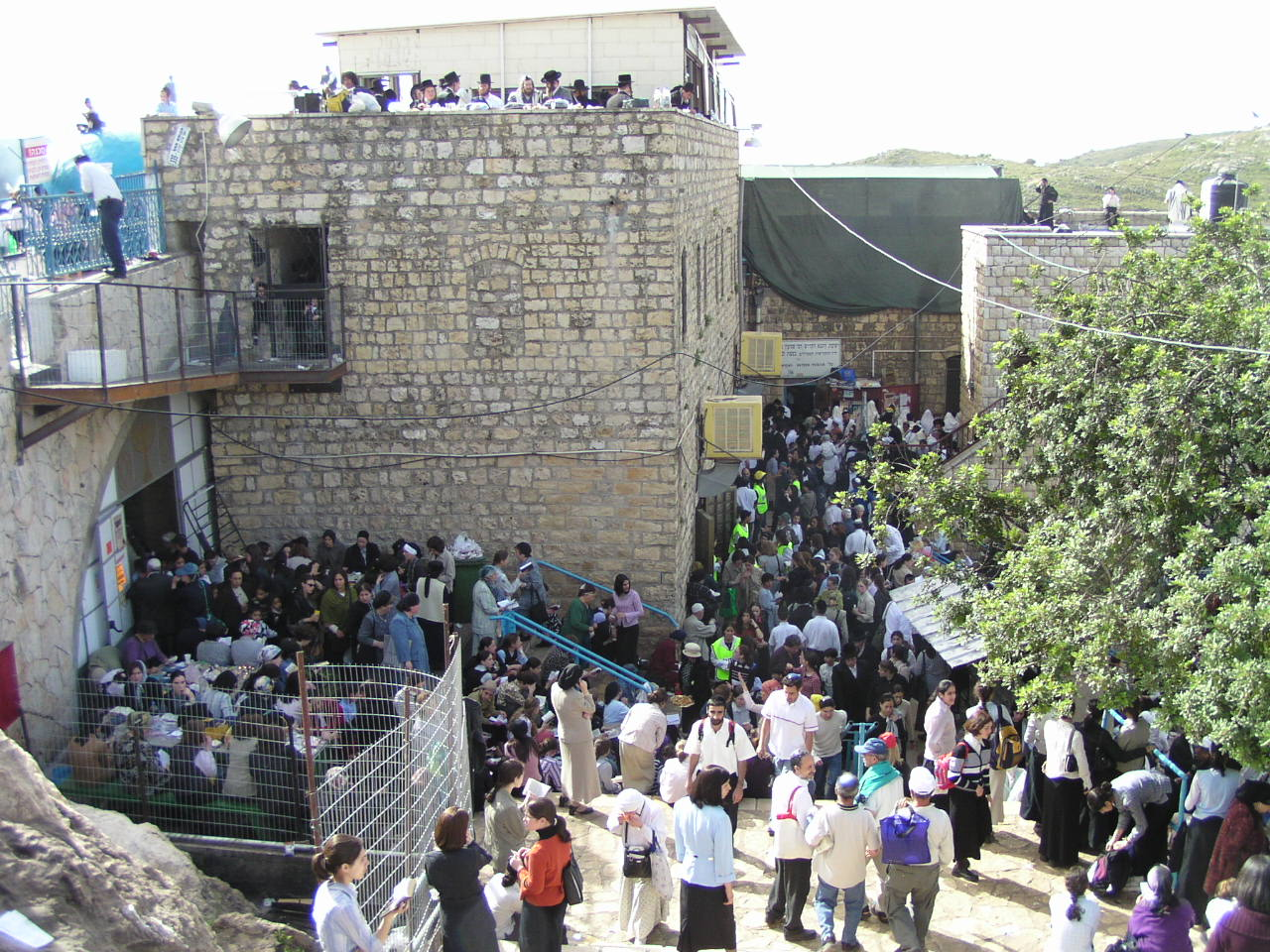
The tomb of Rabbi Shimon bar Yochai in Meron on Lag BaOmer

While the Counting of the Omer is a semi-mourning period, all restrictions of mourning are lifted for Ashkenazim on the 33rd day of the Omer. The Sephardic custom is to cease mourning the following day, celebrations being allowed on the 34th day of the Omer, Lad BaOmer (ל״ד בעומר). As a result, weddings, parties, listening to music, and haircuts are commonly scheduled to coincide with Lag BaOmer among Ashkenazi Jews, while Sephardi Jews hold weddings the next day. It is customary mainly among Hassidim that three-year-old boys be given their first haircuts (upsherin). While haircuts may be taken anywhere, if possible, the occasion is traditionally held at the tomb of Rabbi Shimon bar Yochai in Meron, Israel, or at the Jerusalem grave of Shimon Hatzaddik for those who cannot travel to Meron.

Families go on picnics and outings. Children go out to the fields with their teachers with bows and rubber-tipped arrows. Tachanun, the prayer for special Divine mercy on one's behalf, is not said on days with a festive character, including Lag BaOmer; when God is showing one a "smiling face", so to speak, as He does especially on the holidays, there is no need to ask for special mercy.

=== Bonfires ===
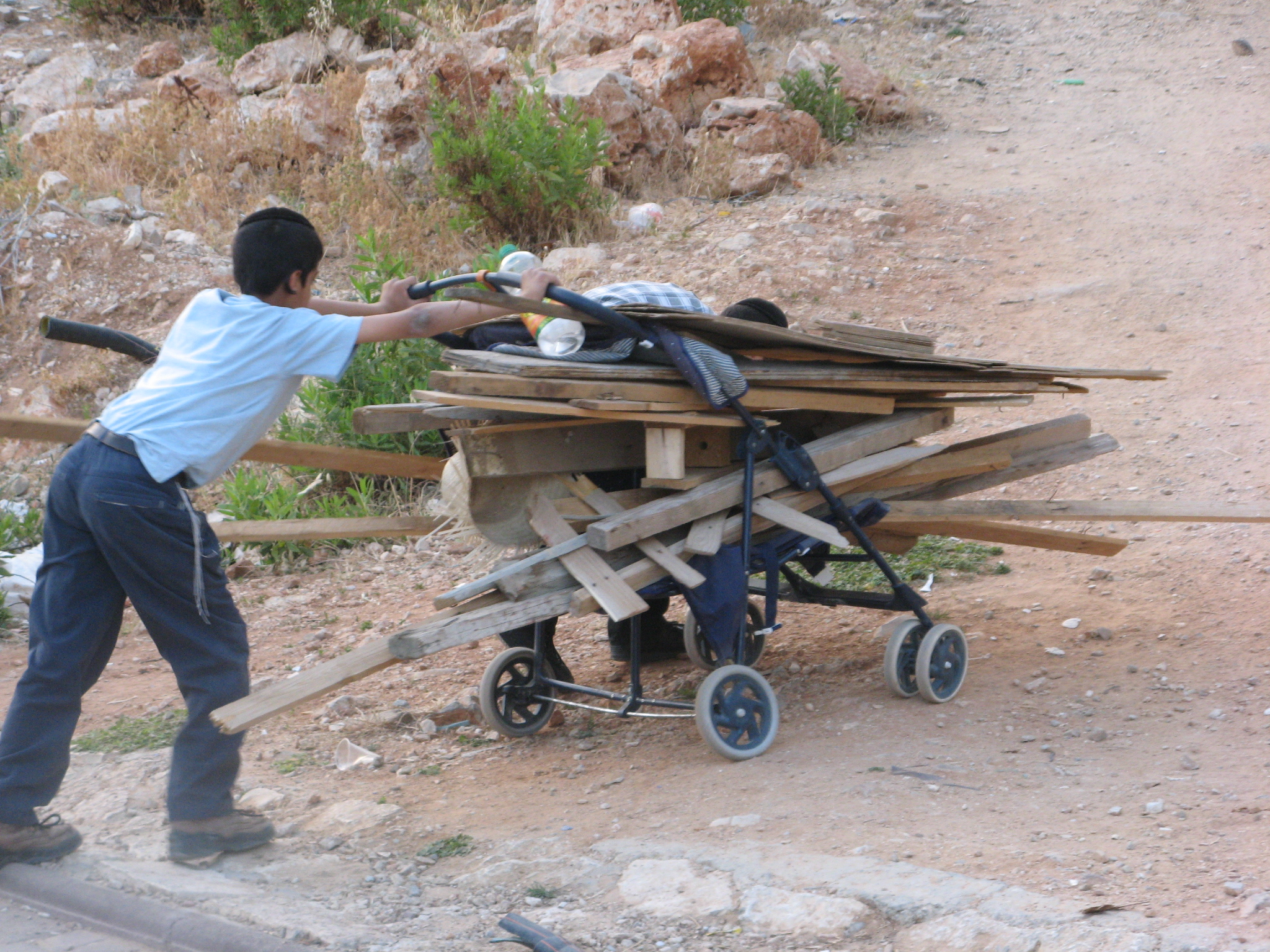
Israeli boys collect wood for a Lag BaOmer bonfire.

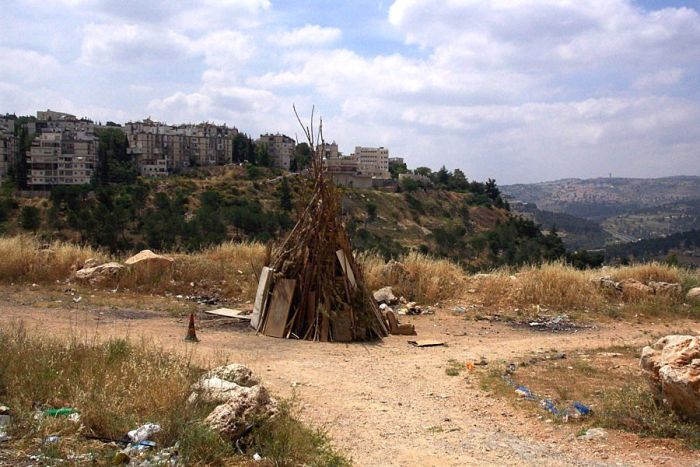
A wood pile awaiting Lag BaOmer celebration

The most widespread custom of Lag BaOmer is the lighting of bonfires, a practice that some Israelis object to because they say that the fires burning until late at the night increase air pollution. One explanation is that bonfires symbolize the "spiritual light" brought into the world by Simeon ben Yochai. Some draw a connection between the bonfires of Lag BaOmer and the festivals of May Day and Beltane celebrated in some European countries between the spring equinox and summer solstice on 1 May. In Germany, men go out in the woods to shoot arrows at demons on May Day, similar to how the bow and arrow is used on Lag BaOmer.

Throughout the world celebrants gather on the night and during the day of Lag BaOmer to light fires. A large celebration is held at the Tomb of Rabbi Shimon bar Yochai and his son Rabbi Eleazar in Meron, where hundreds of thousands usually celebrate with bonfires, torches, song, dancing and feasting. In 1983, Rabbi Levi Yitzchak Horowitz of Boston reinstated a century-old tradition among his Hasidim to light a bonfire at the grave of Rabbi Akiva in Tiberias on Lag BaOmer night. The tradition had been abandoned due to attacks on participants. After the bonfire, the Rebbe delivered a dvar Torah, gave blessings, and distributed shirayim. Later that same night, the Rebbe cut the hair of three-year-old boys for their Upsherin.

For many years, New York based Rabbi Aaron Teitelbaum of Satmar discouraged bonfires, saying it was not the custom to light them outside of the Land of Israel. However, when his father Rabbi Moses Teitelbaum instructed him to organize a large bonfire in the Satmar enclave of Kiryas Joel tens of thousands turned up.

The bonfires are said to represent the signal fires that the Bar Kokhba rebels lit on the mountaintops to relay messages, or are in remembrance of the Bar Kokhba revolt against the Romans, who had forbidden the kindling of fires that signalled the start of Jewish holidays.

Due to incidents involving teenagers who threw live animals in lag ba'omer bonfires, a group of Israelis with initiative took to patrolling the bonfires to prevent this cruel misbehavior.

=== Bows and arrows ===
A custom of playing with bows and arrows developed from a Midrash about the rainbow, according to which no rainbows were seen during Bar Yochai's lifetime, as his merit protected the world.

==== In Israel ====
In Israel, Lag BaOmer is a holiday for children and the various youth movements. It is also marked in the Israel Defense Forces as a week of the Gadna program (youth brigades) which were established on Lag BaOmer in 1941 and which bear the emblem of a bow and arrow.

=== Parades ===
The Lubavitcher Rebbe, Rabbi Menachem Mendel Schneerson, encouraged Lag BaOmer parades to be held in Jewish communities around the world as a demonstration of Jewish unity and pride. Chabad sponsors parades as well as rallies, bonfires and barbecues for thousands of participants around the world each year.

=== Songs ===
Several traditional songs are associated with the holiday; these are sung around bonfires, at weddings, and at tishen held by Hasidic Rebbes on Lag BaOmer. The popular song "Bar Yochai" was composed by Rabbi Shimon Lavi, a 16th-century kabbalist in Tripoli, Libya, in honor of Shimon Bar Yochai. Other songs include "Ve'Amartem Koh LeChai", a poem arranged as an alphabetical acrostic, and "Amar Rabbi Akiva".

=== Tish meal ===
Most Hasidic Rebbes conduct a tish on Lag BaOmer, in addition to or instead of a bonfire. A full meal is usually served, and candles are lit. It is traditional to sing "Bar Yochai", "Ve'Amartem Koh Lechai", and "Amar Rabbi Akiva". Among the Satmar Hasidim, "Tzama Lecha Nafshi" is sung at the tish in addition to the other songs. Teachings of Rabbi Shimon Bar Yochai, both from the Talmud and the Zohar, are generally expounded upon by Rebbes at their tishen. In some Hasidic courts, the Rebbe may shoot a toy bow and arrow during the tish, and three-year-old boys may be brought to have a lock of hair cut by the Rebbe as part of their first haircut.

== Rabbinic controversy ==
Some rabbis, namely Moses Sofer and Joseph Saul Nathansohn, have opposed the celebration of or the practice of certain customs observed on Lag BaOmer. These halachic scholars pointed out that the way Lag BaOmer is observed differs from the traditional manner in which anniversaries of deaths are observed, as Lag BaOmer is observed in a festive way, whereas usually a yahrtzeit is marked by observances that "bring out the solemn and serious nature of the day". Other issues raised include the practice of throwing clothes into bonfires, which is perceived as wasteful, the fact that the holiday has not been celebrated by earlier sages, and the prohibition of establishing holidays. Nevertheless, these authorities did not ban the holiday.

Other rabbis responded to the aforesaid opposition by explaining that it has been observed by many great rabbis and that expensive clothes are never burned. They relate what happened on the day of Rabbi Shimon bar Yochai's death as evidence that the day is very holy and should be celebrated. This has remained the opinion of most contemporary and recent rabbis.

== Zionism ==
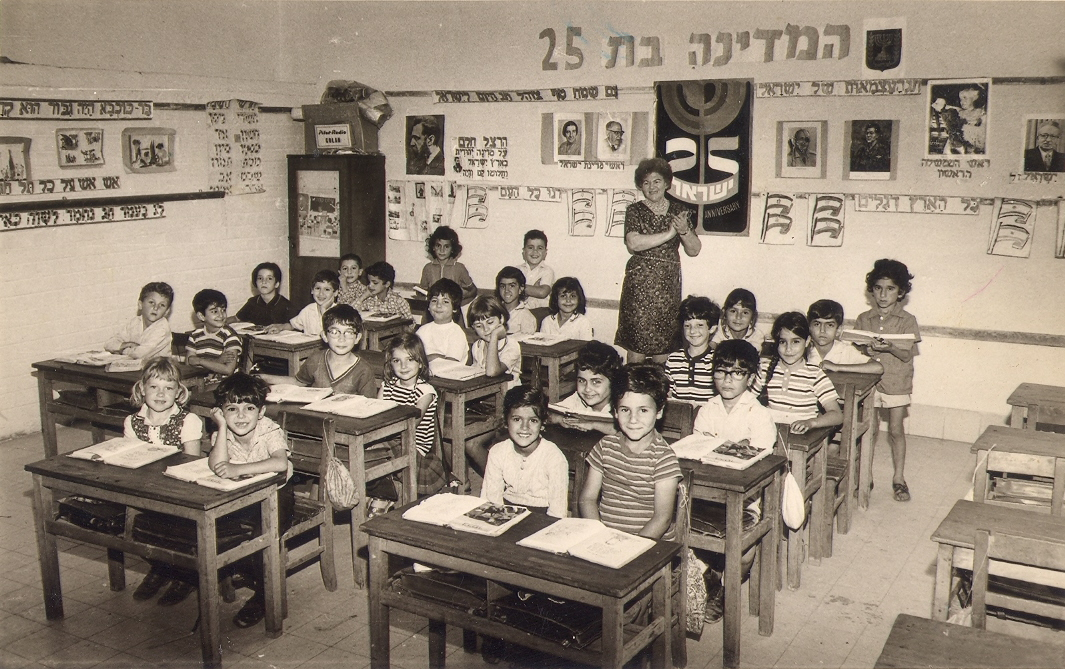
A first-grade classroom in Tel Aviv in 1973 with holiday displays; the Lag BaOmer display showing Bar Kokhba is on the left.

In modern Israel, early Zionists redefined Lag BaOmer from a rabbinic-oriented celebration to a commemoration of the Bar Kokhba revolt against the Roman Empire (132–136 CE). According to work published by Yael Zerubavel of Rutgers University, a number of Lag BaOmer traditions were reinterpreted by Zionist ideologues to focus on the victory of the Bar Kokhba rebels rather than their ultimate defeat at Betar three years later. The plague that decimated Rabbi Akiva's 24,000 disciples was explained as a veiled reference to the revolt; the 33rd day when the plague ended was explained as the day of Bar Kokhba's victory. By the late 1940s, Israeli textbooks for schoolchildren painted Bar Kokhba as the hero while Rabbi Shimon bar Yochai and Rabbi Akiva stood on the sidelines, cheering him on. This interpretation lent itself to singing and dancing around bonfires by night to celebrate Bar Kokhba's victory, and playing with bows and arrows by day to remember the actions of Bar Kokhba's rebel forces.

This interpretation of the holiday reinforced the Zionist reading of Jewish history and underscored their efforts to establish an independent Jewish state. As Benjamin Lau writes in Haaretz:

This is how Lag Ba'omer became a part of the Israeli-Zionist psyche during the first years of Zionism and Israel. A clear distinction became evident between Jews and Israelis in the way the day was celebrated: The religious Jews lit torches in Rashbi's [Shimon bar Yochai's] honor and sang songs about him, while young Israelis, sitting around an alternative bonfire, sang about a hero "whom the entire nation loved" and focused on the image of a powerful hero who galloped on a lion in his charges against the Romans.

In modern Israel, Lag BaOmer is "a symbol for the fighting Jewish spirit". The Palmach division of the Haganah was established on Lag BaOmer 1941, and the government order creating the Israel Defense Forces was issued on Lag BaOmer 1948. Beginning in 2004, the Israeli government designated Lag BaOmer as the day for saluting the IDF reserves.

== See also ==
- Hebrew numerals
- Sephirot, the 10 attributes/emanations found in Kabbalah.
- Significance of numbers in Judaism

== Sources ==
- Walter, Moshe (2018). The Making of a Minhag: The Laws and Parameters of Jewish Customs. Jerusalem: Feldheim Publishers. ISBN 9781680253368.
