= David ben Levi of Narbonne =

13th-century talmudist and author of Sefer haMichtam

Rabbi David ben Levi of Narbonne was a Talmudist of the late 13th century, best known as author of Sefer haMichtam.

Little is known of his life. He served as a judge in Narbonne alongside R' Mordechai Kimchi. His teacher (according to his work) was R' Shmuel ben Shlomo Sekili. He must have lived until at least 1305, as he records his teacher R' Shmuel dying in that year.

His work Sefer haMichtam is a halachic work based on Isaac Alfasi's rulings on the Talmud. It covers a number of tractates, particular in Seder Moed (Brachot, Pesachim, Rosh Hashana, Sukkah, Beitzah, Taanit, Megillah, and Moed Kattan). It is mentioned in the works of other rishonim who lived after him, among them Menachem Meiri, Orchot Chaim, the Kol Bo, and more. The book existed in manuscript for centuries, and was only printed in the 20th century.
