= Yehuda Liebes =

Israeli academic and scholar (born 1947)

Professor Emeritus Yehuda Liebes
- יהודה ליבס
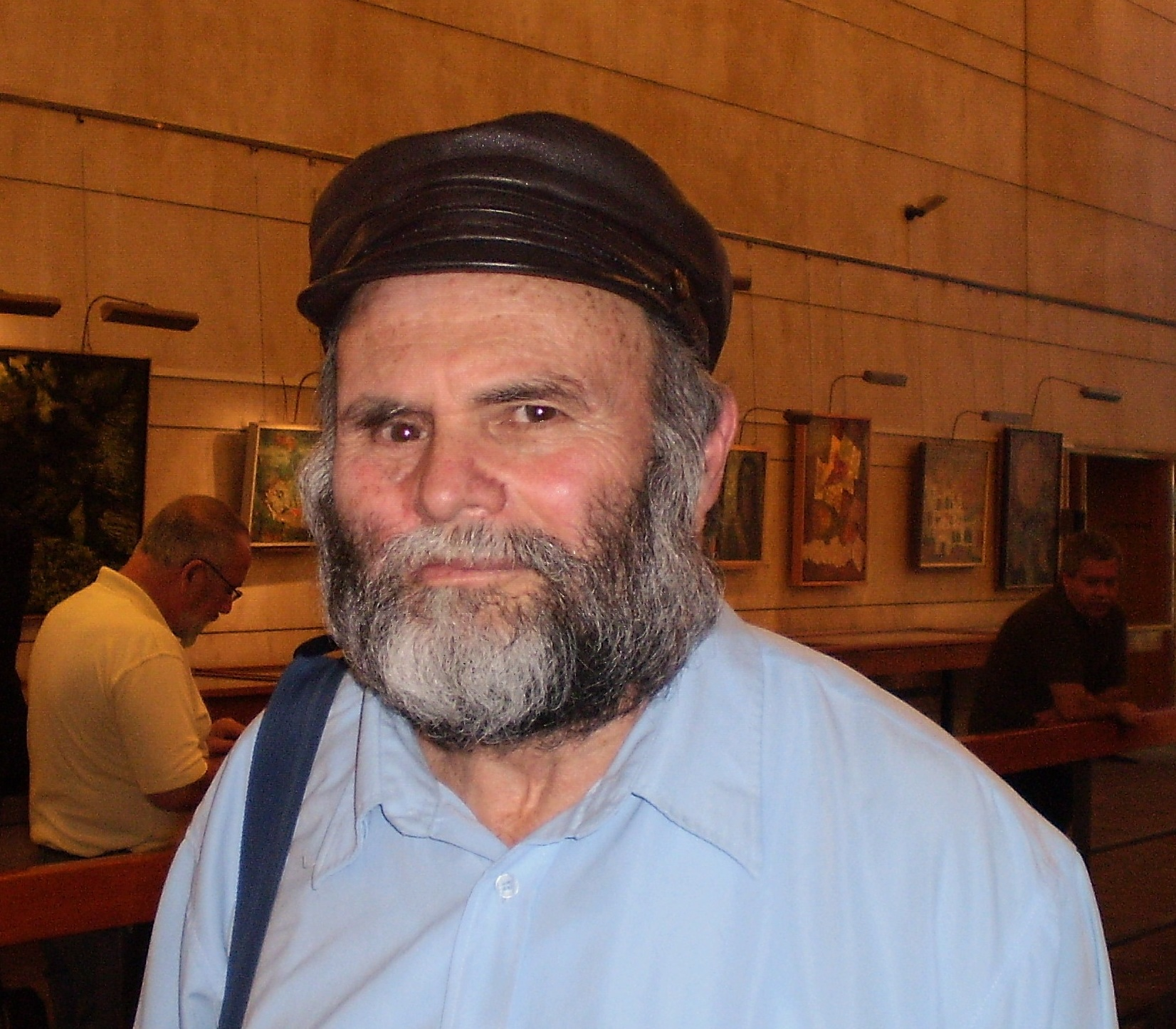
- Liebes in 2012
- Born: 1947 (age 78–79); Jerusalem, Mandatory Palestine
- Known for: Kabbalah scholarship
- Spouse: Esther
- Children: 3
- Awards: Israel Prize (2017)

Academic background
- Education: PhD, Hebrew University of Jerusalem, 1976
- Thesis: Peraḳim be-milon sefer ha-Zohar (Chapters in the Dictionary of the Book of the Zohar) (1976)
- Doctoral advisor: Gershom Scholem

Academic work
- Institutions: Hebrew University of Jerusalem
- Main interests: Kabbalah, Zohar, Jewish myth, Sabbateanism
- Website: http://liebes.huji.ac.il/

Yehuda Liebes (Hebrew: יהודה ליבס; born 1947) is an Israeli academic and scholar. He is the Gershom Scholem Professor Emeritus of Kabbalah at the Hebrew University of Jerusalem. Considered a leading scholar of Kabbalah, his research interests also include Jewish myth, Sabbateanism, and the links between Judaism and ancient Greek religion, Christianity, and Islam. He is the recipient of the 1997 Bialik Prize, the 1999 Gershom Scholem Prize for Kabbalah Research, the 2006 EMET Prize for Art, Science and Culture, and the 2017 Israel Prize in Jewish thought.

== Biography ==
Yehuda Liebes was born in Jerusalem. His father, Joseph Gerhard Liebes (1910–1988), a noted Hebrew translator of classic literature, left his native Germany at the age of 18 to study at the Hebrew University of Jerusalem. He returned to his homeland to continue his education, but was expelled from his university due to the Nuremberg Laws. He then undertook agricultural training in Latvia with a Zionist movement. There he married his first wife, with whom he settled in Pardes Hanna in Mandatory Palestine and had two daughters before they divorced. In 1941 Liebes married his second wife, Mira, a native of Riga who had grown up in Berlin. They had two children, a daughter (Tamar, today head of the Department of Communications at Hebrew University) and a son (Yehuda). On his mother's side, Liebes was a cousin of Israeli intellectual Yeshayahu Leibowitz.

Liebes was acquainted with Gershom Scholem, the father of modern Kabbalah scholarship, from an early age, as his parents were friends of Scholem. Scholem attended Yehuda's Bar Mitzvah and gave him as a gift Yeshayahu Tishby's book Mishnat HaZohar ("The Wisdom of the Zohar").

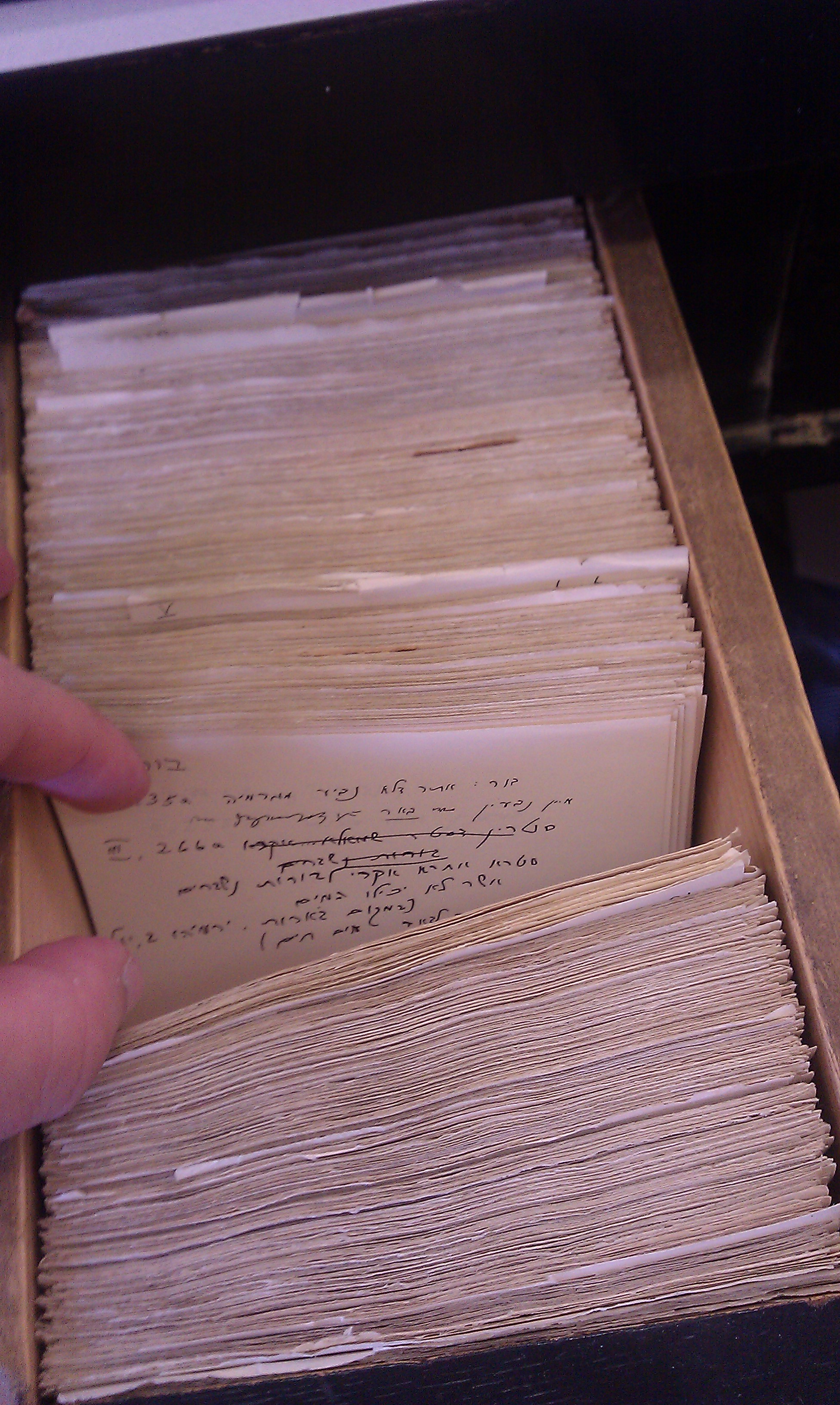
Gershom Scholem's card catalog

Liebes graduated from the Hebrew University Secondary School. In 1965, he enlisted in the Paratroopers Brigade for his compulsory army service, and in 1967, served in the Six-Day War as a non-commissioned officer. During reserve duty in 1969, he was injured during a Palestinian attack on his post in the Jordan Valley, lost several teeth, and was hospitalized for several months.

In 1967, Liebes began his studies at the Hebrew University of Jerusalem. After earning undergraduate and graduate degrees, he pursued his doctoral research under Scholem. Scholem gave Liebes access to handwritten note cards he had prepared for a lexicon of Zohar terminology that he never wrote, and Liebes submitted his dissertation on Peraḳim be-milon sefer ha-Zohar (Chapters in the Dictionary of the Book of the Zohar) (1976).

Liebes and his wife, Dr. Esther Liebes, have three children. In 1977, after he completed his doctorate, they joined the nucleus of the new Israeli settlement of Shilo in the West Bank, living in a caravan near Ofra, but left after nine months. The couple resides in the Kiryat Moshe neighborhood of Jerusalem. Esther, a scholar of Hasidism, formerly worked as the director of the Gershom Scholem Collection for Kabbalah and Hasidism at the National Library of Israel. She edited some of the works of Gershom Scholem.

Liebes identifies politically with the right wing of Israeli politics and religiously with Religious Zionism.

== Academic career ==
Liebes began lecturing in the Hebrew University's Department of Jewish Thought in 1971. He became a full professor in 1993. His course subjects include Kabbalah, Jewish myth, and the Zohar. He has also taught on Zohar at the University of Chicago.

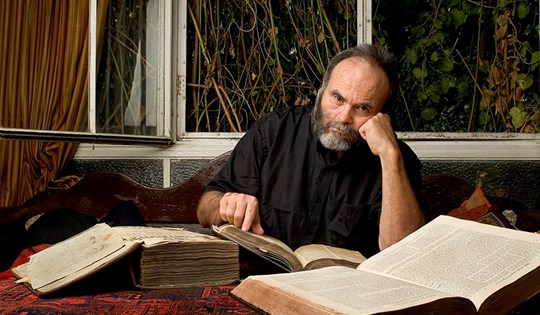
Liebes in 2006

I do not really like the term 'Jewish mysticism'. The order of the words is not correct. You have to say 'mystical Judaism', because Kabbalah is first and foremost an interpretation of an aspect of the Jewish religion. … The inclusion of all mystical phenomena under the heading 'mysticism' is a mistake, because it causes people to think everything is the same—Christian mysticism, Jewish mysticism, Muslim mysticism. The Kabbalah is an interpretation of the Jewish religion, of Torah and mitzvot, of the people and the land of Israel".

— Yehuda Liebes, 2017

Liebes is considered a leading scholar of Kabbalah. His work is said to be representative of "the Hebrew University's new wave of kabbalistic research". Liebes explores the mythic and messianic dimensions in Judaism and Kabbalah, and Christian and Sabbatean influences on Kabbalah. He has written extensively on "the Zohar, Lurianic Kabbalah, Sabbateanism, Breslov Hasidism and the Gaon of Vilna and his disciples". He studies the links between Judaism and ancient Greek religion, Christianity, and Islam. His work is often cited by scholars.

Liebes has also translated Greek, Latin, and Arabic religious poetry into Hebrew.

== Views and opinions ==
Challenging the traditional ascription of the Zohar to the 2nd-century disciples of Shimon bar Yochai in Israel, Liebes asserts that a group of 13th-century Spanish Kabbalists, which included Moses de León, composed the work, each reflecting his own approach to Kabbalah. Liebes claims that the Ketem Paz on the Zohar and the Kabbalistic hymn Bar Yochai were written by two different authors with similar names, not the one Shimon Lavi who is traditionally credited with authoring both works. Liebes also finds Christian and Sabbatean inspiration in the ideas of Rebbe Nachman of Breslov and, at the same time, Sabbatean influences on the disciples of the Vilna Gaon who opposed Hasidism.

Liebes angered National Religious Jews in Israel when he claimed to find a Christian allusion in the Amidah, the central prayer of the Jewish liturgy. Liebes asserted that the conclusion of the 14th blessing, "keren yeshua" ("horn of salvation") refers not to David, but to Jesus (Yeshua in Hebrew).

Liebes publishes in Hebrew and has expressed opposition to the study of Jewish thought in English. He has allowed only a few of his works to be translated into English, in conjunction with his academic degree and tenure.

== Awards and recognition ==
Liebes received the 1997 Bialik Prize for his book The Secret of the Sabbatean Faith (1995). In 1999 he received the Peace Prize for the study of Kabbalah and the Gershom Scholem Prize for Kabbalah Research. He was awarded the 2006 EMET Prize for Art, Science and Culture, in the category of Humanities, for his work on Sabbateanism. In 2017 he received the Israel Prize for his work on Kabbalah and Jewish mysticism.

- וזאת ליהודה: קובץ מאמרים המוקדש לחברנו, פרופ׳ יהודה ליבס, לרגל יום הולדתו השישים וחמישה [And This to Yehuda: A collection of articles dedicated to our friend Professor Yehuda Liebes on the occasion of his sixty-fifth birthday] (in Hebrew). Mosad Bialiḳ. 2012.

== Published works ==
- חטאו של אלישע: ארבעה שנכנסו לפרדס וטבעה של המיסטיקה התלמודית [The Sin of Elisha: Four Entered the Orchard and the Nature of Talmudic Mysticism] (in Hebrew). Hebrew University of Jerusalem. 1986.
- מחקרי שבתאות [Sabbatean Studies] (in Hebrew). Am Oved. 1991. (with Gershom Scholem)
- סוד האמונה השבתאית: קובץ מאמרים [The Secret of the Sabbatean Faith: A Collection of Articles] (in Hebrew). Mosad Byaliḳ. 1995.
- תורת היצירה של ספר היצירה [The Creative Theory of the Book of Creation] (in Hebrew). Tel Aviv. 2000.
- עלילות אלהים: המיתוס היהודי, מסות ומחקרים [The Words of God: The Jewish Myth, Essays and Studies] (in Hebrew). Karmel. 2008.
- פולחן השחר: יחס הזוהר לעבודה זרה [The Cult of the Dawn: The Attitude of the Zohar Towards Idolatry] (in Hebrew). Karmel. 2011.
- Studies in Jewish Myth and Messianism. SUNY Press. 2012. ISBN 978-1438410852.
- Studies in the Zohar. SUNY Press. 2012. ISBN 978-1438410845.
- לצבי ולגאון: משבתי צבי אל הגאון מווילנא : קובץ מחקרים [To Tsvi and the Gaon: From Shabbetai Tsvi to the Gaon of Vilna: A collection of studies] (in Hebrew). Idra. 2017.
