= Robert Devreesse =

French priest

- Born: 24 May 1894; Cisai-Saint-Aubin
- Died: August 16, 1978 (aged 84); Orville
- Occupation: priest

Robert Devreesse (28 May 1894, Cisai-Saint-Aubin – 1978 Orville) was a French priest and scriptor in the Vatican Library. His many works involve ground-breaking achievement in Greek (and also in Syriac) palaeography, research into the life and work of Theodore of Mopsuestia and the history of the Patriarchate of Antioch in its early centuries.

During World War II, he was irregularly appointed provisional curator of the Manuscripts department of the Bibliothèque Nationale; he was therefore fired in August 1944. After WWII, he was Vice-Prefect of the Vatican Library until 1950.

== Bibliography ==
- Le Commentaire de Théodore de Mopsueste sur les psaumes I-LXXX, 1939.
- Introduction à l'étude des manuscrits grecs, 1954.
- Le Patriarcat d'Antioche; Depuis la paix de l'Eglise jusqu' à la conquête arabe, 1945.
- Le Fonds Coislin, Catalogue des manuscrits grecs II, Paris 1945.
- Essai sur Théodore de Mopsueste (Studi e Testi 141), 1948.
- Les manuscrits grecs de l'Italie méridionale, histoire, classement, paléographie, 1955.
- Les évangiles et l'Evangile, 1966.
- Les anciens commentateurs grecs des psaumes,1970.
