= Isaac ben Dorbolo =

Isaac ben Dorbolo (Hebrew: יצחק ב"ר דורבלו/ן) was a rabbi, about 1150.

He traveled much, and knew France, Germany, Bohemia, Moravia, Poland and Russia from his own observations. Some time after 1140 he visited Rabbeinu Tam in Ramerupt.

In Worms, where he remained for some time, he reports having seen a responsum from the rabbis of Ereṣ Yisrāʾel in answer to a question addressed to them in 960 (at the time of Emperor Otto I) by the Rhenish rabbis concerning the reported appearance of the Messiah. Though this responsum is mentioned in different sources, its historical character has been questioned.

Isaac is mainly known through his additions to Maḥzor Vitry, although did not compile the Machzor as Charles Taylor supposed. These additions are indicated either by the author's full name or by a simple ת (= Tosefet), and appear in MS BL 27,200–27,201, the manuscript on which all modern editions are based. He often appends his name to such additions; and in one place he says plainly: "These explanations were added by me, Isaac b. Dorbolo; but the following is from the Machzor of R. Simchah of Vitry himself".

One of his particular entries to the Machzor Vitry is of great historical value to the Jewish Community of Olomouc in Moravia, as it is the first ever certain record of Jews in that city. Around 1140, the Jews and their medieval Jewish quarter are mentioned by Isaac as "Olmijz". During his stay, he witnessed an unusual funeral ceremony of the local Jewry, previously known to him only from Paris: the pulling out of grass while reciting the Psalm 72:16: "The inhabitants of the cities shall flourish like grass of the earth." An important observation sheds light on the origin of the Olomouc Jews: they almost certainly came from Western Europe, and most likely after the massacres of the First Crusade.

According to Leopold Zunz, Isaac's father is identical with the correspondent of Rashi and the martyr of the First Crusade of the same name; but this is chronologically impossible. Rapoport wrongly connected Isaac with Isaac of Ourville, author of the lost Sefer ha-Menahel; and Solomon Marcus Schiller-Szinessy, with Isaac of Russia.

Isaac is also cited in MS Montefiore 134 (f. 40v, 101v [later hand?]), in Minhagim asher Yaga'ti uMatzati (MS Vienna hebr. 12a, f 312r), in Shibbolei haLeket (Hilkhos Tefillin 2, 16), and perhaps in Kol Bo (an "Isaac" is quoted several times about tefillin in #21).
