= Shimon Lavi =

Libyan Jewish scholar (1486–1585)

Hakham Shimon Lavi
- Title page of Ketem Paz, Part I, by Hakham Shimon Lavi

Personal life
- Born: Shimon Lavi; 1486 Spain
- Died: 1585 (aged 98–99) Tripoli, Libya
- Buried: Tripoli

Religious life
- Religion: Judaism

Jewish leader
- Position: Dayan (rabbinical court judge)
- Organisation: Tripoli rabbinical court
- Began: 1549
- Ended: 1585
- Yahrtzeit: 15 Av 5345

Shimon Lavi (Hebrew: שמעון לביא, also Shimon ibn Lavi, Hebrew: שמעון אבן לביא, (Note: The variations in the spelling of his name and his extremely long lifespan have led some researchers, among them Professor Yehuda Liebes of Hebrew University of Jerusalem, to postulate that there were two similarly-named Lavis: the "Shimon Lavi" who was expelled from Spain in 1492 and composed the kabbalistic hymn "Bar Yochai" and other piyuttim, and the "Shimon ibn Lavi" who authored the Ketem Paz.) anglicized as Simeon Labi, 1486–1585) (Note: According to an unpublished manuscript by Rabbi Abraham Khalfon, Lavi died in 1580.) was a Sephardi Hakham, kabbalist, physician, astronomer, and poet. He is credited with the founding of religious institutions and the revival of Torah study in Tripoli, Libya, in the mid-sixteenth century, where he served as spiritual leader and dayan (rabbinical court judge) for more than three decades. He authored a commentary on the Zohar titled Ketem Paz and the piyyut, "Bar Yochai", a kabbalistic hymn which became widely popular in the Jewish world. Libyan Jews consider him their greatest scholar.

== Biography ==
As a child, Lavi was expelled from his homeland of Spain together with his family in the Spanish Expulsion of 1492. They resettled in Fez, Morocco, where Lavi studied both Torah and Kabbalah. In 1549 Lavi set out to immigrate to Israel, but was kidnapped and held for ransom by "Arab bandits". He was redeemed and came to Tripoli, where he found the community lacking spiritual guidance and decided to settle there instead.

Lavi is credited with the founding of the Tripoli Jewish community's religious institutions, the revival of Torah study, and the establishment of takkanot (Jewish community regulations). Serving as a posek and dayan (rabbinical court judge), Lavi put the rabbinical court on a firm footing and appointed more judges to lead the community into the future. In later generations, Tripoli Jews had the custom of reciting a memorial prayer every Yom Kippur eve on behalf of all the judges who had served on the rabbinical court from Lavi's time to the present. Lavi's efforts to revive Torah education also halted the spiritual decline among Tripoli Jewry; 300 years after his death, eleven rabbinical academies were operating in the city. Libyan Jews consider Lavi their greatest scholar.

An outstanding kabbalist, Lavi incorporated the study of Jewish mystical texts into the community's daily ritual. The Zohar took its place as a holy book alongside the Tanakh and Talmud, with people reading from it on weekdays, Shabbats, and at special social gatherings. Lavi fixed the prayer rite in Tripoli according to the Sephardi custom. His piyyut, "Bar Yochai", was sung every Friday night by Tripoli Jews to the melody that Lavi himself composed. Lavi also served as a physician to the Turkish governor and represented the Jewish community to the ruling authorities. He was said to be highly respected by the government ministers.

== Works ==
=== Ketem Paz ===
Around 1570 Lavi authored a commentary on the Zohar (Books of Genesis and Exodus). The commentary was noted for its emphasis on the peshat (direct meaning) of the Zohar text rather than on derush (comparative analysis). In addition to his kabbalistic discussion, Lavi displayed knowledge of alchemy. The manuscript remained in handwritten form until 1795, when wealthy Tripoli Jews arranged for the publication of the commentary for the Book of Genesis only, in two parts. The title of this work, Ketem Paz, was chosen by the Chida, who was in Livorno while the work was being printed there.

Additionally, Lavi wrote the commentary Bi'ur Millot Zarot she'b'Sefer HaZohar (Explanation of Foreign Words in the Book of the Zohar), which displays his mastery of Spanish and Arabic. This work was published in Yad Ne'eman (1804) by Rabbi Avraham Miranda. Lavi also wrote the Seder Tikkunei Kallah, readings for Shavuot night (Venice, 1680).

=== "Bar Yochai" ===
Lavi composed numerous piyyutim, the most well-known of which is "Bar Yochai", written in praise of Rabbi Shimon bar Yochai, author of the Zohar. This composition displays Lavi's mastery of Torah and Kabbalah, as the rhyming stanzas incorporate expressions from the Tanakh, rabbinical teachings and ideas, and expressions from the Zohar and other mystical texts. The first letter of each stanza forms an acrostic of the author's name.

Lavi sang the song both in Hebrew and in a Judeo-Arabic translation. The song was brought to Safed, Palestine, and was accepted by the students of the Arizal, who in turn brought it to Europe. It was first printed at the beginning of the seventeenth century in Prague and Kraków. In the 1795 printing of Ketem Paz, this and other compositions by Lavi were included. The song became widely popular in the Jewish world. Customs vary regarding singing the song on the Shabbat, but all communities, Sephardi and Ashkenazi alike, sing it on Lag BaOmer, the Yom Hillula of Shimon bar Yochai.

== Tomb ==
Lavi's tomb in Tripoli was visited by Jewish pilgrims from throughout Libya both during the year and on his Yom Hillula. The tomb was also venerated by Muslims, who called him "Ibn Limam".

== Sources ==
- Ben-Ami, Issachar (1993). "Saint Veneration Among North African Jews". Jewish Folklore and Ethnology Review. 15 (2).
- Bet ha-tefutsot (1980). Libya, an extinct Jewish community. HaBayit.
- Carmi, T. (2006). The Penguin Book of Hebrew Verse. Penguin UK. ISBN 0141966602.
- Goldberg, Harvey E. (1996), "Communal Organization of the Jews of Tripolitania during the Late Ottoman Period", in Deshen, Shlomo; Zenner, Walter P. (eds.), Jews Among Muslims: Communities in the Precolonial Middle East, NYU Press, ISBN 0814796761
- Patai, Raphael (2014). The Jewish Alchemists: A History and Source Book. Princeton University Press. ISBN 978-1400863662.
- Scholem, Gershom (2006). Alchemy and Kabbalah. Spring Publications. ISBN 0882145665.
