= André Souvré =

French basketball player (1939–2021)

Personal information
- Born: 20 January 1939 Le Sap, France
- Died: 15 December 2021 (aged 82) Toulouse
- Listed height: 6 ft 2 in (1.88 m)

Career information
- Playing career: 1955–1973
- Positions: Shooting guard Small forward
- Number: 8

Career history
- 1955–1958: Amicale de Gallardon
- 1958–1966: Paris UC
- 1966–1970: TUC
- 1973: AS Tournefeuille

Career highlights
- Nationale Champion (1963); Winner of the French Basketball Cup (1962, 1963)

André Souvré (20 January 1939 – 15 December 2021) was a French basketball player. Notably, he was the father of Yannick Souvré. He appeared in eight games for the France national team. He died on 14 December 2021, at the age of 82.
