= Le Sap =

- Part of Sap-en-Auge
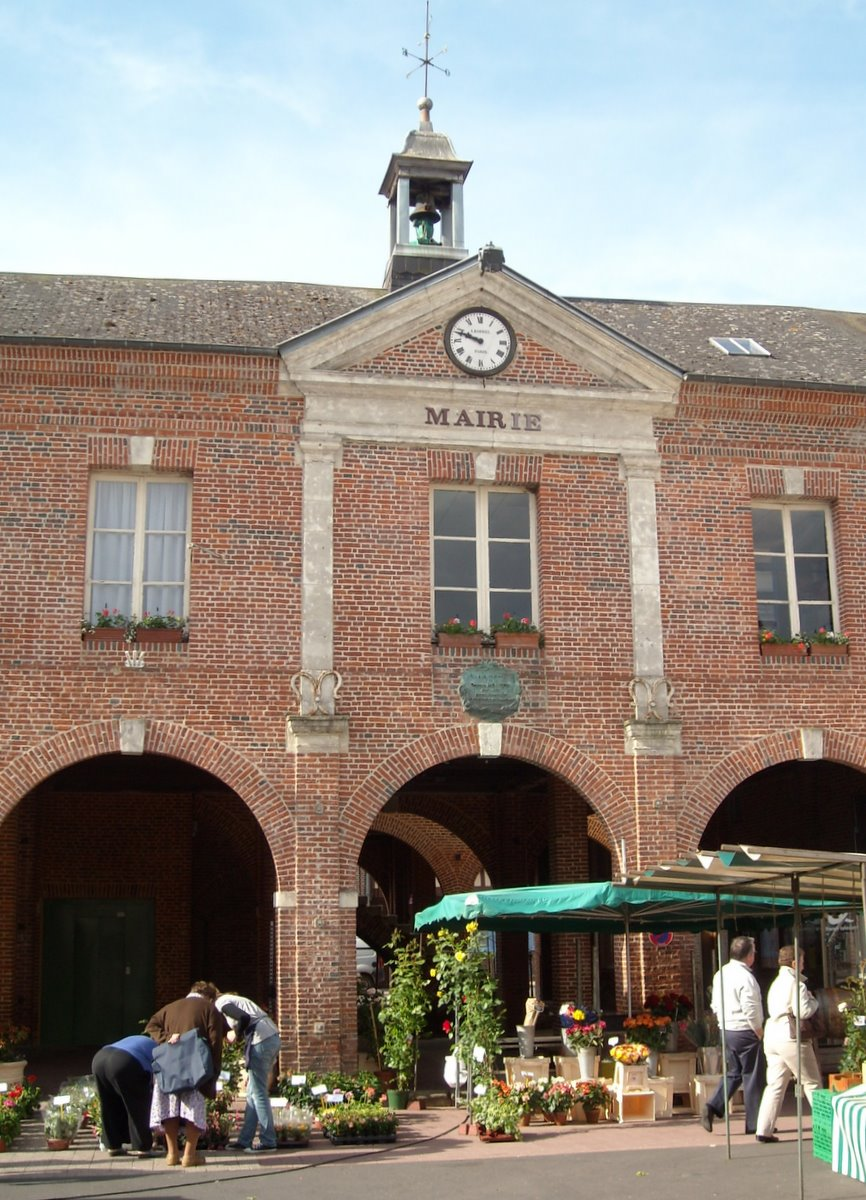
- La mairie

- Coat of arms
- Location of Le Sap
- Location within France Location within Normandy
- Coordinates: 48°53′42″N 0°20′22″E
- Country: France
- Region: Normandy
- Department: Orne
- Arrondissement: Mortagne-au-Perche
- Canton: Vimoutiers
- Commune: Sap-en-Auge
- Area^{1}: 22.73 km^{2} (8.78 sq mi)
- Elevation: 240 m (790 ft)
- Highest elevation: 272 m (892 ft)
- Lowest elevation: 180 m (590 ft)
- Population (2022): 832
  - Density: 36.6/km^{2} (94.8/sq mi)
- Demonym: Sapiens
- Time zone: UTC+01:00 (CET)
  - Summer (DST): UTC+02:00 (CEST)
- Postal code: 61470
- ^{1} French Land Register data, which excludes lakes, ponds, glaciers > 1 km^{2} (0.386 sq mi or 247 acres) and river estuaries.

Le Sap (French pronunciation: [lə sap]) is a former commune in the Orne department in north-western France. It is classed as a Petites Cités de Caractère. On 1 January 2016, it was merged into the new commune of Sap-en-Auge.

== Heraldry ==
Arms of Le Sap	The arms of Le Sap are blazoned: Lozengy argent and orange.

== See also ==
- Communes of the Orne department
