= Sap-en-Auge =

- Commune
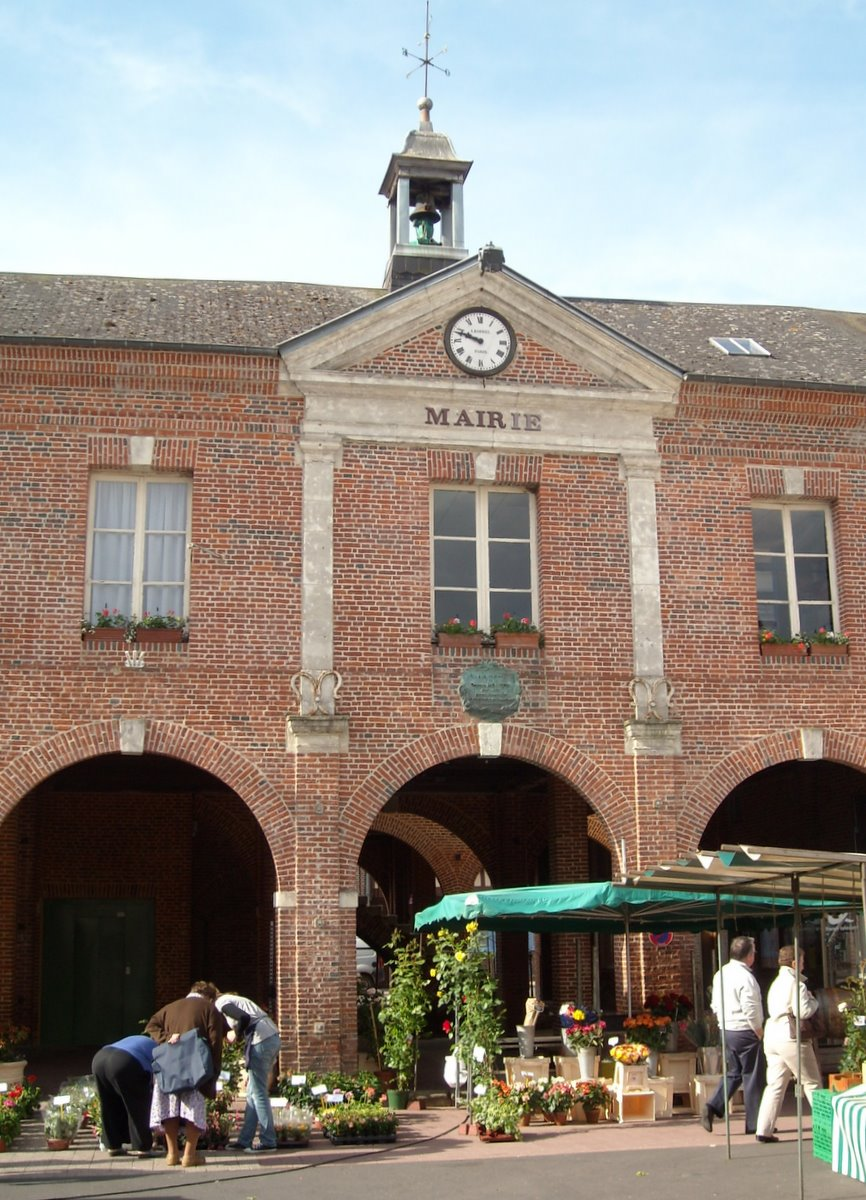
- The town hall in Le Sap
- Location of Sap-en-Auge
- Location within France Location within Normandy
- Coordinates: 48°53′38″N 0°20′17″E
- Country: France
- Region: Normandy
- Department: Orne
- Arrondissement: Mortagne-au-Perche
- Canton: Vimoutiers
- Intercommunality: Vallées d'Auge et du Merlerault

Government
  - Mayor (2020–2026): Gérard Rosé
- Area^{1}: 29.98 km^{2} (11.58 sq mi)
- Population (2023): 926
  - Density: 30.9/km^{2} (80.0/sq mi)
- Time zone: UTC+01:00 (CET)
  - Summer (DST): UTC+02:00 (CEST)
- INSEE/Postal code: 61460 /61470, 61120
- ^{1} French Land Register data, which excludes lakes, ponds, glaciers > 1 km^{2} (0.386 sq mi or 247 acres) and river estuaries.

Sap-en-Auge (French pronunciation: [sap ɑ̃.n‿oʒ], literally Sap in Auge) is a commune in the department of Orne, northwestern France. The municipality was established on 1 January 2016 by merger of the former communes of Orville and Le Sap (the seat). Its seat, Le Sap, is classed as a Petite Cité de Caractère.

== Geography ==
The commune along with another 11 communes shares part of a 1,400 hectare, Natura 2000 conservation area, called the Haute Vallée de la Touques et affluents.

The Touques river along with a stream, Ruisseau de la Bigotiere flow through the commune.

== Notable buildings and places ==
Ecomusée du Grand Jardin is a museum dedicated to the making of cider and Calvados.

=== National heritage sites ===
- Saint-Pierre Church a thirteenth century church, it was registered as a Monument historique in 1979.

== Sport ==
- Hippodrome de la Fontaine - Is a Race course that every August has a Harness racing event every August.

== Notable people ==
- Robert Devreesse (1894 - 1978) a French priest and scriptor in the Vatican Library died here.
- André Souvré - (1939 – 2021) a French basketball player, was born here.

== See also ==
- Communes of the Orne department
