= Cisai-Saint-Aubin =

- Commune
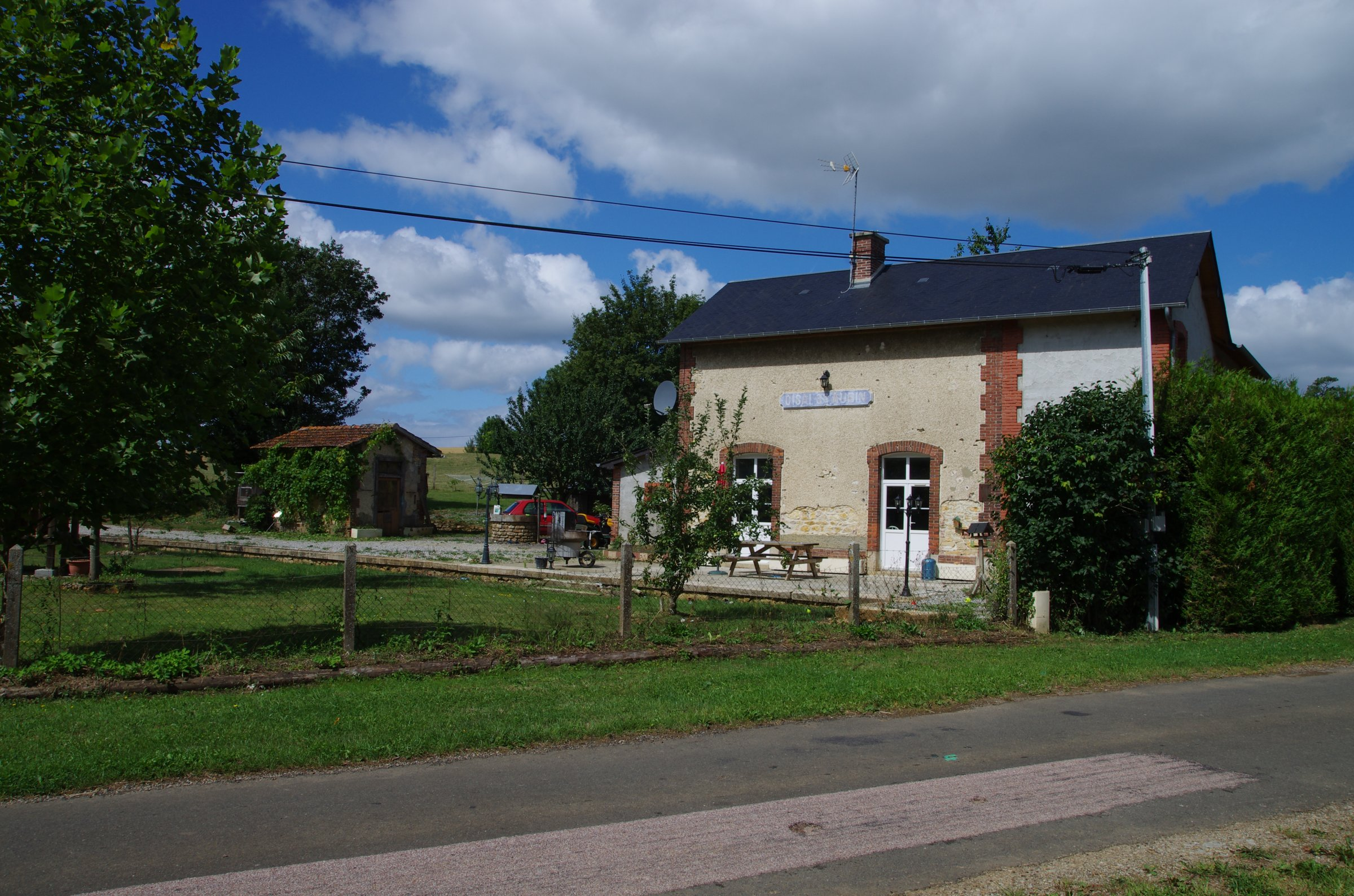
- The old railway station in Cisai
- Location of Cisai-Saint-Aubin
- Location within France Location within Normandy
- Coordinates: 48°46′35″N 0°20′38″E
- Country: France
- Region: Normandy
- Department: Orne
- Arrondissement: Mortagne-au-Perche
- Canton: Vimoutiers
- Intercommunality: Vallées d'Auge et du Merlerault

Government
  - Mayor (2020–2026): Xavier Caplet
- Area^{1}: 14.49 km^{2} (5.59 sq mi)
- Elevation: 228 m (748 ft)
- Highest elevation: 328 m (1,076 ft)
- Lowest elevation: 199 m (653 ft)
- Population (2023): 184
  - Density: 12.7/km^{2} (32.9/sq mi)
- Time zone: UTC+01:00 (CET)
  - Summer (DST): UTC+02:00 (CEST)
- INSEE/Postal code: 61108 /61230
- ^{1} French Land Register data, which excludes lakes, ponds, glaciers > 1 km^{2} (0.386 sq mi or 247 acres) and river estuaries.

Cisai-Saint-Aubin (French pronunciation: [sisɛ sɛ̃.t‿obɛ̃]) is a commune in the Orne department in north-western France. The French priest and palaeographer Robert Devreesse (1894–1978) was born in Cisai-Saint-Aubin.

== Geography ==
The commune is made up of the following collection of villages and hamlets, Cisai-Saint-Aubin, Le Moncel, La Lais, La Beuvinière, Pomont and Le Buisson.

The Commune is one of 27 communes that make up the Natura 2000 protected area of Bocages et vergers du sud Pays d'Auge.

Two rivers The Touques and the Touquettes flow through the commune. In addition two streams, Ruisseau de Fontaine Bouillante and Ruisseau du Derot also pass through the commune.

== Points of interest ==
=== National heritage sites ===
The Commune has two buildings and areas listed as a Monument historique.

- Cisai Castle fifteenth century fortified house, that was registered as a Monument historique 1991.
- Domaine du château des Lettiers eighteenth century grounds with an English-style park, that was registered as a Monument historique 1995. The grounds also cover the neighbouring commune of La Trinité-des-Laitiers

== Notable people ==
- Robert Devreesse (1894 - 1978) a priest and scriptor in the Vatican Library was born here.

== See also ==
- Communes of the Orne department
