= Joseph Gerhard Liebes =

20th century German-Jewish philosopher and academic

- יוסף גרהרד ליבס
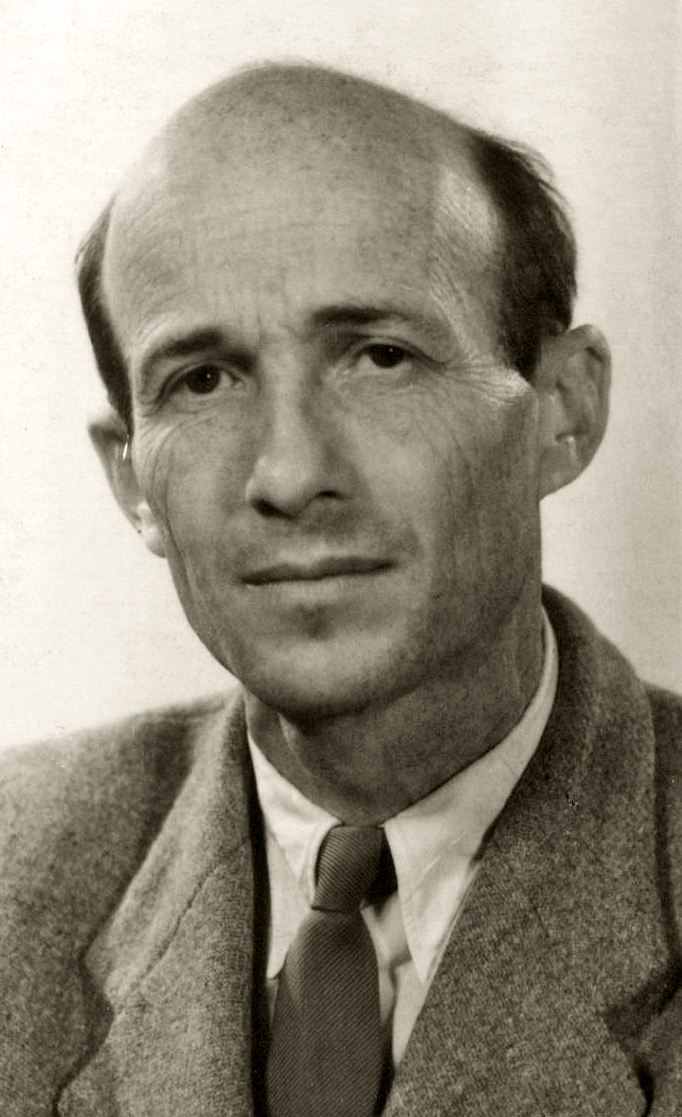
- Born: August 25, 1910; San Salvador, El Salvador
- Died: August 3, 1988 (aged 77); Jerusalem, Israel
- Spouse: Mira Liebowitz
- Awards: Tchernichovsky Prize for Exemplary translation

Academic background
- Education: Hebrew University of Jerusalem; Free University of Berlin; University of Heidelberg

Joseph Gerhard Liebes (Hebrew: יוסף גרהרד ליבס; August 25, 1910, San Salvador, El Salvador – August 3, 1988, Jerusalem) was an Israeli translator and scholar of Ancient Greek classical literature and Latin literature into Hebrew. He translated Plato's writings into Hebrew.

== Biography ==
Liebes was born in 1910 in San Salvador to a German-Jewish businessman. He was reared and educated in Hamburg, where he studied at a Latin and ancient Greek gymnasium. He was active in the Zionist youth movement Blau-Weis (Blue and White).

In 1928 he went to study Judaism at the Hebrew University of Jerusalem. He returned to Germany after a year, because the level of the Department of Classical Studies was not high enough for his liking. He continued his studies at the Free University of Berlin and University of Heidelberg. He underwent agricultural training in Latvia, where he married his first wife.

In 1933, with the rise of the Nazis to power, his doctoral studies were interrupted and he was expelled from the university due to racial laws. He managed to get a certificate to British Mandate after proving they had enough capital. The couple came to Kibbutz Beit Alfa, and after about a year they purchased an orchard and a house in Pardes Hanna-Karkur and engaged in agriculture. The couple had two daughters. They later divorced.

In 1941 he married Mira Leibowitz, the cousin of Yeshayahu Leibowitz. Leibowitz was born in Riga and educated in Berlin. In 1933 she immigrated to Israel. She studied ceramics with Hava Samuel and then went on to study in Paris and Prague. The two still knew each other in Berlin, but the connection between them only intensified in Israel. The couple had two children, both lecturers at the Hebrew University: Tamar Liebes, Professor of Communication, former head of the Department of Communication (married to architect Ulrik Plesner and mother of MK Yohanan Plesner), and Yehuda Liebes, professor emeritus of Jewish Thought.

In 1943 they moved to Jerusalem and lived in Kiryat Shmuel, Jerusalem. This is where Liebes began his life's work: translating classical culture into Hebrew. He translated German poetry, works from Greek and Latin literature, as well as the works of William Shakespeare. His famous enterprise is the translation of all of Plato's writings into Hebrew: Liebes initially planned to translate only a few dialogues, but in light of the enthusiasm with which they were received by the public he decided to continue translating the rest. All of Liebes' books have been published by Schocken Books, and usually include introductions by him.

In 1955 he won the Tchernichovsky Prize for exemplary translation, for translating Plato's Works and Roman Lives by Plutarch into Hebrew.

From 1961 to 1964, he served as Vice President of the Hebrew University, with the presidents Yoel Rekach and Eliyahu Eilat, until he retired to dedicate himself to working at translation. In 1968, he published his book Plato: His Life and Person. He later translated the Nicomachean Ethics of Aristotle, and completed the translation of Plato's writings, in five volumes.

Liebes died in Jerusalem in 1988, after suffering from Alzheimer's disease. Liebes continued to translate even in his later years and translated Homer, but failed to finish it. After his death, his son, Yehuda Liebes, began translating from classical Greek and Latin literature.

== Works ==
- Plato: His Life and Person, Jerusalem - Tel Aviv: Schocken Publishing, 1968.

== Translations ==
- Plato, Plato's Writings, 5 Volumes, Schocken Publishing, 1955–1979.
- Aristotle, Ethics: Nicomachean Ethics, Schocken Publishing, 1973.
- Virgil, Aeneid, Selected Chapters, Introduction and Notes: Yohanan Levy, Schocken Publishing, 1946.
- Plutarch, Lives: Roman Persians, Bialik Institute, 1954.
- William Shakespeare, Julius Caesar, Schocken Publishing, 1951.
- William Shakespeare, Anthony and Cleopatra, Schocken Publishing, 1952.
- Karl Wolfskehl, The Voice Speaks, Schocken Publishing, 1942 (with Franz Bergbor).
- Friedrich Hölderlin, Selected Poems, Schocken Publishing, 1945.
