= La Trinité-des-Laitiers =

- Commune
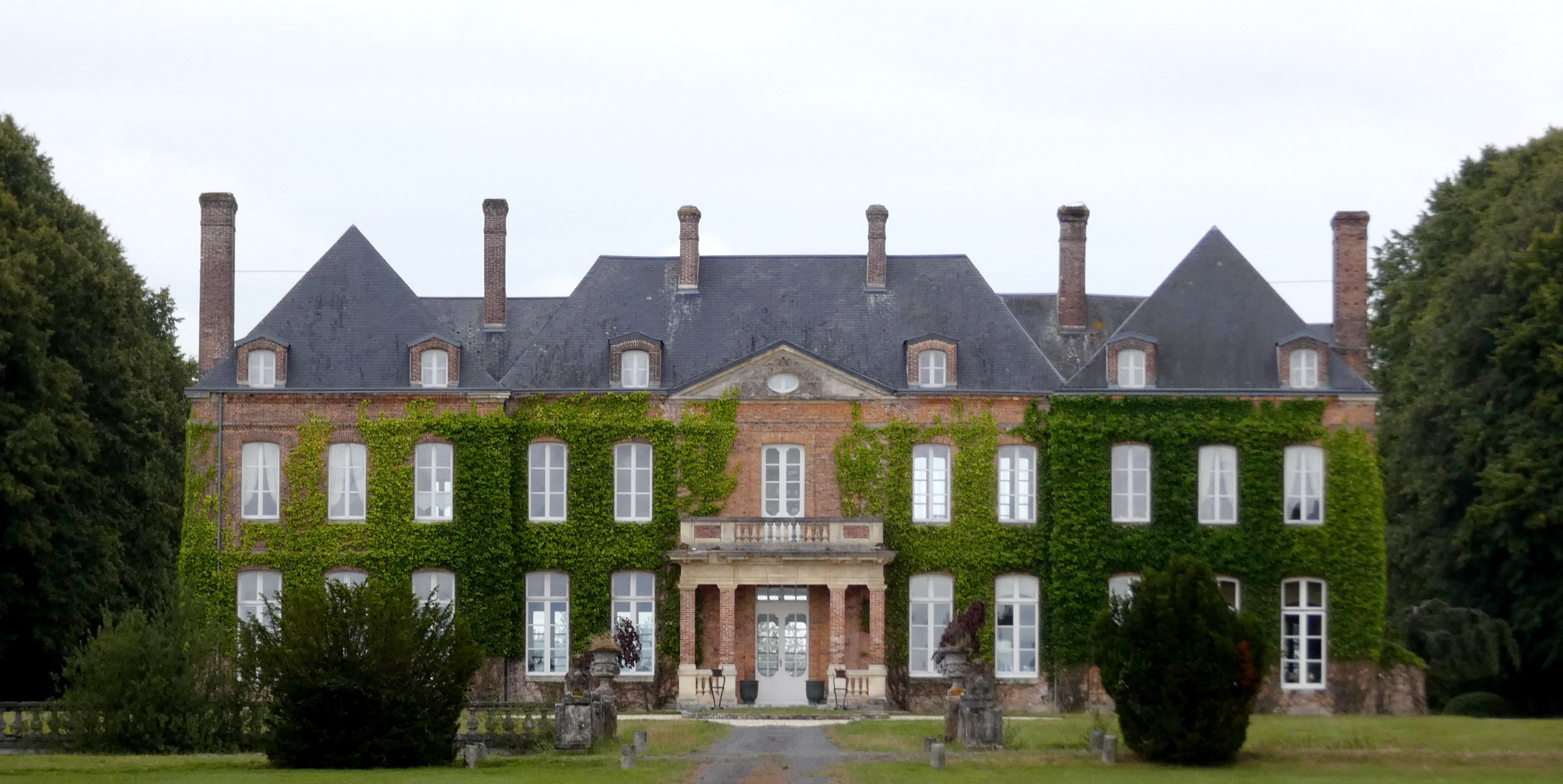
- Castle in La Trinité-des-Laitiers
- Location of La Trinité-des-Laitiers
- Location within France Location within Normandy
- Coordinates: 48°47′54″N 0°22′42″E
- Country: France
- Region: Normandy
- Department: Orne
- Arrondissement: Mortagne-au-Perche
- Canton: Vimoutiers
- Intercommunality: Vallées d'Auge et du Merlerault

Government
  - Mayor (2020–2026): Stéphane Lecaché
- Area^{1}: 11.16 km^{2} (4.31 sq mi)
- Elevation: 307 m (1,007 ft)
- Highest elevation: 321 m (1,053 ft)
- Lowest elevation: 245 m (804 ft)
- Population (2023): 67
  - Density: 6.0/km^{2} (16/sq mi)
- Time zone: UTC+01:00 (CET)
  - Summer (DST): UTC+02:00 (CEST)
- INSEE/Postal code: 61493 /61230
- ^{1} French Land Register data, which excludes lakes, ponds, glaciers > 1 km^{2} (0.386 sq mi or 247 acres) and river estuaries.

La Trinité-des-Laitiers (French pronunciation: [la tʁinite de lɛtje]) is a commune in the Orne department in north-western France.

== Geography ==
The Commune is one of 27 communes that make up the Natura 2000 protected area of Bocages et vergers du sud Pays d'Auge. In addition the commune along with another 69 communes shares part of a 4,747 hectare, Natura 2000 conservation area, called Risle, Guiel, Charentonne.

Two rivers the Touquettes and La Guiel flow through the commune.

== Points of interest ==
=== National heritage sites ===
- Domaine du château des Lettiers - eighteenth century grounds with an English-style park, that was registered as a Monument historique in 1995. The grounds also cover the neighbouring commune of Cisai-Saint-Aubin.

== See also ==
- Communes of the Orne department
