= Ourville-en-Caux =

- Commune
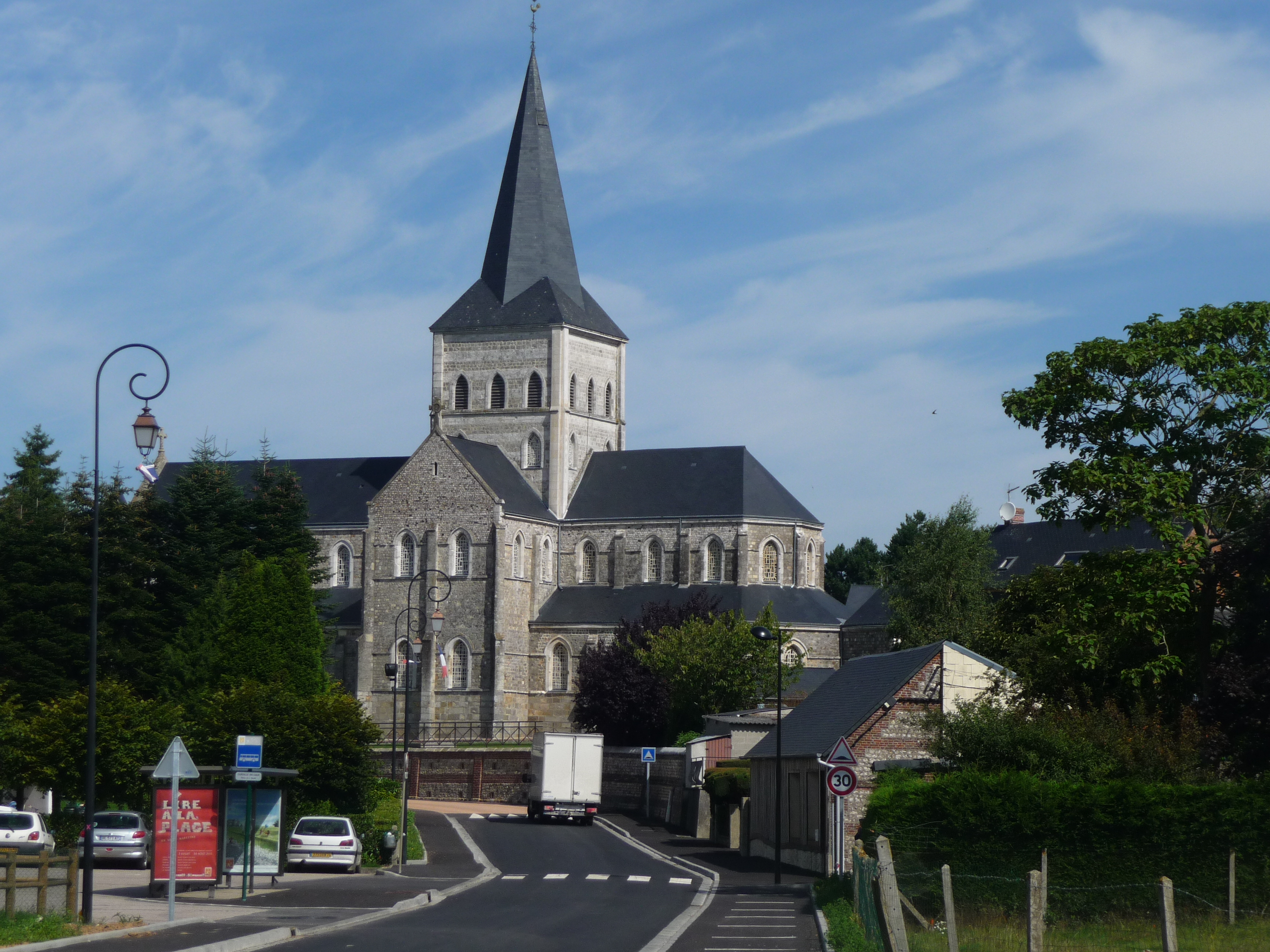
- The church in Ourville-en-Caux

- Coat of arms
- Location of Ourville-en-Caux
- Location within France Location within Normandy
- Coordinates: 49°43′47″N 0°36′23″E
- Country: France
- Region: Normandy
- Department: Seine-Maritime
- Arrondissement: Dieppe
- Canton: Saint-Valery-en-Caux
- Intercommunality: CC Côte d'Albâtre

Government
  - Mayor (2020–2026): Jerôme Douillet
- Area^{1}: 9.86 km^{2} (3.81 sq mi)
- Elevation: 110 m (360 ft)
- Highest elevation: 135 m (443 ft)
- Lowest elevation: 55 m (180 ft)
- Population (2023): 1,088
  - Density: 110/km^{2} (286/sq mi)
- Time zone: UTC+01:00 (CET)
  - Summer (DST): UTC+02:00 (CEST)
- INSEE/Postal code: 76490 /76450
- ^{1} French Land Register data, which excludes lakes, ponds, glaciers > 1 km^{2} (0.386 sq mi or 247 acres) and river estuaries.

Ourville-en-Caux (French pronunciation: [uʁvil ɑ̃ ko], lit. 'Ourville in Caux') is a commune in the Seine-Maritime department in the Normandy region in northern France.

== Geography ==
A farming village with a little light industry, in the Pays de Caux, situated some 30 miles (48 km) northeast of Le Havre, at the junction of the D5, D50, D28 and D75.

== Heraldry ==
Arms of Ourville-en-Caux	The arms of Ourville-en-Caux are blazoned : Quarterly: 1st, Vert a cow's head caboshed Argent; 2nd, Argent a dexter forearm in pale bearing a torch all Azure, 3rd, Argent a flax flower Azure; 4th Vert a sheep's head caboshed Argent.

== Population ==
Historical population
Year	Pop.	±% p.a.
1968	693	—
1975	756	+1.25%
1982	896	+2.46%
1990	933	+0.51%
1999	1,041	+1.22%
2007	1,104	+0.74%
2012	1,084	−0.36%
2017	1,146	+1.12%
2023	1,088	−0.86%
Source: INSEE

== Places of interest ==
- The church, dating from the nineteenth century.

== See also ==
- Communes of the Seine-Maritime department
