= Orville, Orne =

Orville
- Part of Sap-en-Auge
- Location of Orville
- Location within France Location within Normandy
- Coordinates: 48°53′27″N 0°16′24″E
- Country: France
- Region: Normandy
- Department: Orne
- Arrondissement: Mortagne-au-Perche
- Canton: Vimoutiers
- Commune: Sap-en-Auge
- Area^{1}: 7.25 km^{2} (2.80 sq mi)
- Elevation: 160 m (520 ft)
- Highest elevation: 242 m (794 ft)
- Lowest elevation: 139 m (456 ft)
- Population (2022): 110
  - Density: 15/km^{2} (39/sq mi)
- Time zone: UTC+01:00 (CET)
  - Summer (DST): UTC+02:00 (CEST)
- Postal code: 61120
- ^{1} French Land Register data, which excludes lakes, ponds, glaciers > 1 km^{2} (0.386 sq mi or 247 acres) and river estuaries.

Orville (French pronunciation: [ɔʁvil]) is a former commune in the Orne department in north-western France. On 1 January 2016, it was merged into the new commune of Sap-en-Auge.

== See also ==
- Communes of the Orne department
