= Bar Yochai (song) =

Jewish hymn

"Bar Yochai" (Hebrew: בַּר יוֹחַאי) is a kabbalistic piyyut (poem or hymn) extolling the spiritual attainments of Simeon bar Yochai, the purported author of the preeminent kabbalistic work, the Zohar. Composed in the 16th century by Rabbi Shimon Lavi, a Sephardi Hakham and kabbalist in Tripoli, Libya, it is the most prominent and popular kabbalistic hymn, being sung by Jewish communities around the world. The hymn is sung by Sephardi and Ashkenazi Jews alike on Lag BaOmer, the Yom Hillula (festival day) of bar Yochai, and is also sung during synagogue services and at the Shabbat evening meal by certain groups. Incorporating expressions from the Tanakh, rabbinical commentaries, and the Zohar, the hymn displays its author's own mastery of Torah and kabbalah. According to Isaac Ratzabi, the song's use of "bar Yochai" (rather than "ben Yochai," the patronymic used by Talmudic texts) is the probable reason for "bar Yochai"'s modern ubiquity.

== History ==
=== Author ===
"Bar Yochai" was written by Shimon Lavi (1486–1585), a Sephardi Hakham, kabbalist, physician, astronomer, and poet. Born in Spain, Lavi and his family were forced out of the country by the Spanish Expulsion of 1492 and relocated to Fez, Morocco, where Lavi studied both Torah and kabbalah. In 1549 Lavi set out to immigrate to Palestine, but was kidnapped and held for ransom by "Arab bandits". He was redeemed and came to Tripoli, where he found the community lacking spiritual guidance and decided to settle there instead. He is credited with the founding of the community's religious institutions and the revival of Torah study and takkanot (Jewish community regulations) there. He authored the kabbalistic commentary Ketem Paz on the Zohar and a number of other piyyutim which were published together with this work.

=== Popularity ===
"Bar Yochai" is a prominent and popular kabbalistic piyyut, being sung by Jewish communities around the world. It is not known how it was conveyed from Tripoli to Safed, Israel, but in the latter city it was adopted by the disciples of the Arizal, who added it to their Kabbalat Shabbat Friday-evening synagogue service. From Israel it was introduced to the diaspora by the Arizal's students and Rabbi Moses Cordovero. It was printed for the first time in the beginning of the 17th century. In 1611 it was printed in the sefer Imrei Binah in Prague, and the following year in the sefer Tikkunei Shabbat in Kraków. It was subsequently translated into Judeo-Arabic, Ladino, and Persian by the various Jewish communities of the diaspora.

== Song ==
The hymn consists of ten stanzas, with each stanza beginning with the words Bar Yochai. Referencing the Ten Sephirot, the stanzas describe how Simeon bar Yochai mastered each sephirah until he ascended to the "supreme mystery". The initial letters of the first nine stanzas (after the words Bar Yochai) spell out the Hebrew name of the poet, Shimon Lavi. After each stanza is a one-line refrain:

Bar Yochai, nimshachta ashrekha, shemen sasson mechaverekha
Bar Yochai – fortunate are you, anointed with joyous oil over and above your companions

The hymn incorporates expressions from Tanakh, rabbinical teachings and ideas, and expressions from the Zohar, displaying Lavi's own mastery of scriptural and kabbalistic sources.

Some versions add an eleventh stanza referencing the Messiah.

=== Words ===
בַּר-יוחַאי, נִמְשַׁחְתָּ - אַשְׁרֶיךָ!
שֶׁמֶן שָׂשׂון מֵחֲבֵרֶיךָ.

בַּר-יוחַאי, שֶׁמֶן מִשְׁחַת קדֶשׁ
נִמְשַׁחְתָּ מִמִּדַּת הַקּדֶשׁ,
נָשָׂאתָ צִיץ נֵזֶר הַקּדֶשׁ,
חָבוּשׁ עַל ראשְׁךָ פְּאֵרֶךָ.

בַּר-יוחַאי, מושַׁב טוב יָשַׁבְתָּ,
יום נַסְתָּ, יום אֲשֶׁר בָּרַחְתָּ,
בִּמְעָרַת צוּרִים שֶׁעָמַדְתָּ,
שָׁם קָנִיתָ הודְךָ וַהֲדָרֶךָ.

בַּר-יוחַאי, עֲצֵי שִׁטִּים עומְדִים,
לִמּוּדֵי ד' הֵם לומְדִים,
אור מֻפְלָא, אור הַיְקוד הֵם יוקְדִים,
הֲלא הֵמָּה יורוּךָ מורֶךָ.

בַּר-יוחַאי, וְלִשְׂדֵה תַּפּוּחִים
עָלִיתָ לִלְקט בּו מֶרְקָחִים,
סוד תּורָה בְּצִיצִים וּפְרָחִים,
"נַעֲשֶׂה אָדָם" נֶאֱמַר בַּעֲבוּרֶךָ.

בַּר-יוחַאי, נֶאֱזַרְתָּ בִּגְבוּרָה,
וּבְמִלְחֶמֶת אֵשׁ דָּת הַשַּׁעְרָה,
וְחֶרֶב הוצֵאתָ מִתַּעְרָהּ
שָׁלַפְתָּ נֶגֶד צורְרֶיךָ.

בַּר-יוחַאי, לִמְקום אַבְנֵי שַׁיִשׁ
הִגַּעְתָּ וּפְנֵי אַרְיֵה לַיִשׁ,
גַּם גֻּלַּת כּותֶרֶת עַל עַיִשׁ,
תָּשׁוּר וּמִי יְשׁוּרֶךָ.

בַּר-יוחַאי, בְּקדֶשׁ הַקֳּדָשִׁים.
קַו יָרק מְחַדֵּשׁ חֳדָשִׁים,
שֶׁבַע שַׁבָּתות סוד חֲמִשִּׁים
קָשַׁרְתָּ קִשְׁרֵי שִׁי"ן קְשָׁרֶיךָ.

בַּר-יוחַאי, יוּ"ד חָכְמָה קְדוּמָה
הִשְׁקַפְתָּ לִכְבוּדָה פְּנִימָה,
לֶ"ב נְתִיבות רֵאשִׁית תְּרוּמָה
אֵת כְּרוּב מִמְשַׁח זִיו דּורֶךָ.

בַּר-יוחַאי, אור מֻפְלָא רם מַעְלָה
יָרֵאתָ מִלְּהַבִּיט כִּי רַב לָהּ,
תַּעֲלוּמָה וְאַיִן קרָא לָהּ,
נַמְתָּ: עַיִן לא תְשׁוּרֶךָ.

בַּר-יוחַאי, אַשְׁרֵי יולַדְתֶּךָ,
אַשְׁרֵי הָעָם לומְדֶיךָ,
וְאַשְׁרֵי הָעומְדִים עַל סודֶךָ,
לובְשֵׁי חשֶׁן תֻּמֶּיךָ וְאוּרֶיךָ

Translation:

Bar Yochai! You are anointed - you are praised -
with joyful oil, over your fellows.

Bar Yochai, sacred anointing oil,
You were anointed from the holy type,
You carry the priestly frontlet, the holy diadem,
Your crown is set upon your head.

Bar Yochai, you picked a good place
On the day that you fled, the day you ran away;
In the rocky cave you went to,
There, you acquired your glory and majesty.

Bar Yochai, acacia trees stand,
Taught of God, the students.
Wondrous light, they blaze with light,
Are they not the students you were taught of!

Bar Yochai, and to the apple orchard
You went, to glean fragrances,
The secret teaching in blossoms and almonds.
"Let us make Man," They said for you.

Bar Yochai, you dressed in strength,
Toward the gate in the war of the fiery Law,
You drew a sword, sharpened it,
You drew it against your enemies.

Bar Yochai, to the place of marble stones,
You came against the lion,
And earned your laurels against the bear,
When you come, who can ambush you?

Bar Yochai, in the Holy of Holies.
The green line renews the months,
seven weeks, the secret fifty,
You bound, the knots of
Shin are your knots.

== Customs ==
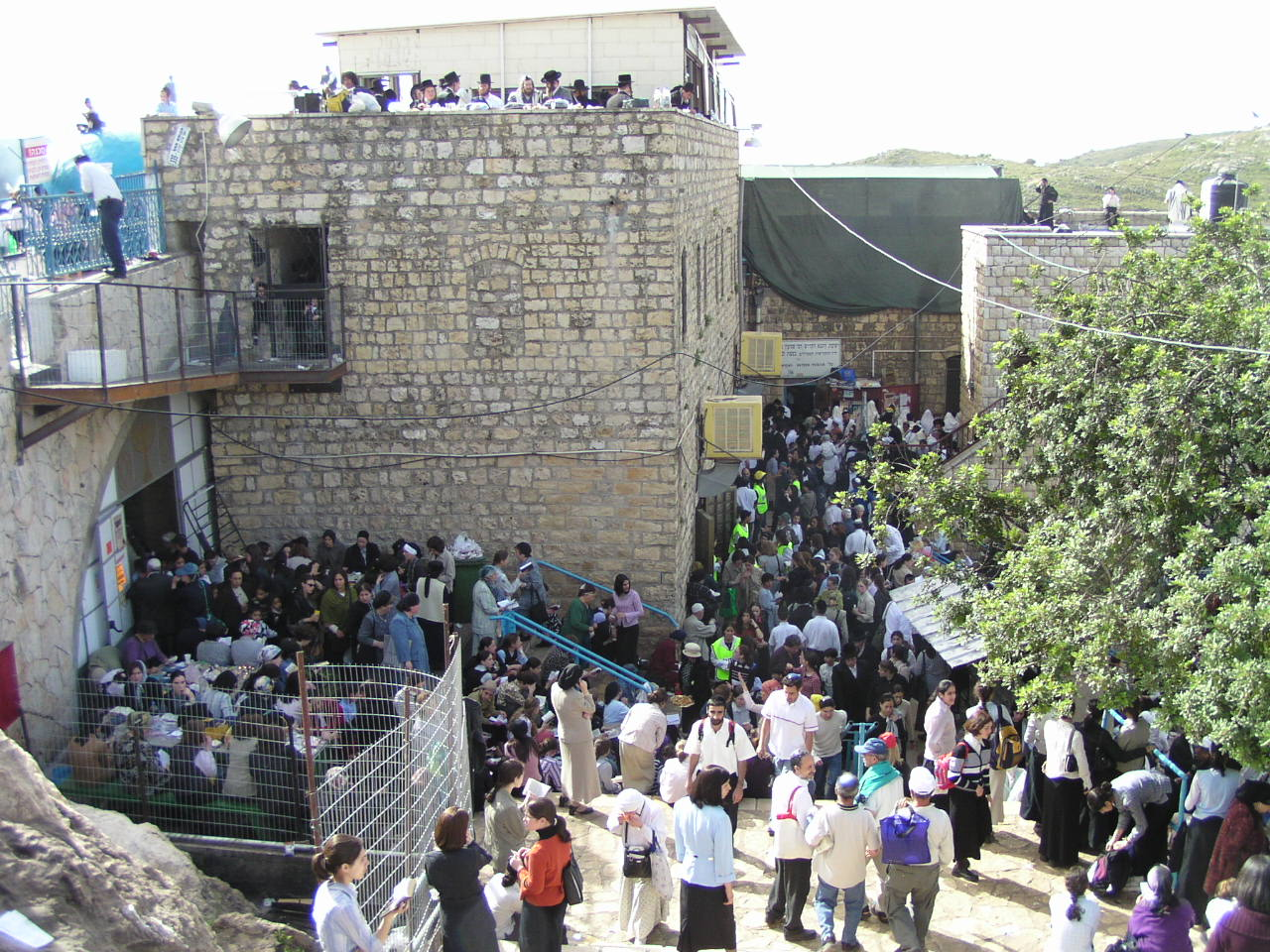
The tomb of Rabbi Simeon bar Yochai in Meron on Lag BaOmer

While the Jews of North Africa sang the hymn every Friday night before eating the Shabbat evening meal, the Jews of Eastern Europe did not adopt this practice. To this day, most Ashkenazi Jews do not sing the hymn at all of their Shabbat evening meals. The Artscroll Siddur indicates that many sing it Friday nights during Sfira.

Both Sephardi and Ashkenazi Jews sing the hymn on Lag BaOmer, the Yom Hillula (anniversary of death) of bar Yochai. Among Persian Jews, the hymn was sung on Friday nights in Hebrew and on Lag BaOmer in Persian.

Different customs were adopted by Sephardi, Ashkenazi, and Hasidic communities in Israel pertaining to the singing of the hymn during Friday-night synagogue services and/or at the Shabbat evening meal, but all groups sing the hymn on Lag BaOmer. In the northern Israeli town of Meron, site of the tomb of bar Yochai, the hymn is "heard around the clock" at the massive celebrations that take place there on Lag BaOmer.

The Ashkenazi tune for the hymn differs slightly from the Sephardi tune; according to an account from Rabbi Yeshayahu Margolin, the latter is the same as that sung by Lavi himself.
