= Kol Bo =

Kol Bo (Hebrew: כל-בו, 'all is in it') is a collection of Jewish ritual and civil laws. Its author has not yet been ascertained. The work in content resembles other codes, as, for instance, the Orḥot Ḥayyim, though in its form it is very different.

== Its contents and peculiarities ==
The Kol Bo does not pretend to any order; the laws that were later arranged in Orach Hayyim are found together with those that were later arranged in Yoreh De'ah and Even haEzer. Likewise, many laws are entirely missing in the Kol Bo. It is peculiar also in that some of the laws are briefly stated, while others are stated at great length, without division into paragraphs.

After the regular code, terminating with the laws of mourning (No. 115), there comes a miscellaneous collection, containing the "takkanot" of R. Gershom and of Rabbeinu Tam, the Ma'aseh Torah of Judah haNasi, the legend of Solomon's throne, the legend of Joshua b. Levi, a kabbalistic dissertation on brit milah, a dissertation on gematria and noṭariḳon, 61 decisions of Eliezer ben Nathan; 44 decisions of Tashbetz, decisions of Isaac of Corbeil, and responsa of Peretz ha-Kohen, decisions of Isaac Orbil, of the geonim Naṭronai, Hai Gaon, Amram Gaon, Nahshon Gaon, laws of the mikveh taken from Perez's Sefer ha-Mitzvot, responsa, and finally the law of excommunication of Nahmanides.

Due to its varied contents, the book was later quoted under the title of "Sefer ha-Likkutim".

== Author ==
As to the author of the Kol Bo, there are different opinions.

Joseph Caro, in saying that the words of the Kol Bo are identical with those of the Orḥot Ḥayyim of Aaron ben Jacob ha-Kohen (14th century), seems to have suggested that the Kol Bo is an abridgment of the Orḥot Ḥayyim. This is also the opinion of the Chida, and according to Aaron Schlitzstadt, the epitomizer was a certain Shemariah b. Simḥah, in the 14th century; others think that it was Joseph ben Tobiah of Provence. By some scholars it is attributed to a pupil of Peretz ha-Kohen; by others it is identified with the "Sefer ha-Nayyar"; and by Gedaliah ibn Yaḥya it is attributed to Isaac ben Sheshet. Benjacob concluded that the author of the Kol Bo was Aaron ben Jacob ha-Kohen, author of the Orḥot Ḥayyim, and that the Kol Bo was an earlier form of the Orḥot. Its lack of system and the inadequacy of its authorities are due, Benjacob considers, to the youth of the author. Zunz refutes Benjacob's arguments, his opinion being that the Kol Bo is a compendium of the Orḥot Ḥayyim. The oldest edition bears neither place nor date, but Joseph Zedner conjectures that it was published at Naples in 1490; the second edition is dated "Constantinople, 1519".
