= Aaron ben Jacob ha-Kohen =

14th-century Provençal rabbi and scholar

Aaron ben Jacob ha-Kohen was one of the hachmei Provence, one of a family of scholars living at Narbonne, France (not Lunel, as David Conforte and others say), who suffered from The Great Exile of 1306.

Ben Jacob emigrated to Mallorca, and there, sometime before 1327, composed a ritual work of great merit bearing the title Orchot Hayyim "Paths of Life". The first part deals chiefly with the laws concerning daily prayers, Shabbat, and the festivals, and was published in Florence in 1752. The work is a compilation of Talmudic laws and discussions rather than an original system and was conceived on a plan similar to Jacob ben Asher's great code, the Arba'ah Turim, which appeared soon afterward and superseded it as a ritual guide on account of its more practical character. The Orchot Hayyim, however, contains some ethical and doctrinal chapters which are not found in the Arba'ah Turim.

Ben Jacob was especially fond of mystic lore and rabbinical discussion. A less strict legalist than Jacob ben Asher, Aaron's Orchot Hayyim is of greater value to the student of literature than to one who seeks practical decisions.

A different work, the Kol Bo, is considered by some to be an abridgement of Orchot Hayyim written by another author or by ben Jacob himself; according to others, Kol Bo is a first draft of Orchot Hayyim.

== See also ==
- Hachmei Provence
