= Eastern Upper Galilee Natural Region =

Coordinates: 32°57′48″N 35°29′48″E

- Natural Region
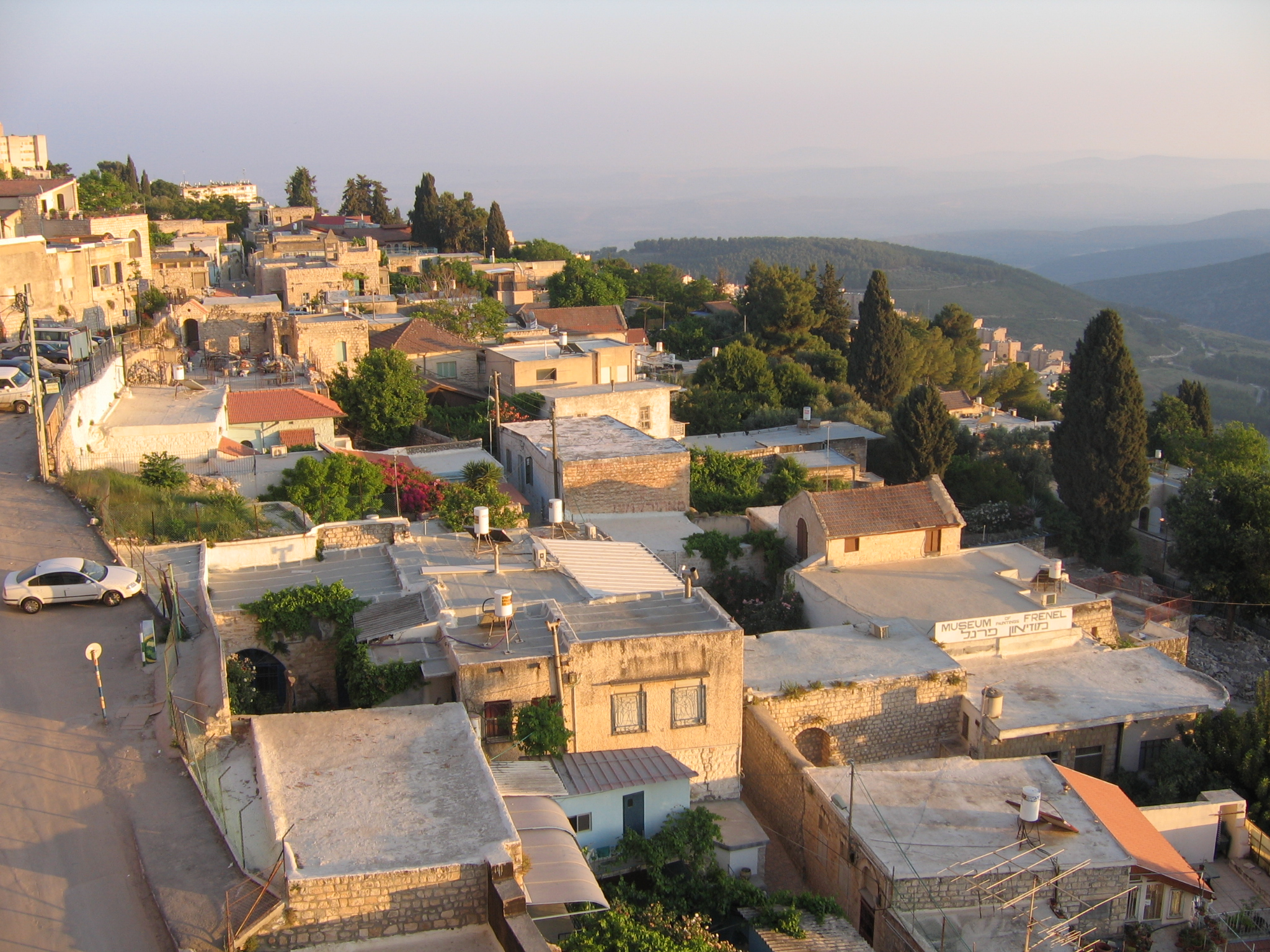
- View of the artists' quarter of Safed
- Interactive map of Eastern Upper Galilee Natural Region
- Country: Israel
- District: Northern
- Subdistrict: Safed
- Largest City: Safed

Area
  - Total: 334 km^{2} (129 sq mi)

Population (2024)
  - Total: 59,264

Ethnicity
  - Jews and others: 87.8%
  - Arabs: 8.4%

The Eastern Upper Galilee Natural Region is a natural region in the Safed Subdistrict, in the Northern District of Israel. Safed is the largest city in the natural region.

== Geography ==
Districts, Subdistricts and Natural Regions of the State of Israel, 2018

As its name suggests, the natural region consists of the eastern portion of the Upper Galilee (the remainder of the Upper Galilee is located in the Yehi'am and Elon natural regions in the Acre Subdistrict). It is located east of Mount Meron, and borders Lebanon to the north. It has an area of 334 km^{2}. The largest city in the natural region is Safed, one of the four holy cities of Judaism, which contains 65 percent of the natural region's population. The only other town in the natural area with more than 2,000 people is Jish. The natural region contains portions of the Upper Galilee, Merom HaGalil, and Mevo'ot HaHermon regional councils.

== Demographics ==
88 percent of the residents of the Hazor Natural Region are Jewish. 8 percent of residents are Arab, concentrated in the villages of Jish and Ein al-Asad, and in 'Akbara, a neighborhood of Safed. Two percent of the natural region's population are Circassians, who are concentrated in the town of Rehaniya, and whom the Israel Central Bureau of Statistics incorrectly counts as Arabs.

Historical population
Year	Pop.	±%
1972	22,000	—
1983	24,900	+13.2%
1995	32,700	+31.3%
2008	45,090	+37.9%
2022	57,715	+28.0%
2024	59,264	+2.7%

== Administrative local authorities ==
Cities	Local Councils	Villages
Safed	Jish	Merom HaGalil: Alma; Amirim; Amuka; Avivim; Bar Yohai; Birya; Dalton; Ein al-Asad; Kadita; Kfar Hananya; Kfar Hoshen; Kfar Shamai; Kerem Ben Zimra; Meron; Or HaGanuz; Parod; Rehaniya; Shefer; Mevo'ot HaHermon: Dishon; Kahal; Margaliot; Ramot Naftali; Upper Galilee: Malkia; Manara; Misgav Am; Yiftah

== Voting Patterns ==
In the 2022 election, 72 percent of voters in the natural region voted for the parties of the right-wing coalition led by Benjamin Netanyahu, while 20 percent voted for the parties of the center-left coalition led by Yair Lapid and 5 percent voted for the Arab parties.

In the 2026 election, 68 percent of voters in the natural region voted for the parties of the right-wing coalition led by Benjamin Netanyahu, while 21 percent voted for the parties of the center-left coalition led by Gadi Eisenkot and 7 percent voted for the Arab parties. An additional 1.5 percent voted for the Reservists, and 1.3 percent voted for Amcha Yisrael. Voter turnout increased 14 percent from the 2022 election.
