= Route 866 (Israel) =

Route in Israel

Route 866
- כביש 866

Route information
- Length: 11.4 km (7.1 mi)
- Existed: 1932–present

Major junctions
- South end: Hananya Junction
- North end: Meron Junction

Location
- Country: Israel

Highway system
- Roads in Israel; Highways
← Route 864	→ Route 869

Route 866 is a north-south regional highway in northern Israel. It begins at Hananya junction with Highway 85 in the south and ends at Meron junction with Highway 89 in the north.

== History ==
The road was paved in the early 1930s to connect Highway 85 to Highway 89 and thus create the Acre-Safed road. In Safed, Highway 89 connected to the Rosh Pinna-Safed road, which was already paved during the First World War, and ended at the intersection with Highway 90 in Rosh Pinna. The construction of this section helped the link between Safed and Haifa, following the shortening of the travel route that previously passed through Tiberias, or by camel caravans on a narrow lane.

In the early 1950s, there were two shooting attacks on the road in the section of the road near Miron, in which 3 people were killed and others were injured.

In the 1950s, the settlements of Parod, Shefer and Amirim were established on the side of the road.

== Junctions (South to North) ==
District	Location	km	mi	Name	Destinations	Notes
Northern	Kfar Hananya	0	0.0	צומת חנניה (Hananya Junction)	Highway 85	
Northern	Ein al-Asad	1.9	1.2	צומת עין אל-אסד (Ein al-Asad Junction)	Road 8591	
Northern	Parod	2.5	1.6	צומת פרוד (Parod Junction)	Entrance to Parod	
Northern	Amirim	4.3	2.7	צומת אמירים (Amirim Junction)	Entrance to Amirim	
Northern	Shefer	4.4	2.7	צומת שפר (Shefer Junction)	Entrance to Shefer	
Northern	Kfar Shamai	7	4.3	צומת כפר שמאי (Kfar Shamai Junction)	Entrance to Kfar Shamai	
Northern	Meron	11	6.8	צומת מירון (Meron Junction)	Road 8599	
Northern	Meron	11.4	7.1	צומת מירון (Meron Junction)	Highway 89	
1.000 mi = 1.609 km; 1.000 km = 0.621 mi

== See also ==
- List of Israeli highways
