= Karni =

Karni may refer to:

- Karni Mata, a Hindu folk deity of Rajasthan
- Karni crossing, a border crossing between Israel and the Gaza Strip
- Western Armenian transliteration of Garni, a village and associated classical temple in Armenia
- A carnival, as run by the University of Nottingham Students' Union
- Annie Karni, American journalist
- Asher Karni (born 1954)
- Gilad Karni
- Mika Karni
- Wolf Karni (1911–1996)
- Karni Liddell (born 1979)
- Karni Singh Rathore (1953–2005)
- Karni Singh (1924–1988)
- Karni Ilyas

== See also ==
- Karri (disambiguation)
