= Reyhaniye =

Reyhaniye can refer to:

- Reyhanlı, a town in the Turkish province of Antakya
- Rehaniya, a village in northern Israel
