= Farradiyya =

Farradiyya الفرّاضية Ferradheh, al-Faradhiyyah, Ferradieh
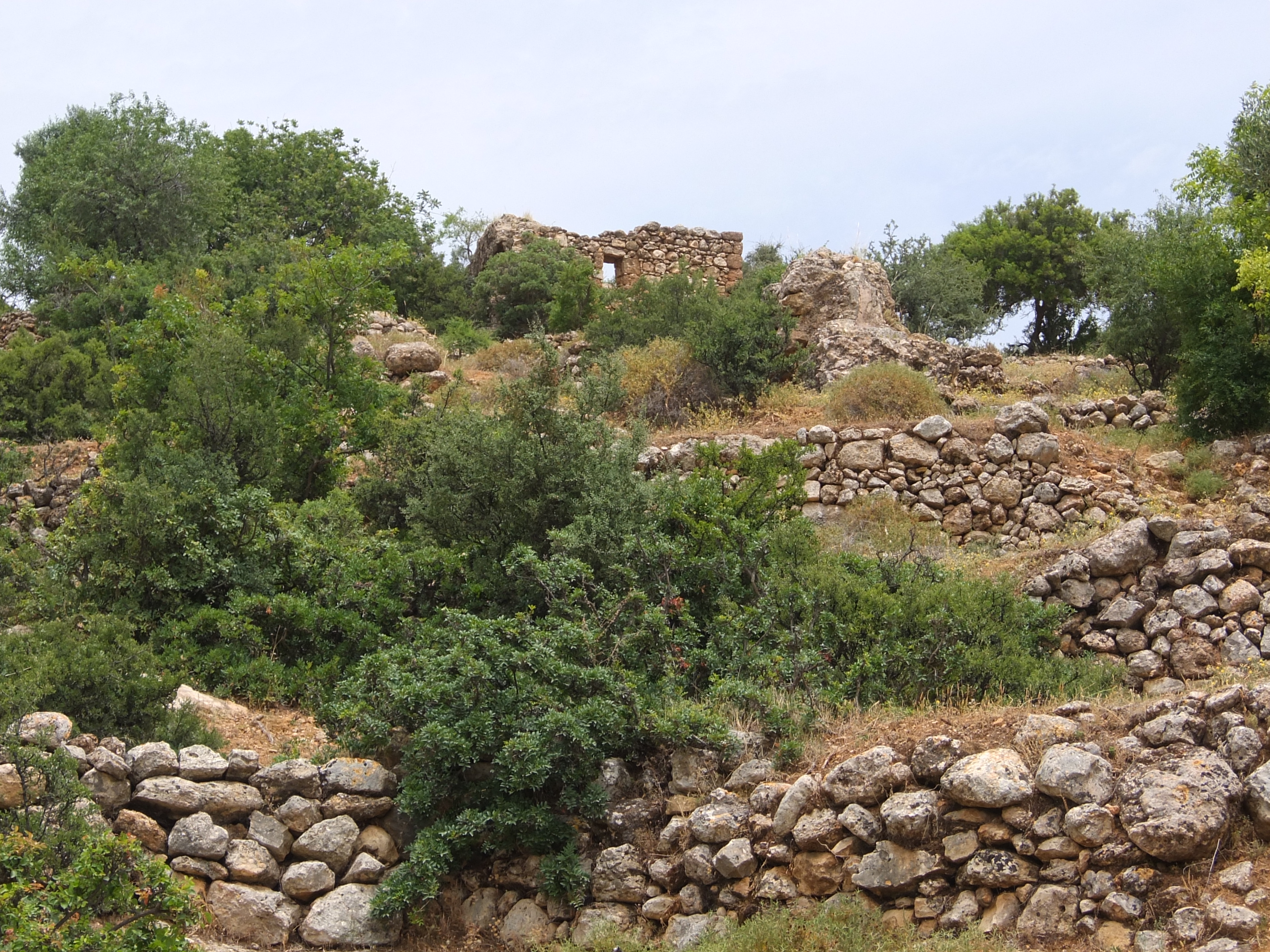
- General view of village Farradiyya

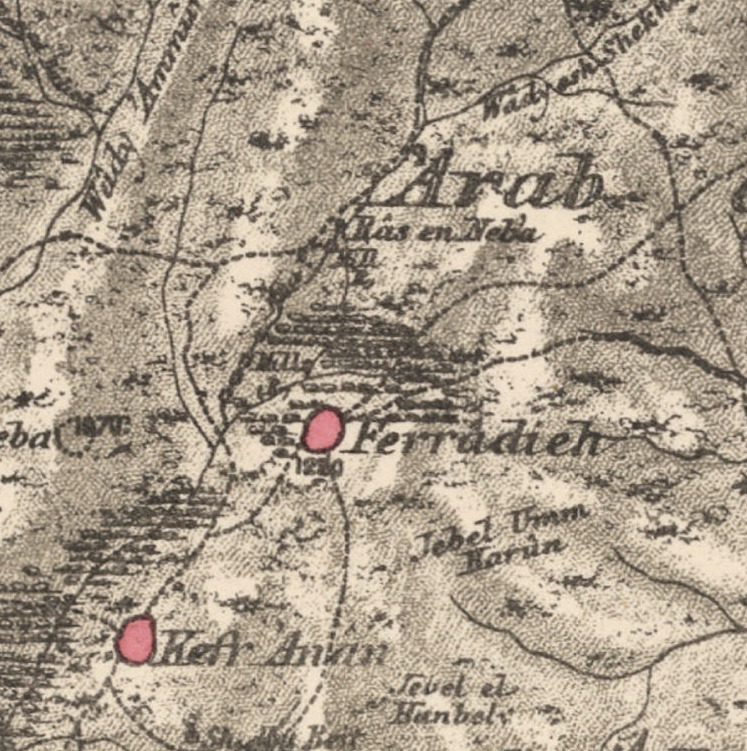
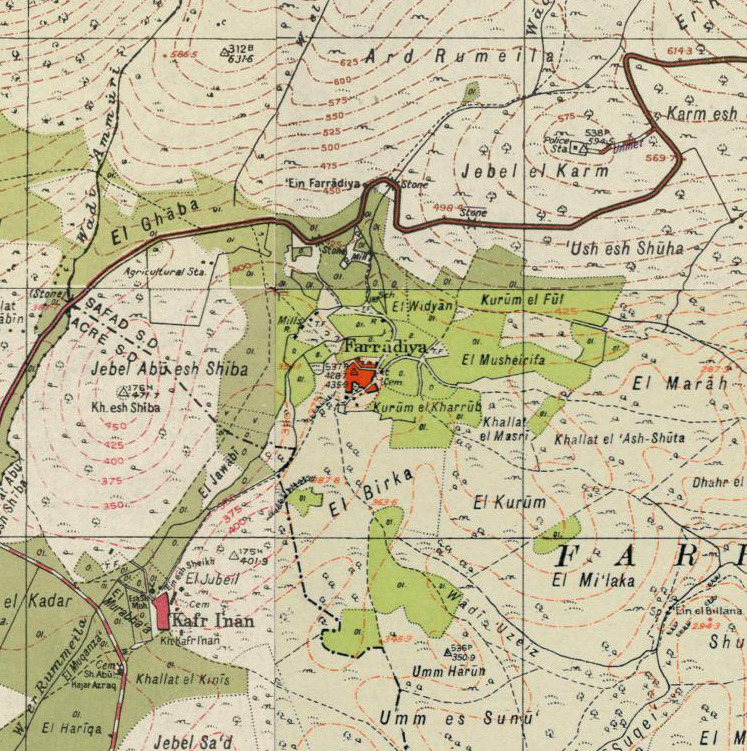
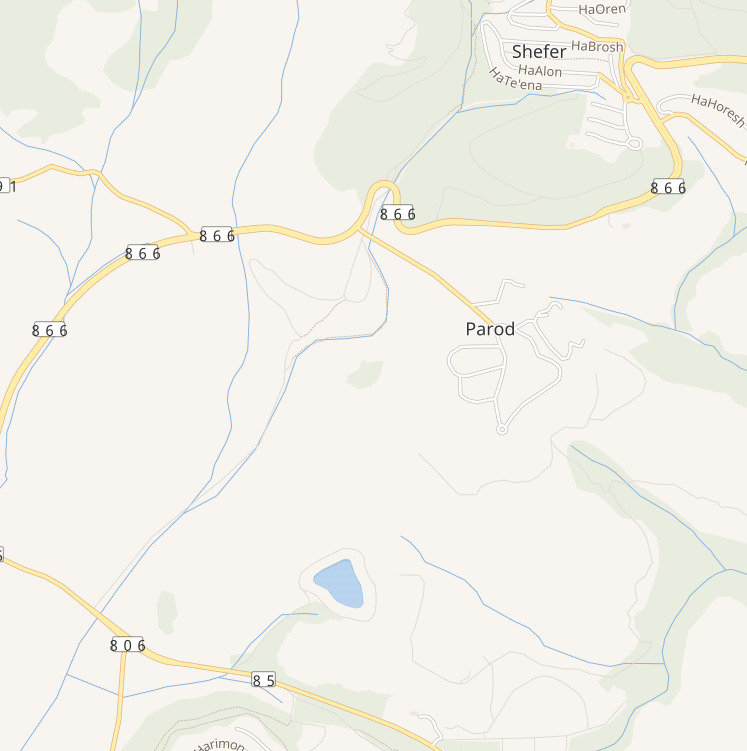
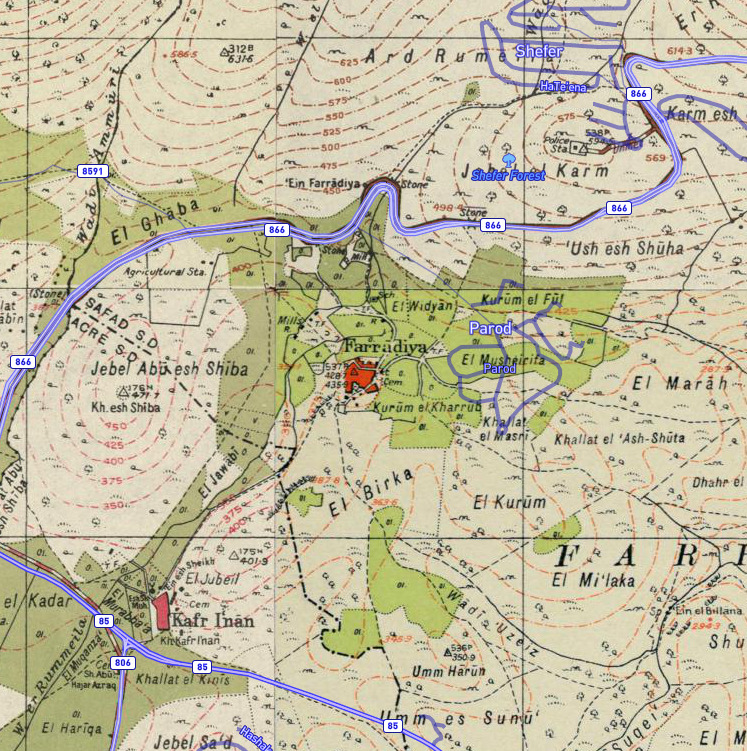
- 1870s map 1940s map modern map 1940s with modern overlay map A series of historical maps of the area around Farradiyya (click the buttons)

- Location within Mandatory Palestine
- Coordinates: 32°55′54″N 35°25′42″E
- Palestine grid: 190/259
- Geopolitical entity: Mandatory Palestine
- Subdistrict: Safad
- Date of depopulation: February 1949

Area
  - Total: 20.0 km^{2} (7.7 sq mi)

Population (1945)
  - Total: 670
- Cause(s) of depopulation: Expulsion by Yishuv forces
- Current Localities: Parod, Shefer

Farradiyya (Arabic: الفرّاضية, romanized: al-Farrāḍiyyah) was a Palestinian Arab village of 670 located 8 kilometers (5.0 mi) southwest of Safad. In 1949, an Israeli kibbutz called Parod was built atop the ethnically cleansed village.

Farradiyya was situated on the southern slopes of Mount Zabud with an average elevation of 375 meters (1,230 ft) above sea level. The Safad–Nazareth highway (Route 866) passed it to the north. Its total land area was 19,747 dunams, of which 25 dunams were built-up areas and 5,365 dunams cultivable.

== History ==
=== Classical antiquity ===
The site has been suggested as that of the 2nd century CE Jewish community of Farod (alt. sp. Pārud), mentioned once in the Babylonian Talmud (Avodah Zarah 31a), and the place of residence of tannaic scholar, Bar Kappara. One Jewish tradition also places the burial site of Talmudic scholar Nachum Ish Gamzu on the main road as one approaches Farradiyya, where was once seen a large edifice made of hewn stones.

=== Middle ages ===
Under the Abbasid Caliphate, al-Farradiyya was a part of Jund al-Urdunn ("Province of Jordan"). In 985 CE, Arab geographer al-Muqaddasi describes it as a large village between Acre and Tiberias, with a mosque for Friday sermons. He added that water was plentiful, the surrounding country was pleasant, and there were abundant grapes and vineyards in the village.

=== Ottoman era ===
Farradiyya was incorporated into the Ottoman Empire in 1517, after being ruled by Crusaders, Ayyubids, and the Mamluks. By the 1596 tax record, it was a part of the nahiya ("subdistrict") of Jira, part of the Safad Sanjak. The village consisted of 40 households and 3 bachelors, an estimated 237 persons; all Muslims. The villagers paid taxes on wheat, barley, olives, fruits, beehives, goats, and pastures; a total of 5,200 akçe.

A map from Napoleon's invasion of 1799 by Pierre Jacotin showed the place, named as "Farod". In 1875 Victor Guérin noted the spring, Aïn Ferradheh, which had formerly driven several mills, but were now destroyed. He found the village to have about 150 Muslim inhabitants.

In 1881, the PEF's Survey of Western Palestine described the village as being built of stone and with the inhabitants growing olives, figs, and tilling small gardens. The population was still estimated to be about 150. Springs from Mount al-Jarmaq to the north provided most of the village's water supply, and a boys' elementary school was established during this period.

A population list from about 1887 showed that Farradiyya had about 455 Muslim inhabitants.

=== British Mandate era ===
After the British took over Palestine from the Ottomans in 1917, Farradiyya became a part of the British Mandate of Palestine in 1922. Under the Mandate, it had a thriving agriculture sector, and was known for its model experimental farm which covered 300 dunams of land. The farm was established to improve the variety of apples, apricots, almonds, figs, grapes, pears, and to develop new seed varieties. It had an arboretum where 2,000 plants were grown and distributed to local fellahin, and the farm provided advice services to teach farmers from the Acre and Safad districts how to raise poultry and beehives. Apart from the farm, there were several water-powered mills in the vicinity of Farradiyya. The village was also the site of a shrine for a local religious leader named Shaykh Mansur. A report from the village (before 1933) noted the Maqam (shrine) for Sheik Mansur as "a square building with arch and niche." The report also noted that there was a medieval arch in the cemetery.

In the 1922 census of Palestine, the village had 362 Muslim residents, rising to 465 in the 1931 census; 464 Muslims and 1 Christian, in a total of 101 houses.

Farradiya, winter 2019

The village was visited in 1933 by a representative from the Department of Antiquities, who reported that "A maqam known locally by the name of "Sheikh Manṣur" is standing in the main track leading to the village at a point about halfway between the village itself and the Govt. School for boys. It is a square room in a ruinous condition about 4m x 4m. The only part which is still to be seen in position is the northern wall -it consists of nine courses above the basement with an average of 27 cm height; each course; making a total of 2.45 m high. The N.E. corner as well as the middle of the wall have worn pilasters with 1/2 inch projections. The bases and capitals have simple mouldings. The top most course is made of moulded stones forming a cornice." The shrine of "Sheikh Manṣur" is thought to be that of Rabbi Tanḥum of Parod.

The British built here a fortified police station.

In the 1945 statistics the population was 670 Muslims, with a total of 19,747 dunams of land, according to an official land and population survey. Of this, 1,182 dunams were plantations and irrigable land, 4,137 for cereals; while a total of 25 dunams was built-up, or urban, area.

=== 1948 War and aftermath ===
Farradiyya was captured by Israel's Golani Brigade in Operation Hiram on October 30, 1948. It was not directly assaulted, but as the brigade advanced north from the Arab town of Eilabun in the south towards Sa'sa' in the north, Farradiyya was surrounded by Israeli forces on all sides.

Prior to its capture, in early May, Arabs from Akbara and az-Zahiriyya took refuge in the village. Because it was not assaulted, many of Farradiyya's residents remained in the village until February 1949. It was on December 15, 1948, that Israeli authorities decided to expel the remaining 261 inhabitants, but the plan was executed in February. Israeli forces evicted most of the villagers to other Arab villages in the Galilee under their control or to the northern West Bank.

In 1949, an Israeli kibbutz named Parod, after the village's ancient name, was founded on village lands, 300 meters (980 ft) east of the village site, and in 1950, the village of Shefer was established on Farradiyya's northern lands.

In 1992 the village site was described:

The site is deserted and covered with wild thorns, trees, and piles of stones from the destroyed homes. Cactuses grow on the land around the site, which is mostly utilized for grazing animals.

=== Archaeological finds ===
Excavations conducted at the site in 1996 have revealed columbaria and burial caves (kokhim) dating back to the Early–Late Roman and Early Byzantine periods. Ceramics have also been found here from the Byzantine era. In 2010, a survey of the site was conducted by Cinamon Gilad and Baron Hendrik on behalf of the Israel Antiquities Authority (IAA).

== See also ==
- Depopulated Palestinian locations in Israel

== Gallery ==
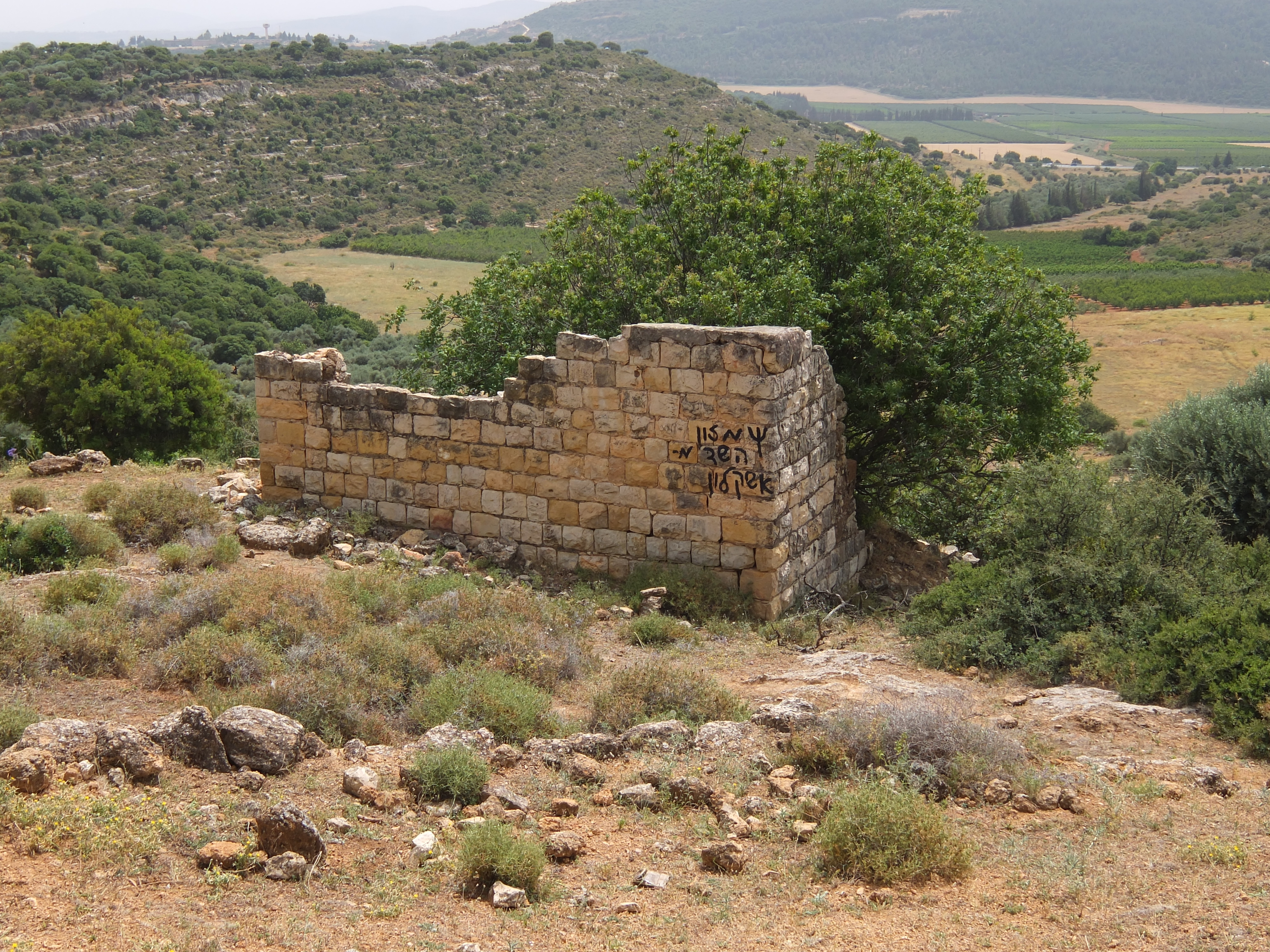
Abandoned house in Farradiyya

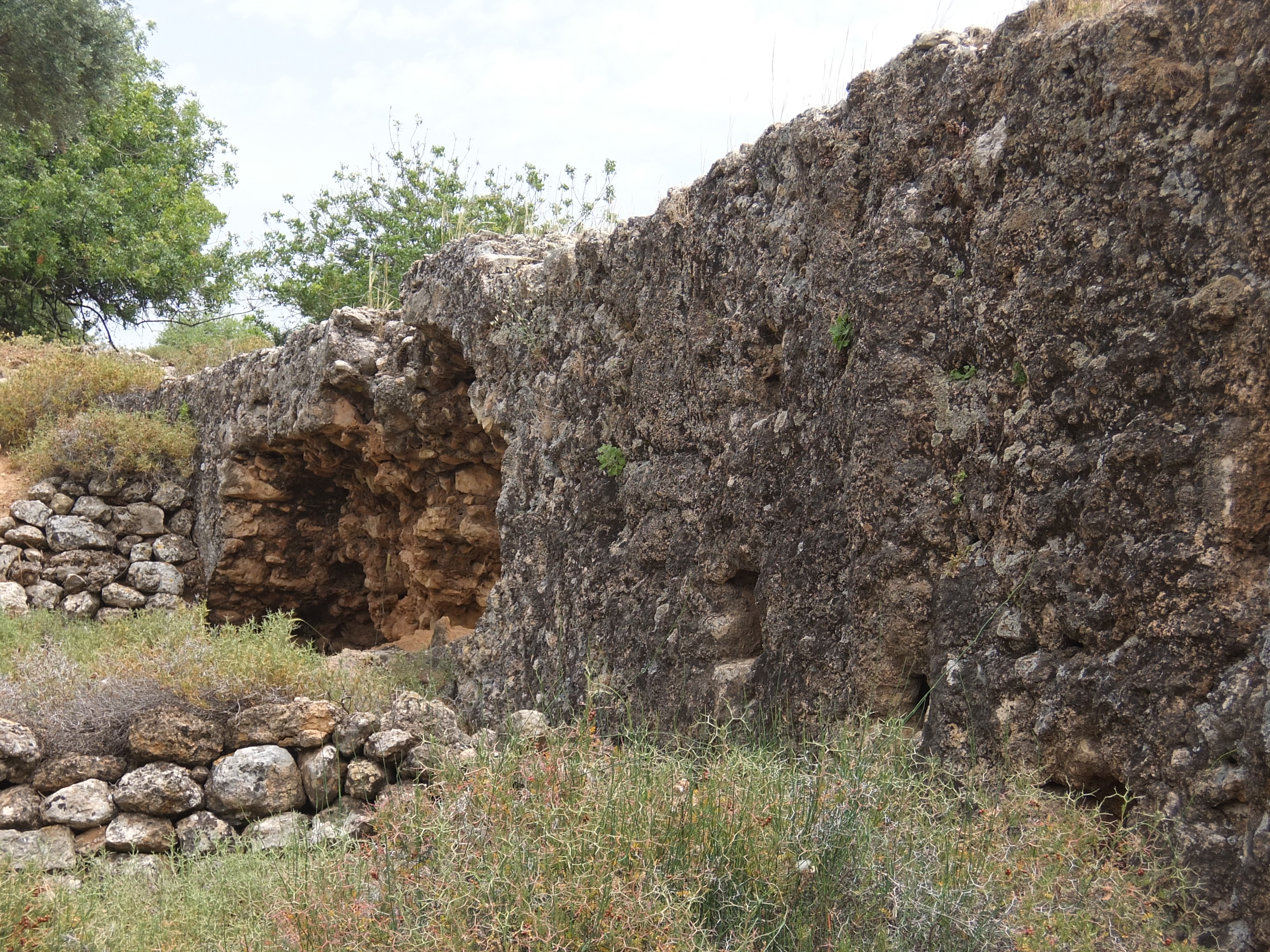
Remains of ancient wall in Farradiyya

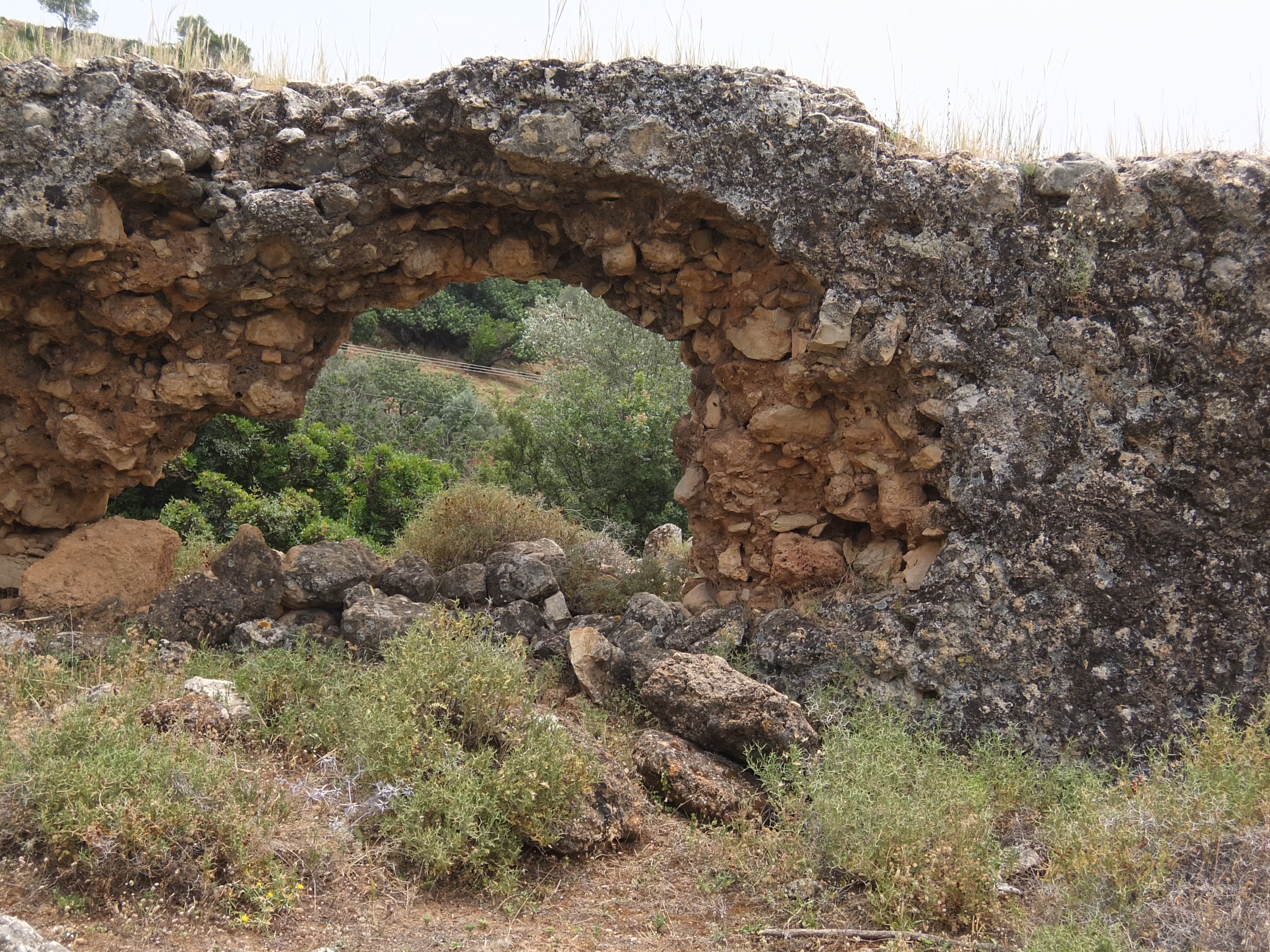
Broken wall

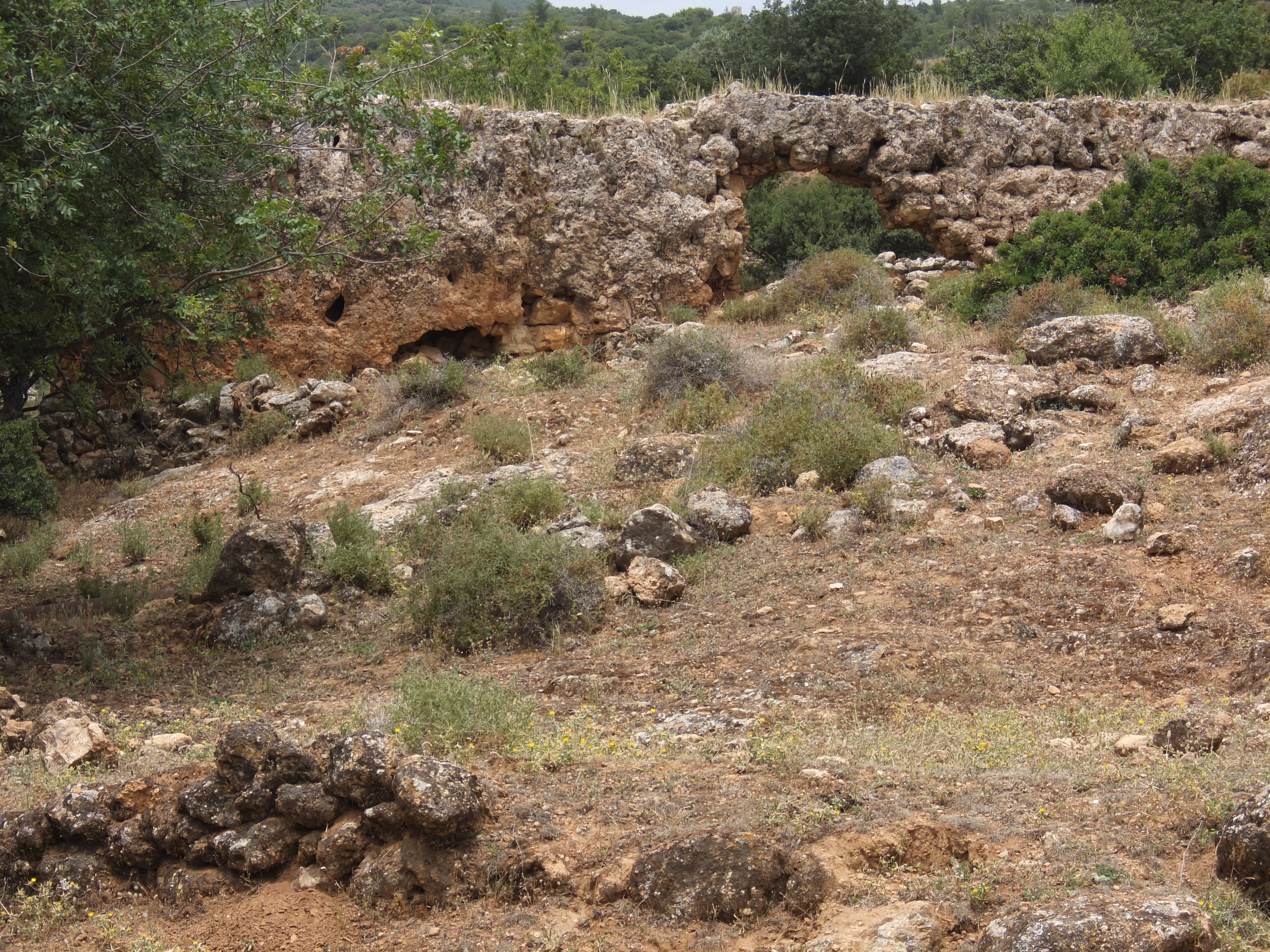
Ancient walled structure in Farradiyya

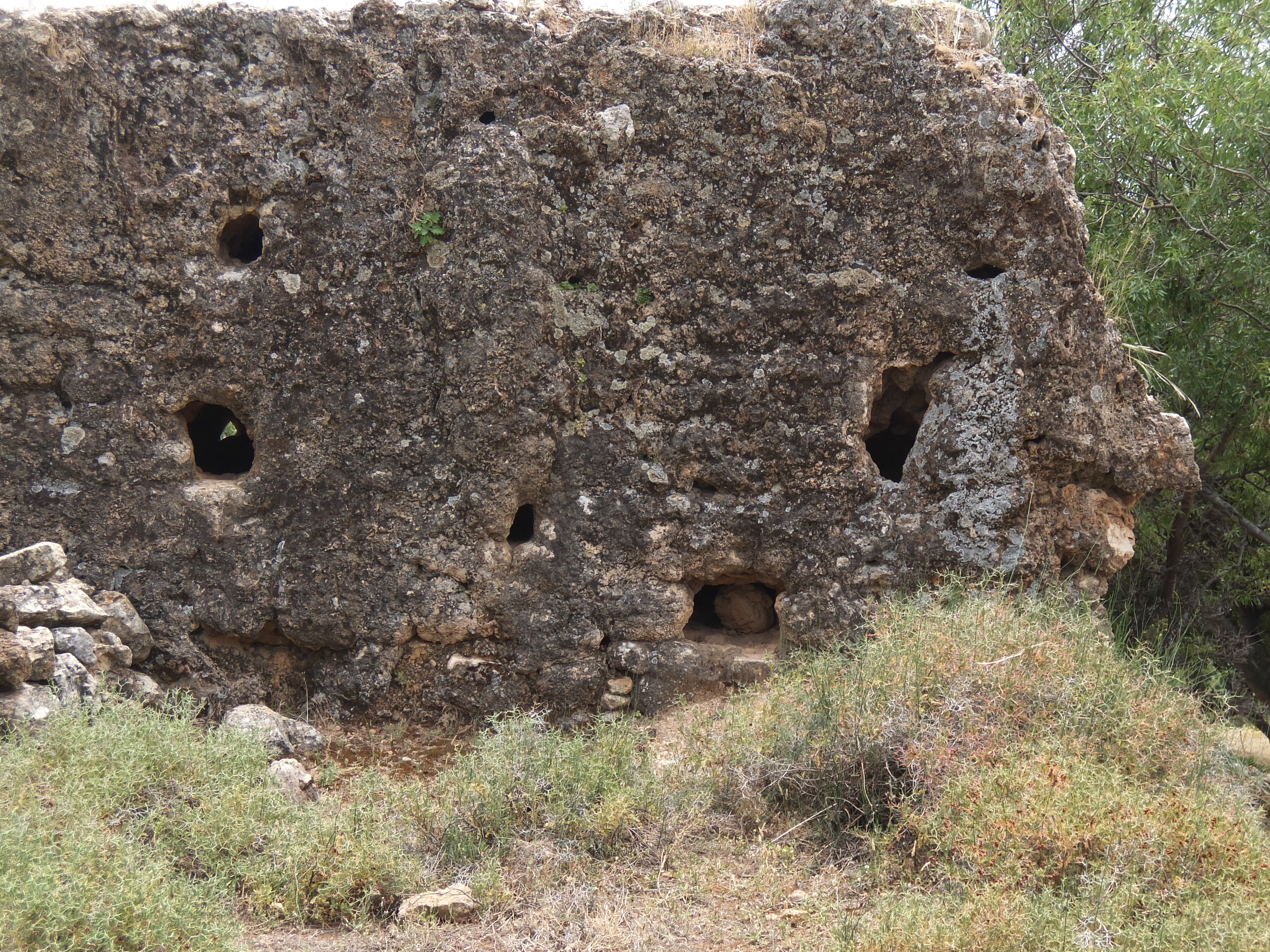
Old wall

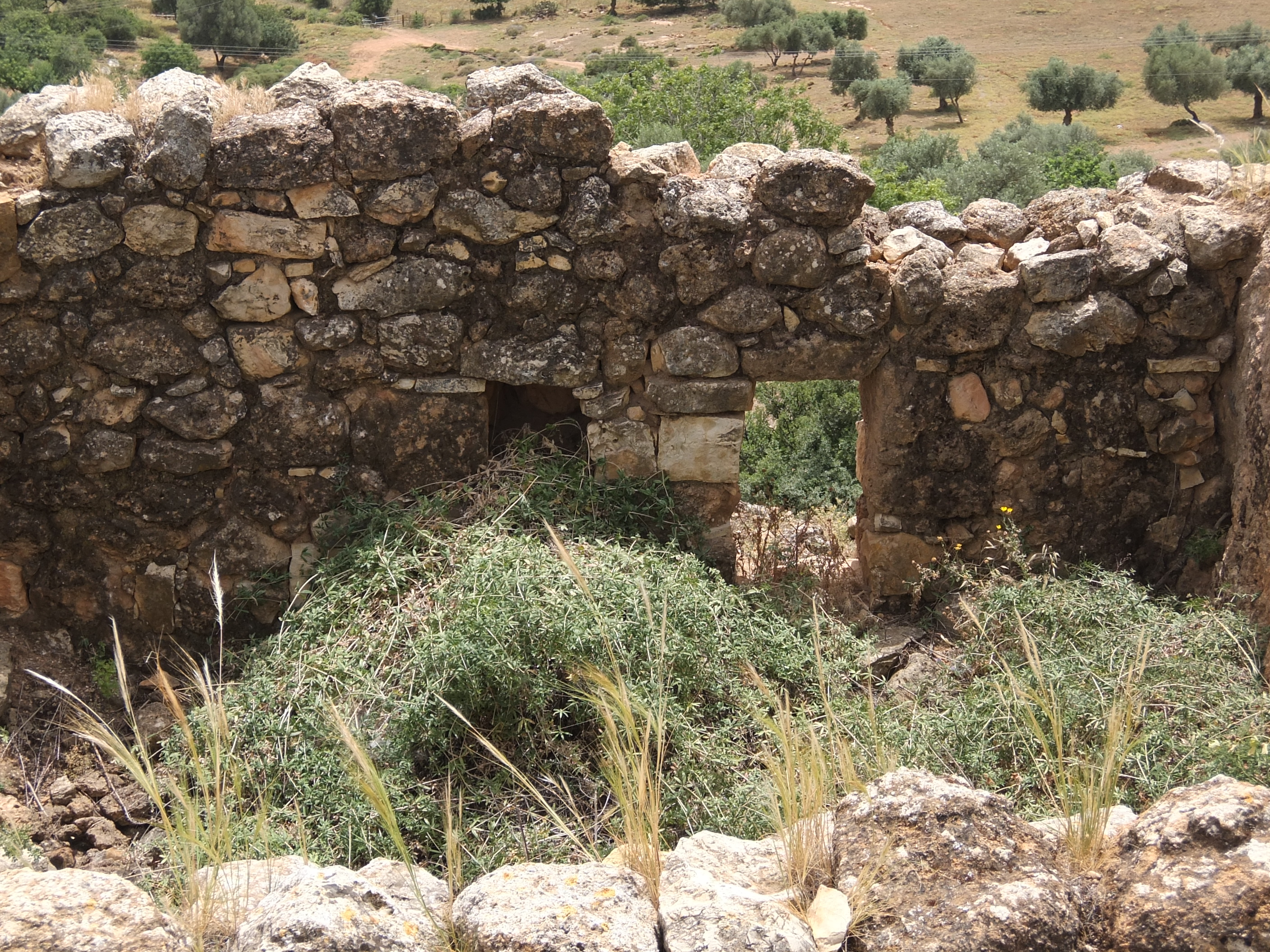
Ruined house in Farradiyya

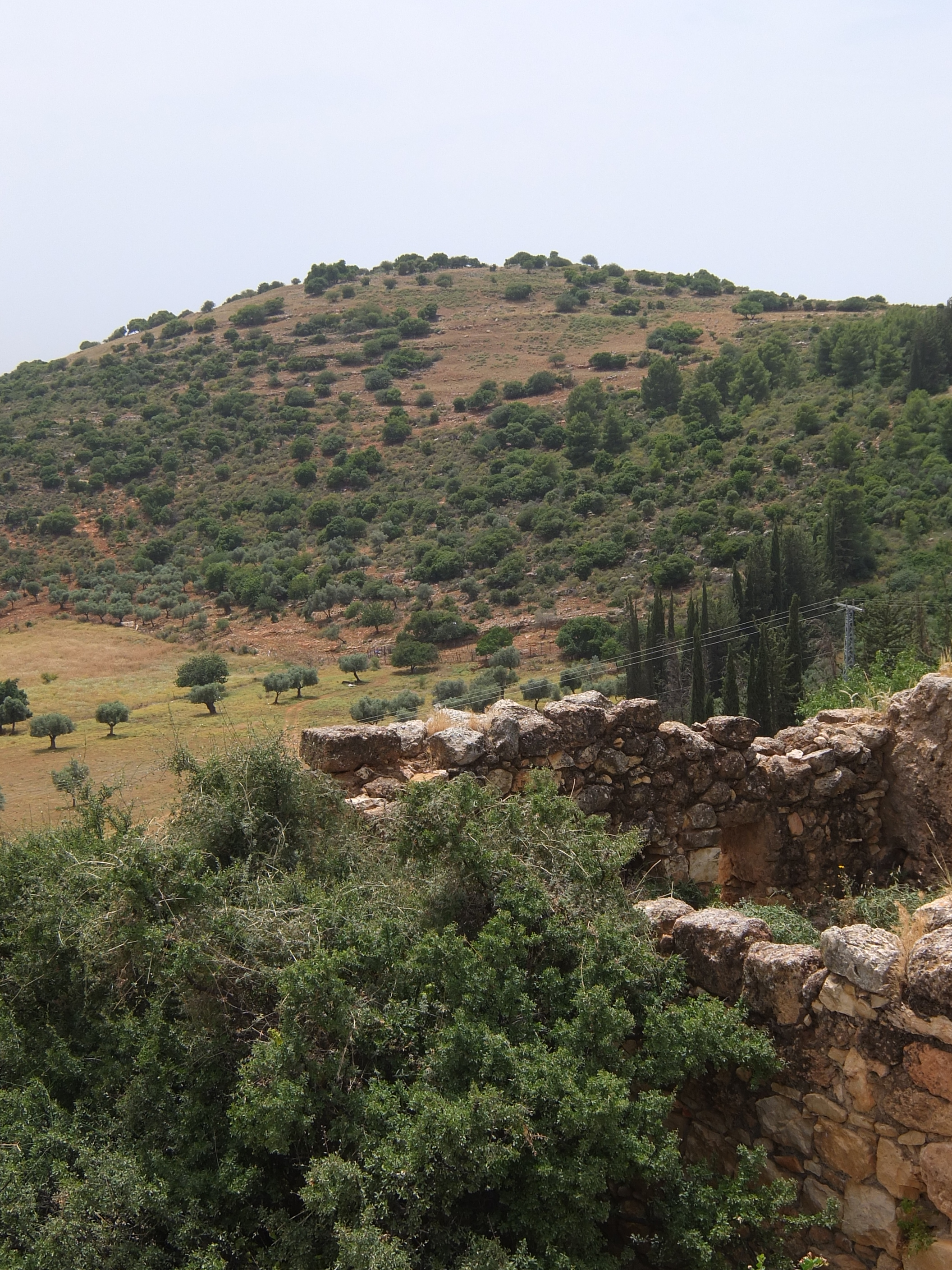
Deserted house in Farradiyya, with the hilltop ruin of Khirbet Abu esh-Sheba seen in distance

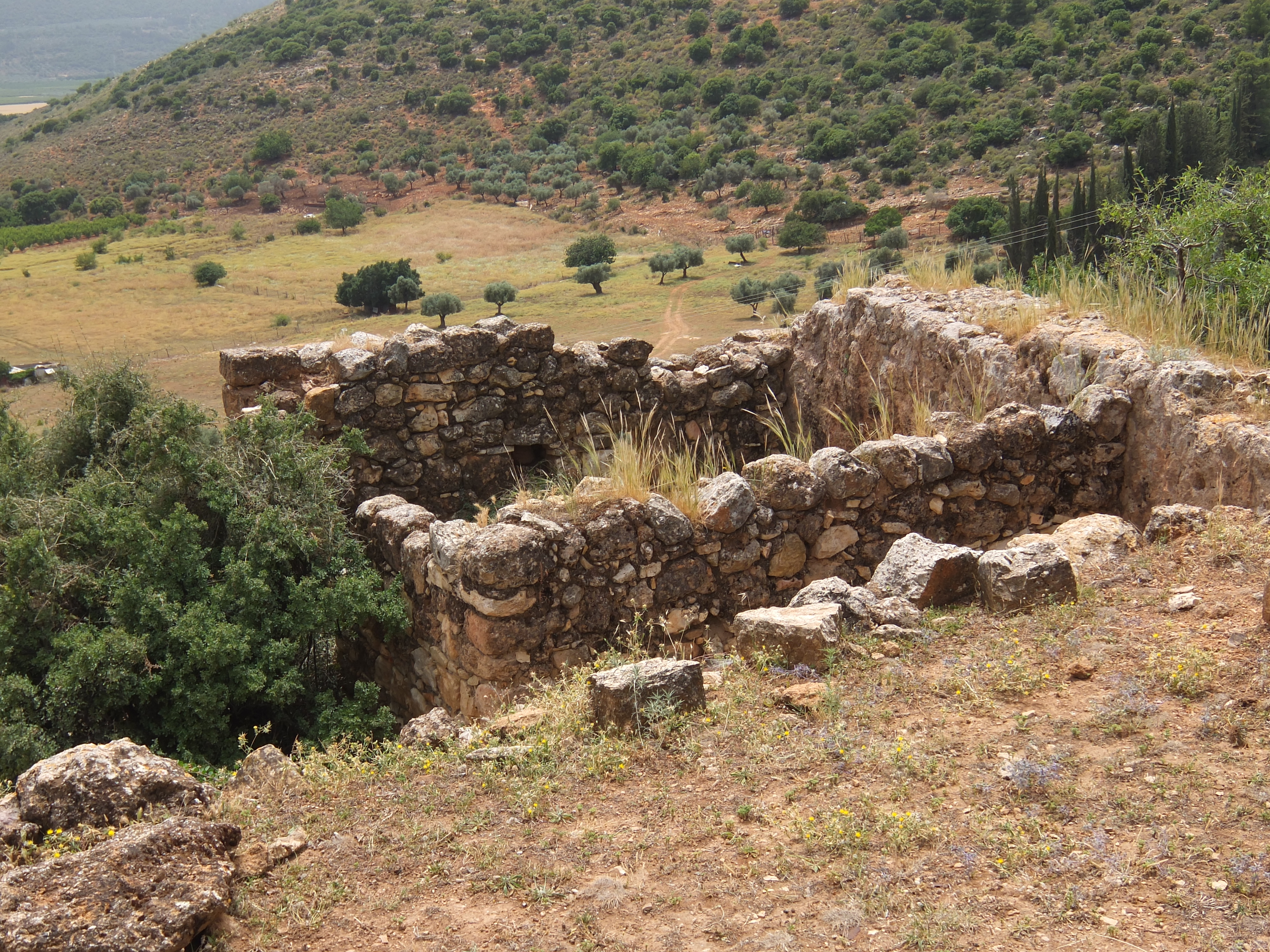
Village of Farradiyya

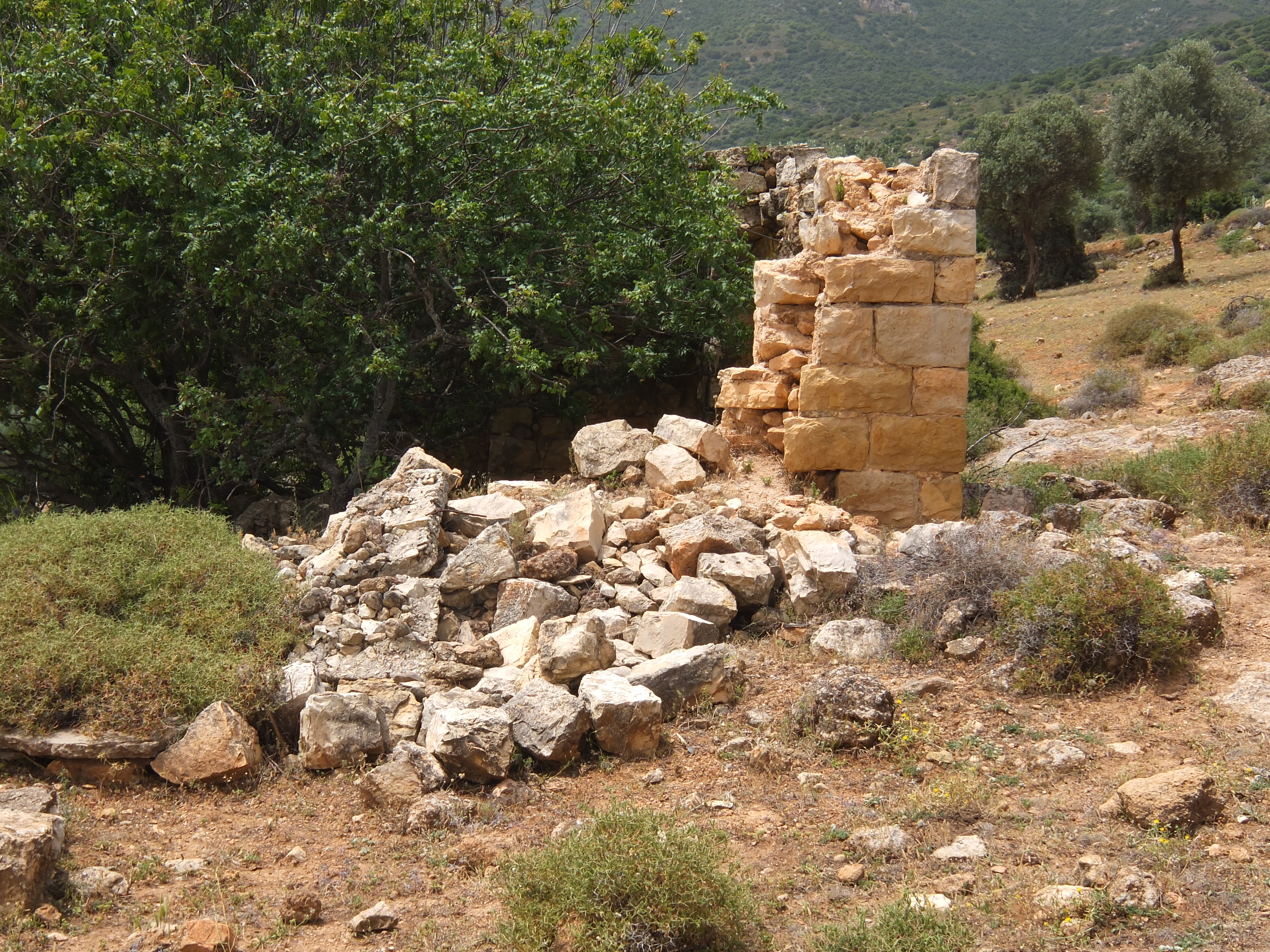
Ruined house in Farradiyya

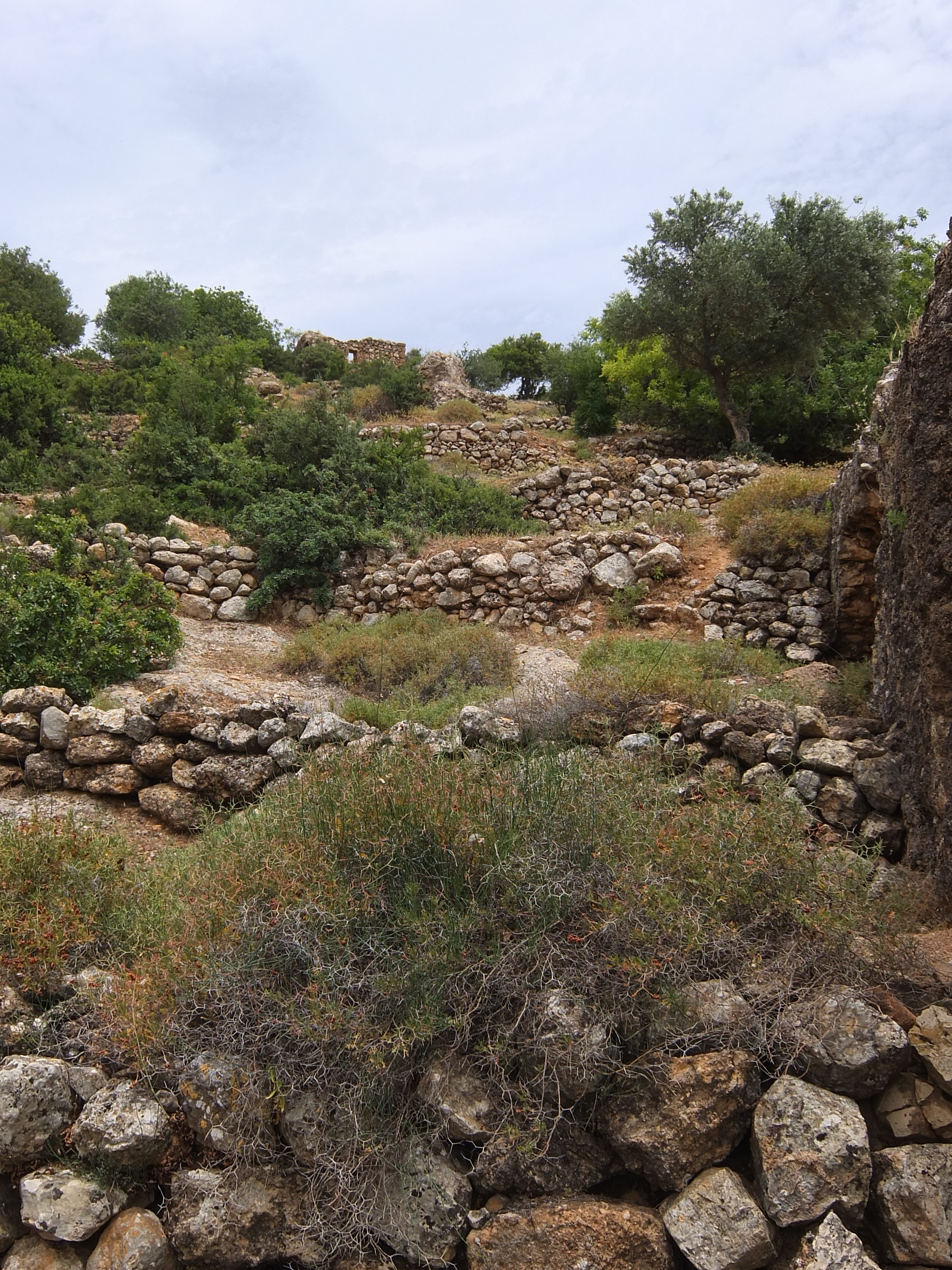
Farradiyya in Galilee

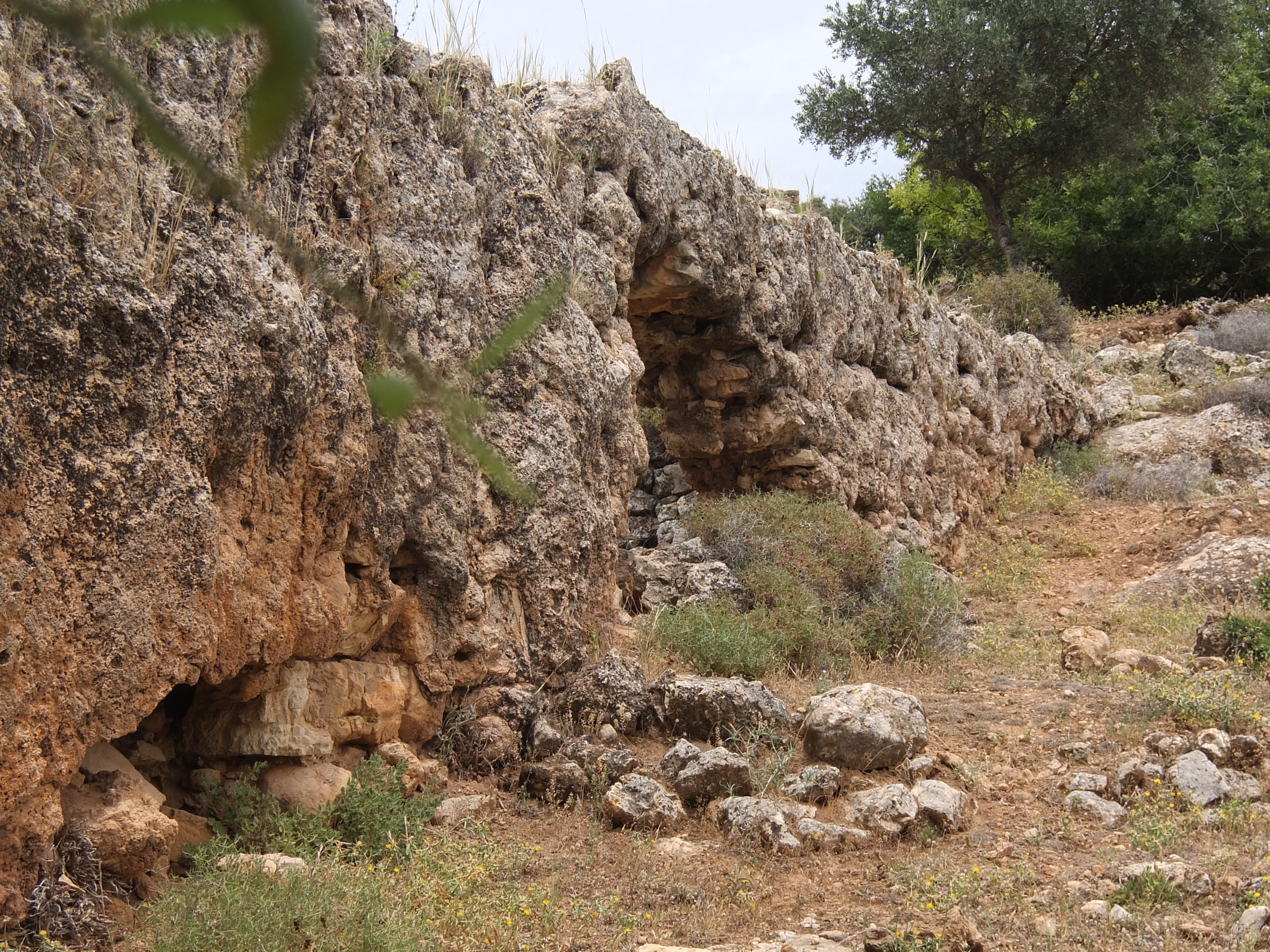
Ancient walled structure

== Bibliography ==
- Barron, J.B., ed. (1923). Palestine: Report and General Abstracts of the Census of 1922. Government of Palestine.
- Conder, C.R.; Kitchener, H.H. (1881). The Survey of Western Palestine: Memoirs of the Topography, Orography, Hydrography, and Archaeology. Vol. 1. London: Committee of the Palestine Exploration Fund.
- Dauphin, C. (1998). La Palestine byzantine, Peuplement et Populations. BAR International Series 726 (in French). Vol. III : Catalogue. Oxford: Archeopress. ISBN 0-860549-05-4.
- Government of Palestine, Department of Statistics (1945). Village Statistics, April, 1945.
- Guérin, V. (1880). Description Géographique Historique et Archéologique de la Palestine (in French). Vol. 3: Galilee, pt. 2. Paris: L'Imprimerie Nationale.
- Hadawi, S. (1970). Village Statistics of 1945: A Classification of Land and Area ownership in Palestine. Palestine Liberation Organization Research Center.
- Hütteroth, W.-D.; Abdulfattah, K. (1977). Historical Geography of Palestine, Transjordan and Southern Syria in the Late 16th Century. Erlanger Geographische Arbeiten, Sonderband 5. Erlangen, Germany: Vorstand der Fränkischen Geographischen Gesellschaft. ISBN 3-920405-41-2.
- Karmon, Y. (1960). "An Analysis of Jacotin's Map of Palestine" (PDF). Israel Exploration Journal. 10 (3, 4): 155–173, 244–253. Archived from the original (PDF) on 2019-12-22.
- Khalidi, W. (1992). All That Remains: The Palestinian Villages Occupied and Depopulated by Israel in 1948. Washington D.C.: Institute for Palestine Studies. ISBN 0-88728-224-5.
- Leibner, Uzi (2009). Settlement and History in Hellenistic, Roman, and Byzantine Galilee. Mohr Siebeck. ISBN 9783161498718.
- Le Strange, G. (1890). Palestine Under the Moslems: A Description of Syria and the Holy Land from A.D. 650 to 1500. Committee of the Palestine Exploration Fund.
- Mills, E., ed. (1932). Census of Palestine 1931. Population of Villages, Towns and Administrative Areas. Jerusalem: Government of Palestine.
- Morris, B. (2004). The Birth of the Palestinian Refugee Problem Revisited. Cambridge University Press. ISBN 0-521-00967-7.
- Neubauer, A. (1868). La géographie du Talmud : mémoire couronné par l'Académie des inscriptions et belles-lettres (in French). Paris: Lévy.
- Palmer, E.H. (1881). The Survey of Western Palestine: Arabic and English Name Lists Collected During the Survey by Lieutenants Conder and Kitchener, R. E. Transliterated and Explained by E.H. Palmer. Committee of the Palestine Exploration Fund.
- Petersen, Andrew (2001). A Gazetteer of Buildings in Muslim Palestine (British Academy Monographs in Archaeology). Vol. 1. Oxford University Press. ISBN 978-0-19-727011-0.
- Rhode, H. (1979). Administration and Population of the Sancak of Safed in the Sixteenth Century. Columbia University. Archived from the original on 2019-04-20.
- Schumacher, G. (1888). "Population list of the Liwa of Akka". Quarterly Statement - Palestine Exploration Fund. 20: 169–191.
