= Or HaGanuz =

Or HaGanuz: אוֹר הַגָּנוּז (Hebrew)

Hebrew transcription(s)
  - Unofficial: Or Ganuz
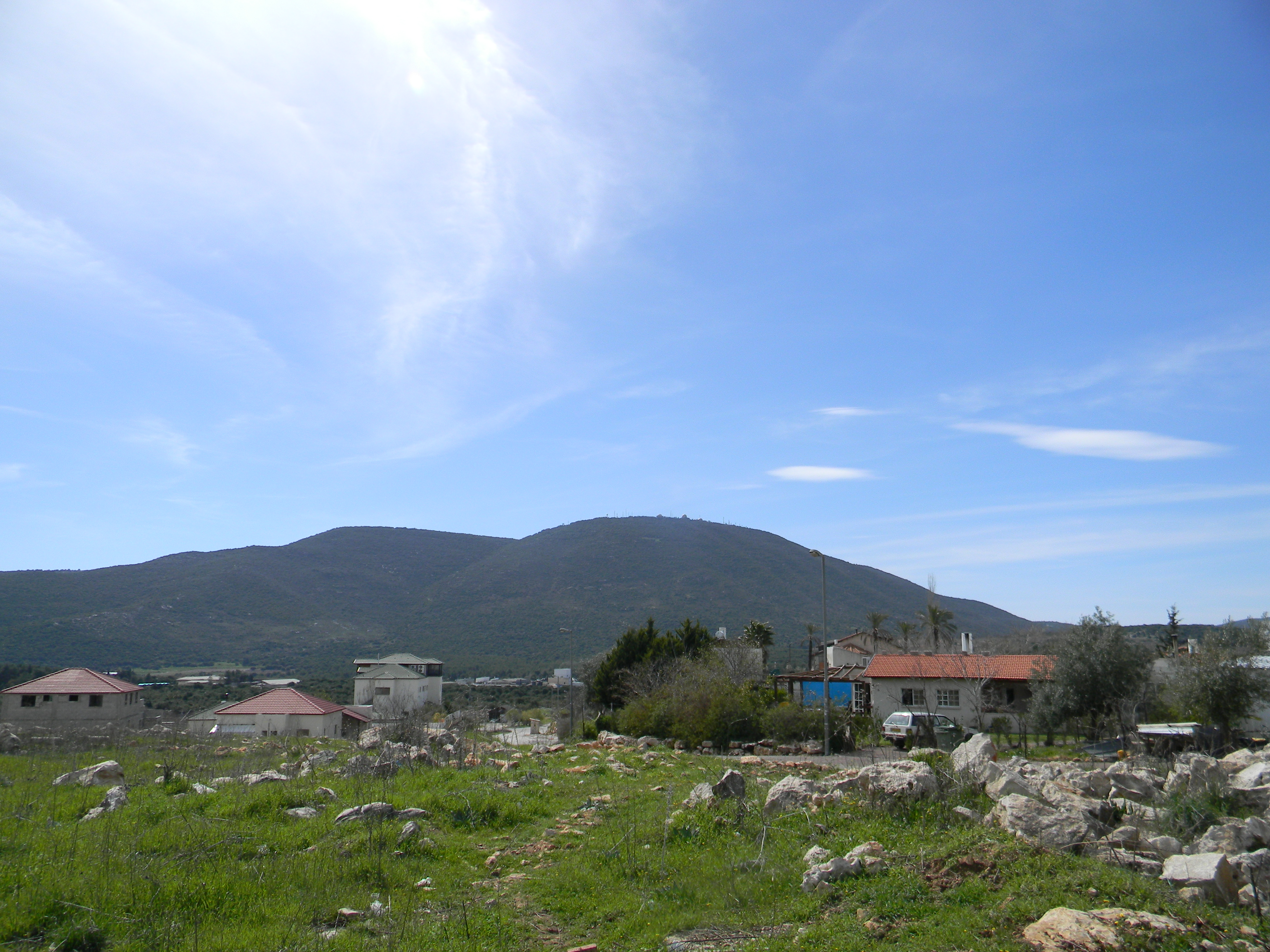

- Location within Northeast Israel
- Coordinates: 33°0′18″N 35°26′44″E
- Country: Israel
- District: Northern
- Subdistrict: Safed
- Council: Merom HaGalil
- Affiliation: Amana
- Founded: 1989
- Founder: Gush Emunim
- Population (2024): 705

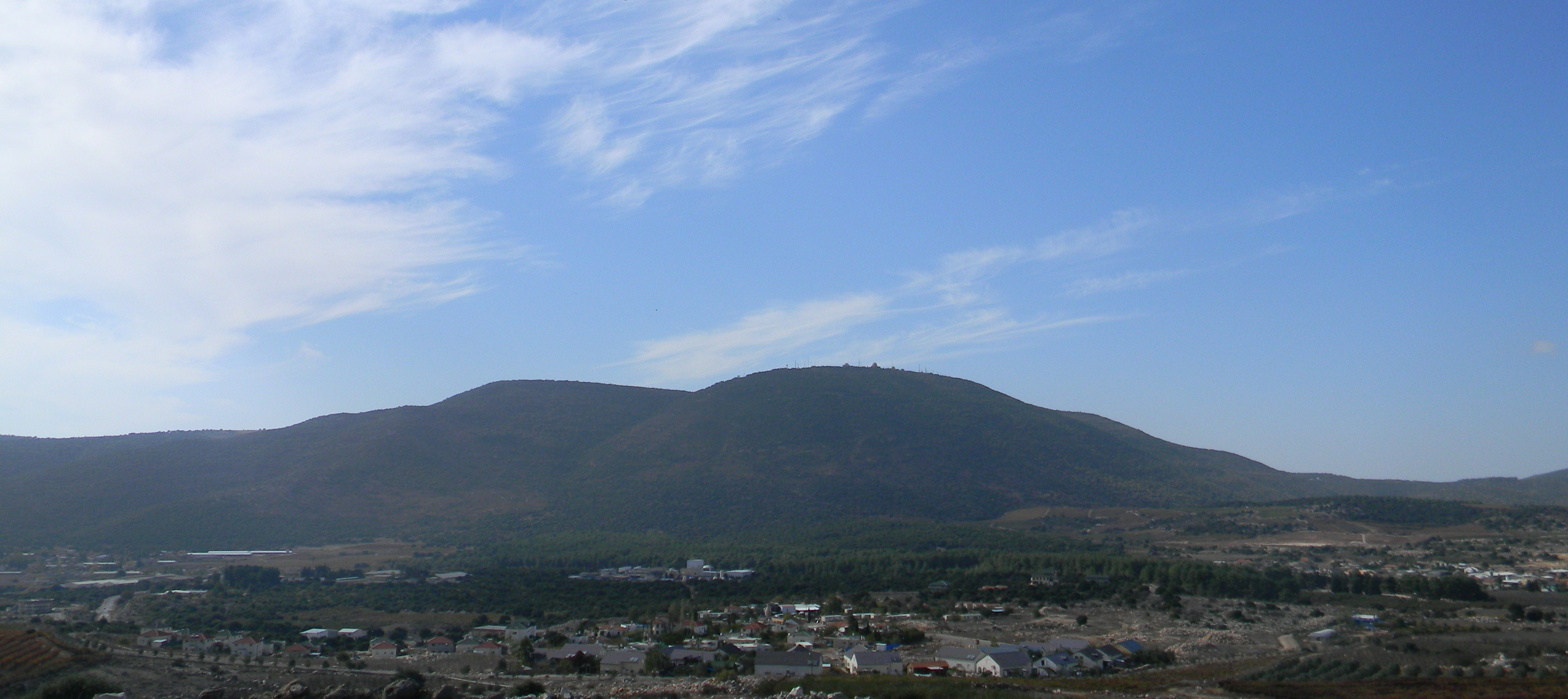
Or HaGanuz

Or HaGanuz (Hebrew: אוֹר הַגָּנוּז, lit. Hidden Light), sometimes Or Ganuz, is a community settlement in northern Israel. Located in the eastern Upper Galilee, about six kilometers northwest of the town of Safed, it falls under the jurisdiction of Merom HaGalil Regional Council. In 2024 it had a population of 705.

== History ==
The Orthodox settlement was founded in 1989 by a group of newly religious baal teshuva Jews with the help of Amana, the settlement arm of Gush Emunim, even though the village is located within the Green Line. The name is derived from the kabbalah which refers to the original light described in the Bible that was the first act of Creation (Genesis 1:2).

== Education ==
Several formal educational institutions operate in the village including a preschool, a kindergarten, the Ginzei-Shimon Talmud Torah, a midrasha for women, and the Elima college of alternative medicine combining Chinese acupuncture with Jewish spirituality and kabbalah.

== Economy ==
The original founders decided to concentrate on employment that does not necessitate being close to the country's main population center. The village offers a range of holiday bed and breakfast guest houses operated by individual families, tours to graves of tzaddikim, a publishing house for religious and kabbalistic literature (Or Da'at), a printing press (Da'at), and a matza factory. Or HaGanuz Boutique Winery is also located there.

The village is a tourist location for pilgrims visiting the tomb of Rabbi Shimeon bar Yochai in nearby Meron.
