= Kfar Hoshen =

Moshav in northern Israel

Kfar Hoshen: כפר חושן (Hebrew)
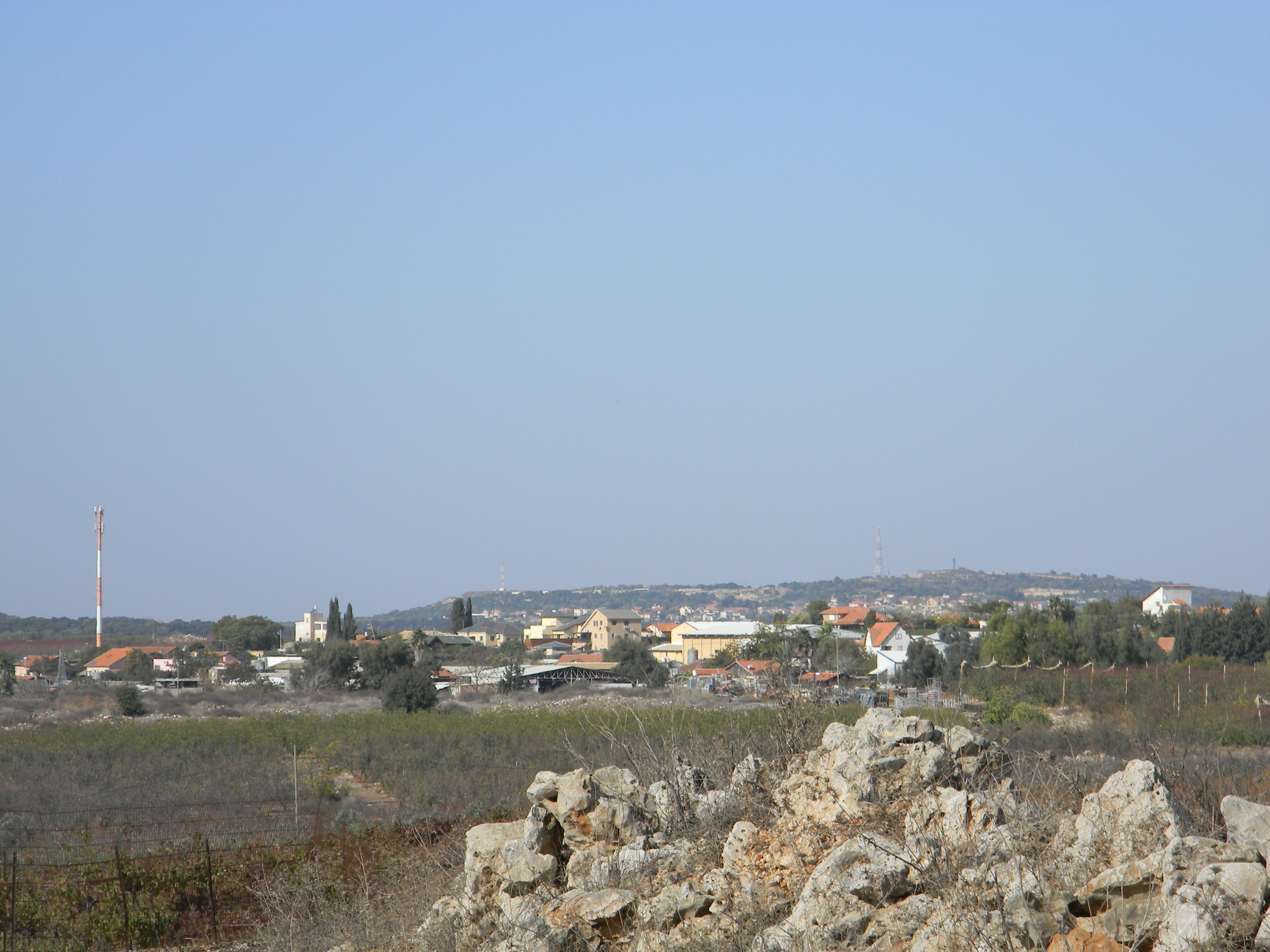

- Location within Northeast Israel
- Coordinates: 33°0′44″N 35°26′29″E
- Country: Israel
- District: Northern
- Subdistrict: Safed
- Council: Merom HaGalil
- Affiliation: Moshavim Movement
- Founded: 1949
- Founder: Bulgarian-Jewish immigrants
- Population (2024): 914

Kfar Hoshen (Hebrew: כפר חושן), also known as Safsufa (ספסופה), is a moshav in northern Israel. Located around four kilometres north of Meron, it falls under the jurisdiction of Merom HaGalil Regional Council. In 2024 it had a population of 914.

== History ==
The moshav was founded in 1949 by immigrants to Israel from Bulgaria and with the support of the Moshavim Movement. The moshav was located near the Palestinian village of Safsaf, whose residents fled to Lebanon after the Safsaf massacre in October 1948 during the 1948 Arab-Israeli war. The population was added in early years of the state by Jewish immigrants from Yemen and Aden, and starting in 1953 immigrants from Morocco and Tunisia also came.

The original name "Safsufa" is based on an identical name found in the Jerusalem Talmud, whose name is preserved in the village Safsaf; the Hebrew word "Safsaf" means an area where fruits ripen later than usual.

The residents work in agriculture and tourism.

== Notable residents ==
- Aryeh Deri
