= Inbar =

Kibbutz in the Galilee, northern Israel

Inbar: ענבר (Hebrew)
- Etymology: Amber
- Location Inbar (Israel)
- Coordinates: 32°54′37″N 35°25′23″E
- Country: Israel
- District: Northern
- Council: Merom HaGalil
- Founded: 1994
- Area: 25 dunams (2.5 ha; 6.2 acres)
- Population: 25
  - Density: 1,000/km^{2} (2,600/sq mi)
- Website: www.inbar.co.il

Inbar (Hebrew: ענבר) (lit. "amber") is a kibbutz near Karmiel in the Galilee in northern Israel. Inbar is the country's smallest kibbutz, with only about 10 members.

== History ==
Inbar is situated on the site of the biblical village of Kfar Hananya, which Jews continuously inhabited from the First Temple period until the 16th century. The Biblical village was situated along the banks of Nahal Tzalmon and was known for its high-quality earthenware pottery. Rabbi Halafta, one of the great interpreters of the Mishnah, lived there in the Talmudic era and is buried there. In the 16th century, the community was abandoned, and its residents moved to Peki'in, where a larger Jewish community was already established. At the end of the 1970s, as part of the HaMitzpim program, a temporary camp was erected for workers who were building moshavim nearby. The remnants of the buildings used in the camp were improved by community members when they moved in on Yom Ha'atzmaut in May 1994.

== Economy ==
The economy of Inbar is based on tourism. The community runs an 18-room guesthouse and country lodge.
