= Merom HaGalil Regional Council =

Coordinates: 33°0′N 35°26′E

Merom HaGalil מרום הגליל
- Regional council (from 1950)
- Interactive map of Merom HaGalil
- Country: Israel
- District: Northern
- Subdistrict: Safed, Acre
- Natural region: Eastern Upper Galilee, Central Lower Galilee, Elon, Karmiel

Government
  - Head of Municipality: Amit Super

Area
  - Total: 178,000 dunams (178 km^{2}; 69 sq mi)

Population (2024)
  - Total: 16,184
  - Density: 90.9/km^{2} (235/sq mi)
- Website: www.mrg.org.il

The Merom HaGalil Regional Council (Hebrew: מועצה אזורית מרום הגליל, Mo'atza Azorit Merom HaGalil) is a regional council in the northern Galilee of northern Israel. The regional council was established in 1950. The head of the council is Shlomo Levi.

== List of settlements ==
This regional council provides various municipal services for various villages within its territory including moshavim, a kibbutz, and other types of settlements:

Community settlements

- Amuka
- Bar Yochai
- Birya
- Inbar
- Kalanit
- Kfar Hananya
- Livnim
- Or HaGanuz

Kibbutzim

- Parod

Moshavim

- Alma
- Amirim
- Avivim
- Dovev
- Dalton
- Hazon
- Kerem Ben Zimra
- Kfar Hoshen
- Kfar Shamai
- Meron
- Safsufa
- Shefer
- Shezor
- Tefahot

Minority villages

- Ein el-Asad (Druze)
- Rehaniya (Circassian)

Unrecognised

- Kadita

== Demographics ==
Historical population
Year	Pop.	±%
1972	5,600	—
1983	6,800	+21.4%
1995	8,800	+29.4%
2008	11,700	+33.0%
2022	15,539	+32.8%
2024	16,184	+4.2%

== Voting Patterns ==
In the 2022 election, 72 percent of voters in the regional council voted for the parties of the right-wing coalition led by Benjamin Netanyahu, while 26 percent voted for the parties of the center-left coalition led by Yair Lapid and 2 percent voted for the Arab parties.

In the 2026 election, 65 percent of voters in the regional council voted for the parties of the right-wing coalition led by Benjamin Netanyahu, while 28 percent voted for the parties of the center-left coalition led by Gadi Eisenkot and 2.4 percent voted for the Arab parties. An additional 2 percent voted for the Reservists, and 1.8 percent voted for Amcha Yisrael. Voter turnout increased 14 percent from the 2022 election.
