= Rehaniya =

Circassian town in Israel

Rehaniya Hebrew: רִיחָאנִיָּה Arabic: الريحانية Adyghe: Рихьаные
- Local council
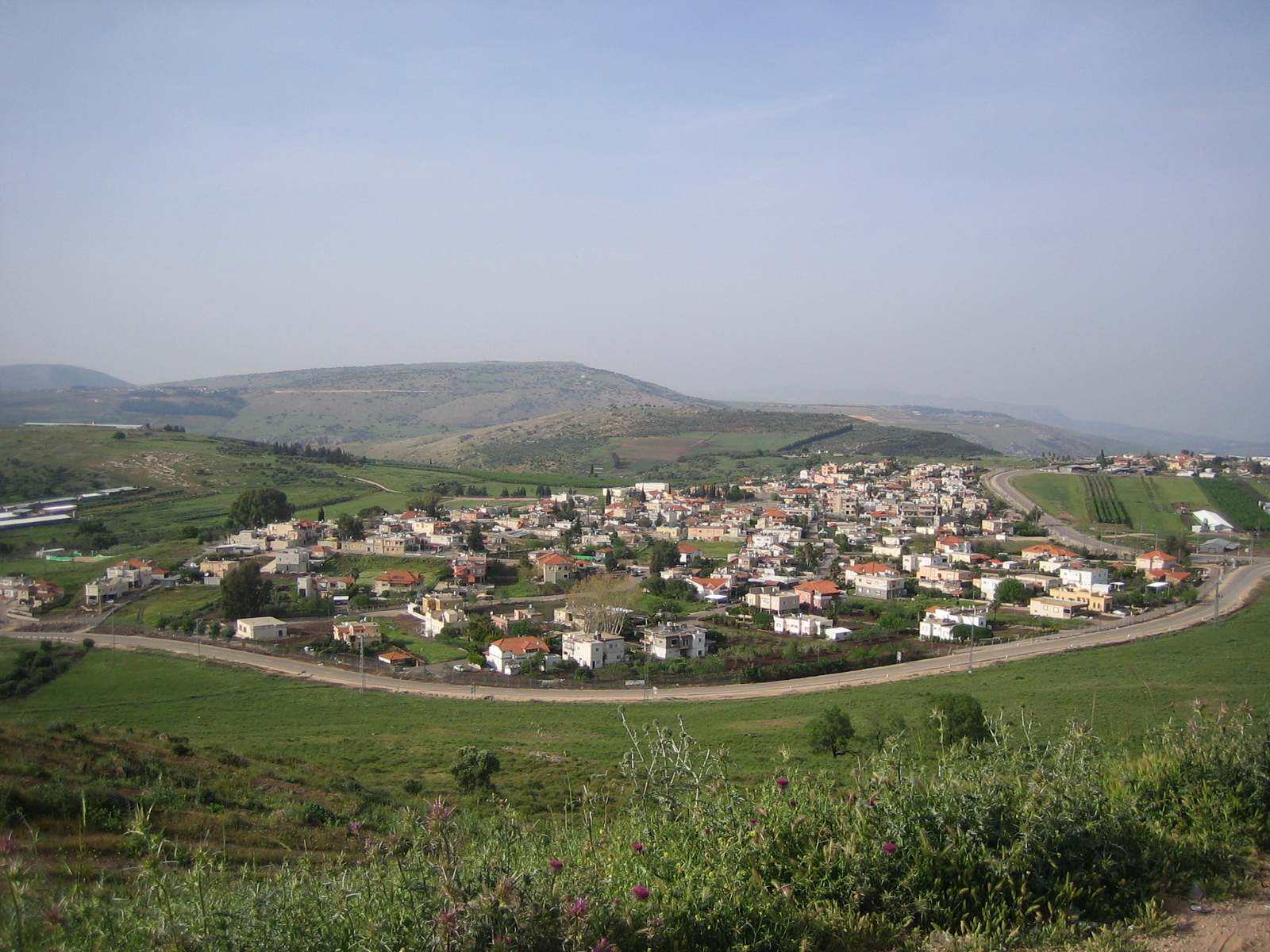

- Location within Northeast Israel Location within Israel
- Coordinates: 33°2′54″N 35°29′15″E
- Country: Israel
- District: Northern
- Subdistrict: Safed
- Council: Merom HaGalil
- Founded: 1878

Population (2024)
  - Total: 1,188
- Name meaning: Myrtle

Rehaniya (Hebrew: רִיחָנִיָּה, Arabic: الريحانية, Adyghe: Рихьаные [rəjħaːnəja]), also spelled Reihaniyye, is a Circassian town in northern Israel. It is one of the only two Circassian towns in Israel, the other being Kfar Kama. Located about 8 km north of Safed, it falls under the jurisdiction of Merom HaGalil Regional Council. In 2024, it had a population of 1,188.

== History ==
The Circassians arrived in the Middle East after they were pushed out of their homeland in the North Caucasus as the result of the Circassian genocide. The Circassians, who fought during the long period wherein the Russians captured the northern Caucasus, were massacred and expelled by Tsarist Russia from the North-Western Caucasus mountains. The Ottoman Empire absorbed them in their territory, and settled them in sparsely populated areas, including the Galilee in Beirut Vilayet (Ottoman Syria).

The area where they settled was called Burak Alma ("Pools of Alma").

The village of Rehaniya was established in 1873, but only in 1878 did Circassian families arrive from the Abzakh tribe in the northern Caucasus, a region where today is located the Adygea and Karachay–Cherkessia in the Russian Federation. The village itself was established in 1880 by 66 families, most of whom were Abzakhs.

=== British Mandate era ===
In the 1922 census of Palestine conducted by the British Mandate authorities, Rihania had a population of 211; all Muslims, increasing slightly in the 1931 census to 222, still all Muslims, in a total of 53 houses.

In the 1945 census by the Mandate, the population was 290 people (all Muslims) and the land area was 6,137 dunums. 271 dunums of land were irrigated or used for orchards; 4,725 dunums were allocated to cereal farming, while 89 dunams were built up (urban) land.

=== 1948, aftermath ===
In 1948, during Operation Hiram (29–31 October), the villagers surrendered to the advancing Israeli army and were allowed to remain in the village. In November 1949, a plan to evict the villagers, as well as those from five other villages along the border with Lebanon, was presented to the Israeli cabinet. The proposals were strongly supported by the IDF, but the plan was vetoed by the Foreign Ministry who were worried about the possible international response. The village remained under Martial Law until 1966.

Due to the village's location on the border of Lebanon, it maintained active ties with villages across the border. In 1953, due to increased tensions between the community and the state, authorities engaged in a security campaign, surrounding the village and conducting house searches. The contraband found convinced the authorities that the villagers had to be evicted. The decision was made to evict the villagers to Kfar Kama, another Circassian village. This caused great consternation among two communities - the first was the Galilee regional council, who saw in the increase in the Muslim population of Kfar Kama ’uncalled for and unwanted new residents in the region’ who protested the increase in the population of Muslims in the lower Galilee, the second were the villagers of Kfar Kama themselves, angered by what they saw as a "slight on their honour and about 40 prepared to emigrate to Turkey." Faced with this opposition, the authorities decided to relent.

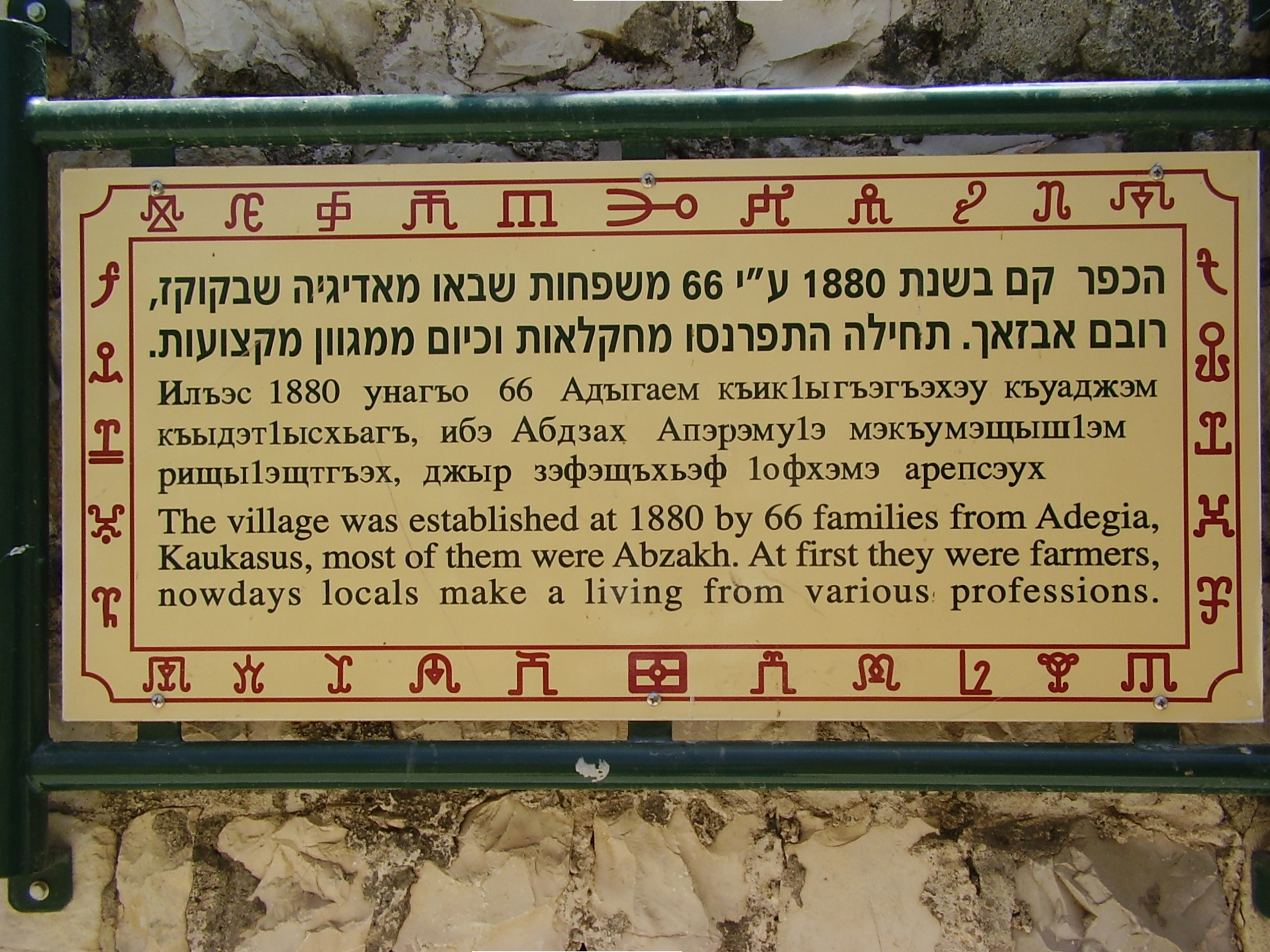
Historical plaque in Rehaniya

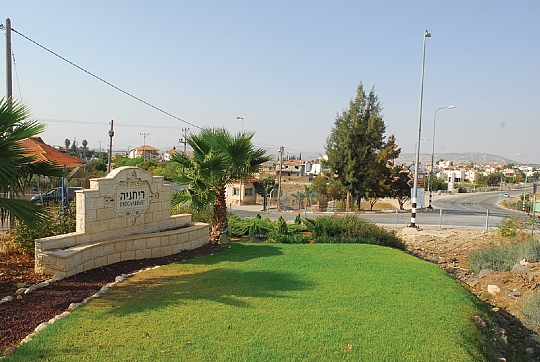
Entrance to Rehaniya

The villagers of Rihaniya faced expulsion yet again in 1955, when "after villagers were suspected of assisting Lebanese gangs that had carried out an attack on a bus in Meron and had placed mines in Alma, Israel. A considerable number of Bedouin tents had also been established around Rihaniyya and according to Ha’aretz, it was ‘beyond any doubt’ that they were used as a base for smuggling activities and were included in the intelligence networks of neighbouring countries. A top secret report on the village written in 1956 indicated that its residents were considered unfriendly, the security services had great difficulty recruiting collaborators among the villagers, and enemy intelligence could comfortably operate among them. Altogether Rihaniyya’s border location made it difficult to supervise. About 20 per cent of the 70 male residents of Rihaniyya were suspected of giving shelter to infiltrators and smuggling"

== State of Israel ==
Rehaniya is one of two predominantly-Circassian villages in Israel. The other one is Kfar Kama. The Circassians are Muslims who, unlike the main Israeli Arab Muslim minority, are conscripted to perform military service in the Israeli Defense Forces. Rehaniya reached local council status in 1950. The village was built in the traditional Circassian style, which has its roots in the Caucasus, and is called "walled village": the houses are built next to one another and form a protective wall around the city, whose remnants remain until 2008. In the village there is a mosque in the style of Circassian mosques in the Caucasus, and substantially different from Arab mosques. Also, the village contains a museum and a center for Circassian heritage.

== See also ==
- Circassians in Israel

== Bibliography ==
- Barron, J.B., ed. (1923). Palestine: Report and General Abstracts of the Census of 1922. Government of Palestine.
- Geller, Randall S. (1 May 2012). "The Recruitment and Conscription of the Circassian Community into the Israel Defence Forces, 1948–58". Middle Eastern Studies. 48 (3): 387–399. doi:10.1080/00263206.2012.661722. S2CID 143772360.
- Government of Palestine, Department of Statistics (1945). Village Statistics, April, 1945.
- Hadawi, S. (1970). "Village Statistics of 1945: A Classification of Land and Area ownership in Palestine". Palestine Liberation Organization Research Center.
- Mills, E., ed. (1932). Census of Palestine 1931. Population of Villages, Towns and Administrative Areas. Jerusalem: Government of Palestine.
- Morris, B. (1987). The Birth of the Palestinian refugee problem, 1947-1949. Cambridge University Press. ISBN 0-521-33028-9.
- Palmer, E.H. (1881). The Survey of Western Palestine: Arabic and English Name Lists Collected During the Survey by Lieutenants Conder and Kitchener, R. E. Transliterated and Explained by E.H. Palmer. Committee of the Palestine Exploration Fund.
