= Amirim =

Amirim: אֲמִירִים (Hebrew)
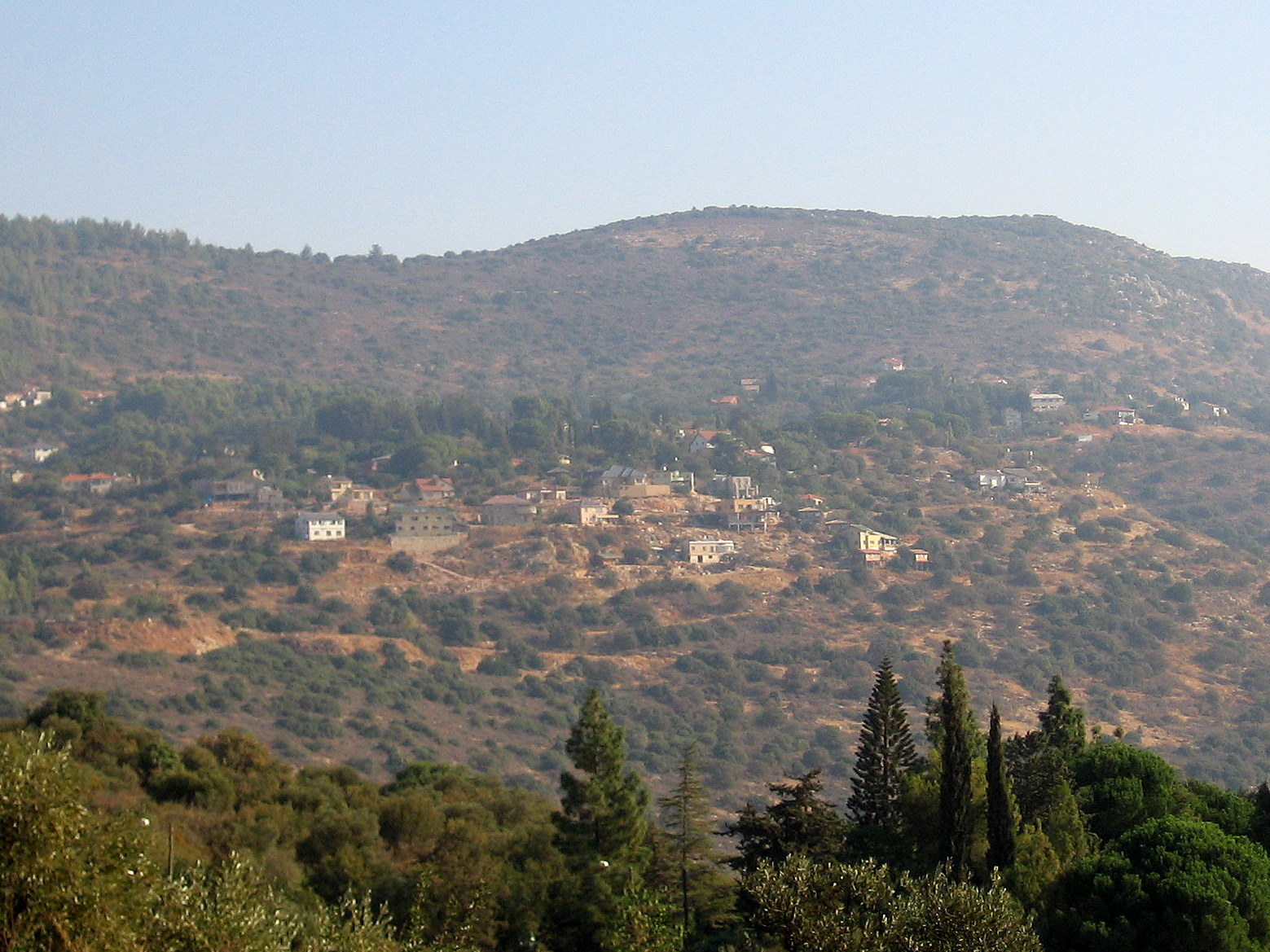
- Moshav Amirim

- Location within Northeast Israel
- Coordinates: 32°56′18″N 35°27′6″E
- Country: Israel
- District: Northern
- Subdistrict: Safed
- Council: Merom HaGalil
- Population (2024): 779

Amirim (Hebrew: אֲמִירִים, lit. Treetops) is a moshav in northern Israel. Located 550 metres above sea level on a hill overlooking the Sea of Galilee, it embraces organic farming and vegetarianism. In 2024 it had a population of 779.

== History ==
Early attempts by Moroccan Jewish immigrants to establish a settlement in the 1950s were not successful. The original name was Shefa Bet. In 1958, a group of people of various backgrounds banded together to create a moshav based on a vegetarian, vegan, and organic lifestyle and ideology. The founders of Amirim were among the pioneers of the vegetarian movement in Israel.

A group of Branch Davidian Seventh Day Adventist families under the leadership of Ben and Lois Roden moved to Amirim in 1958 and established "The Branch Organic Agricultural Association," which encouraged organic agriculture. They had difficulties in cooperating with the requirements of the moshav, however, causing friction with other residents, and the group soon moved to Jerusalem.

== Spiritual Orientation ==
Amirim is mostly a secular Jewish community, but there are some religious Jewish vegetarian families who live there. Its residents have been described as "spiritually oriented."

== Tourism ==
One of the moshav's main sources of income is tourism. The moshav runs guesthouses and restaurants featuring vegetarian and vegan food. In the early 1960s, the Jewish Agency helped 10 families build the first zimmerim, as the guest chalets are known.

The moshav has a sculpture garden which displays 20 statues belonging to the Israel Museum collections. The works are made by Israeli and international artists, including a steel statue by David Palombo.

== Arts ==
The moshav has been noted for its sculpture garden, which features sculptures donated by the Israel Museum, as well as for its music. Regular musical events include Friday evening performances by two of its residents, the couple Miki Shaviv and Mika Karni.

== Notable residents ==
- Mika Karni
- Jonathan Skjöldebrand, Swedish-Israeli basketball player

== See also ==
- Jewish vegetarianism
