= Shefer =

Moshav in northern Israel

Shefer: Hebrew: שֶׁפֶר (Hebrew)
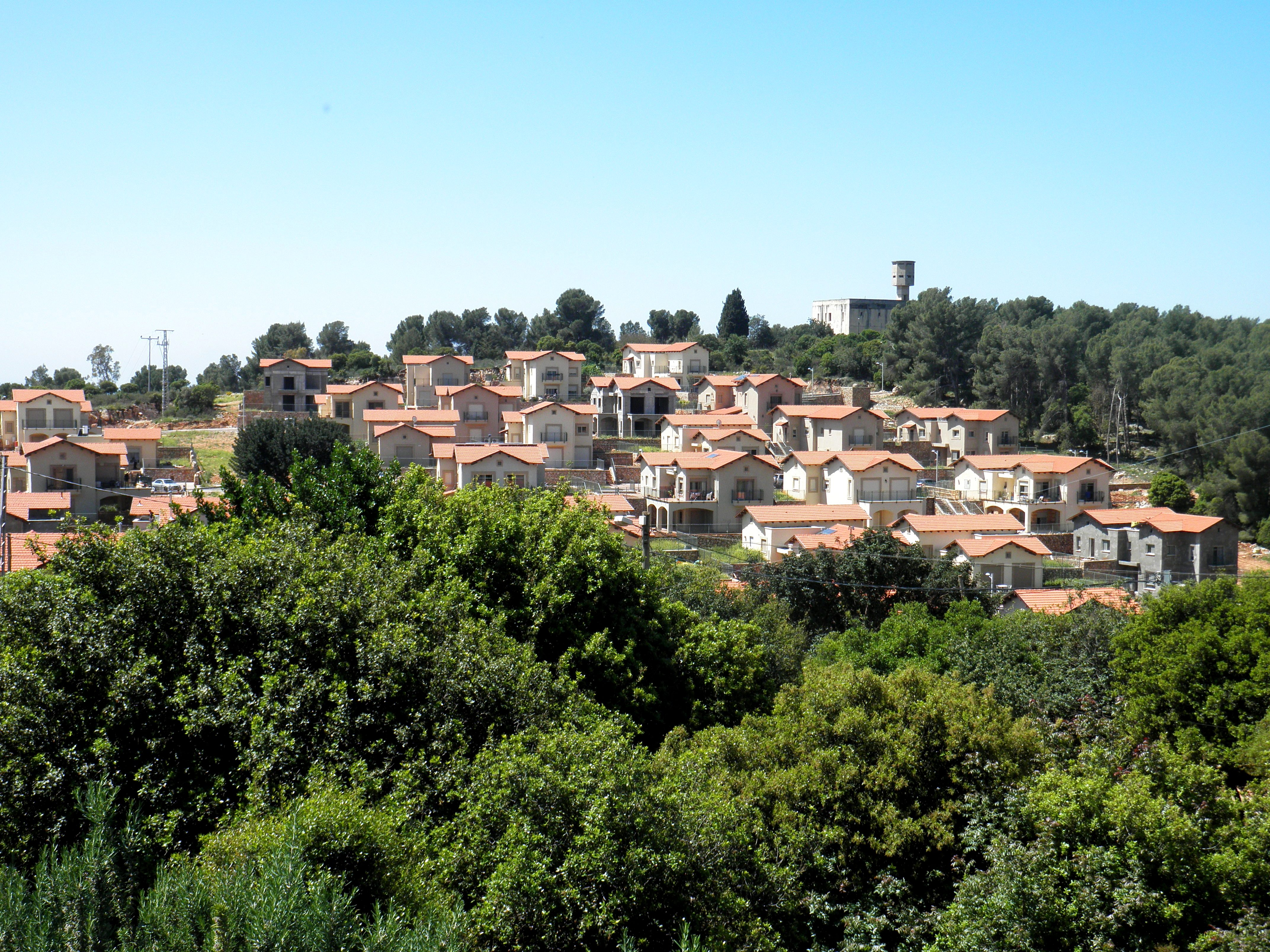

- Location within Northeast Israel
- Coordinates: 32°56′38″N 35°26′10″E
- Country: Israel
- District: Northern
- Subdistrict: Safed
- Council: Merom HaGalil
- Affiliation: Moshavim Movement
- Founded: 1950
- Founder: Yemenite immigrants
- Population (2024): 507

Shefer (Hebrew: שֶׁפֶר, lit. beauty) is a moshav in northern Israel. Located near Safed, it falls under the jurisdiction of Merom HaGalil Regional Council. In 2024 it had a population of 507.

== History ==
The moshav was founded in 1950 as a work village for immigrants to Israel from Yemen, on the lands of the depopulated Palestinian village of Farradiyya. After the founders were expelled from it, a new moshav was founded in the same location by immigrants from North Africa.

The name "Shefer" is borrowed from the blessing Jacob bestowed on Naftali in the Book of Genesis (49:21).

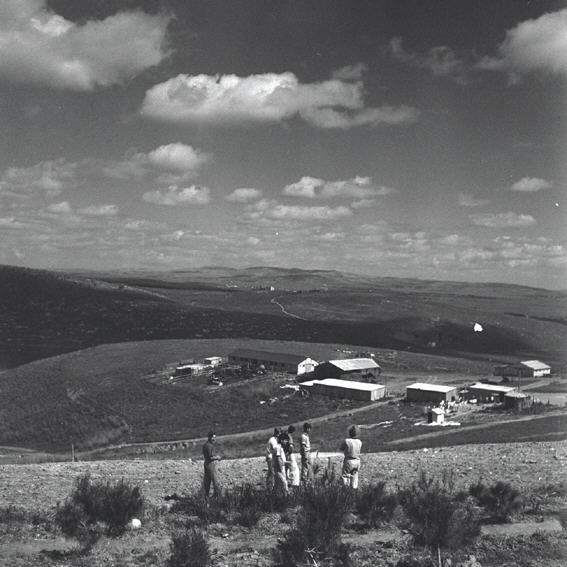
Shefer 1945
