= Mika Karni =

Israeli pop singer

Mika Karni מיקה קרני
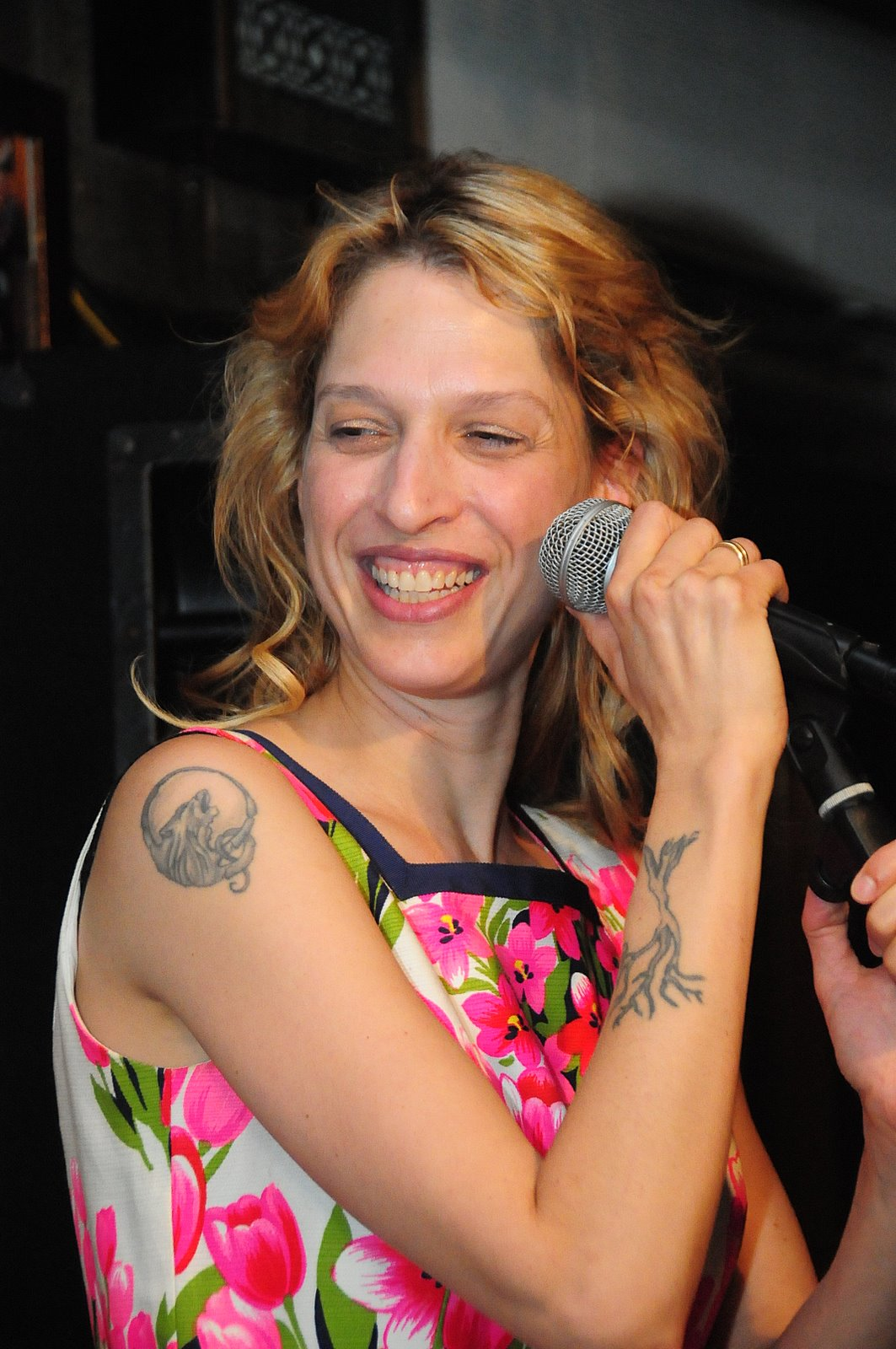
- Mika Karni

Background information
- Genres: Rock, pop, Israeli rock, Israeli music
- Labels: Helicon Records

Mika Karni (Hebrew: מיקה קרני) is an Israeli pop singer and trained violinist.

== Discography ==
- Mika Karni (1997)
- Sipur Amiti ("A True Story") (2000)
- Another World (2001)
- Mi'rega Le'rega ("Minute by Minute" / "Moment by Moment") (2002)
- Lighthouse (2004)
- Simple and Good (2006)

Well-known songs:

- "Migdalor"{"Lighthouse"}
- "Rahamim"{"Mercy"}
- "Nishakti bahura"{"I've kissed a young lady"}
- "Mitchell"
