= Beersheba (disambiguation) =

Beersheba is a city in Israel.

Beersheba or similar may also refer to:

- Beersheba Springs, Tennessee, a town in Grundy County, Tennessee, United States
- Bersabe, ruins of an ancient village in Galilee of Israel
- Berseba, a village in the Karas Region of southern Namibia

== See also ==
- Battle of Beersheba (disambiguation)
