= Beit HaKerem Valley =

Valley in the Galilee region of northern Israel

Coordinates: 32.9287°N 35.3028°E

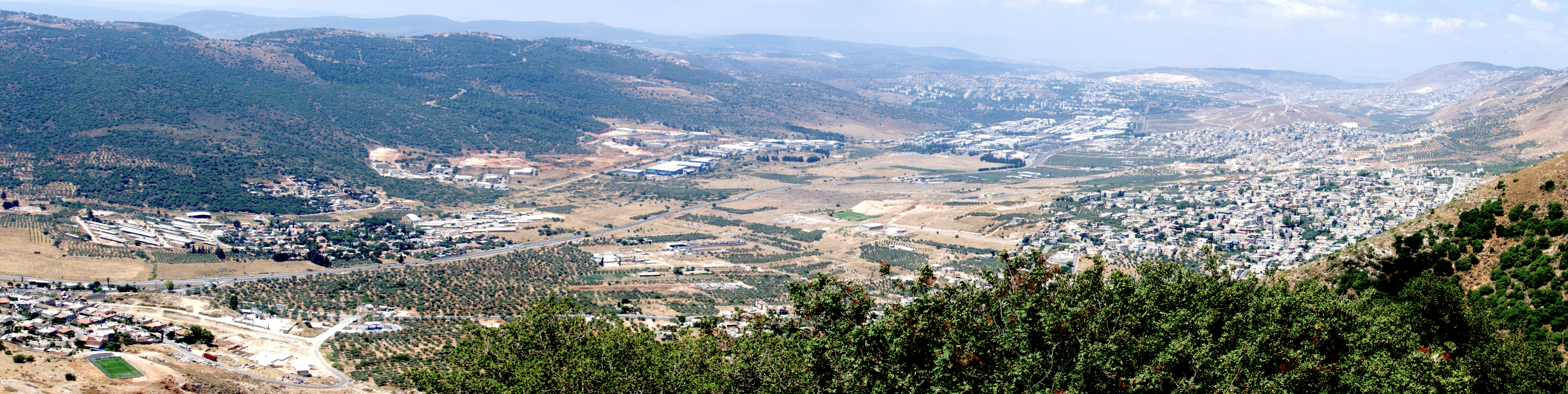
Panorama of the Beit HaKerem Valley

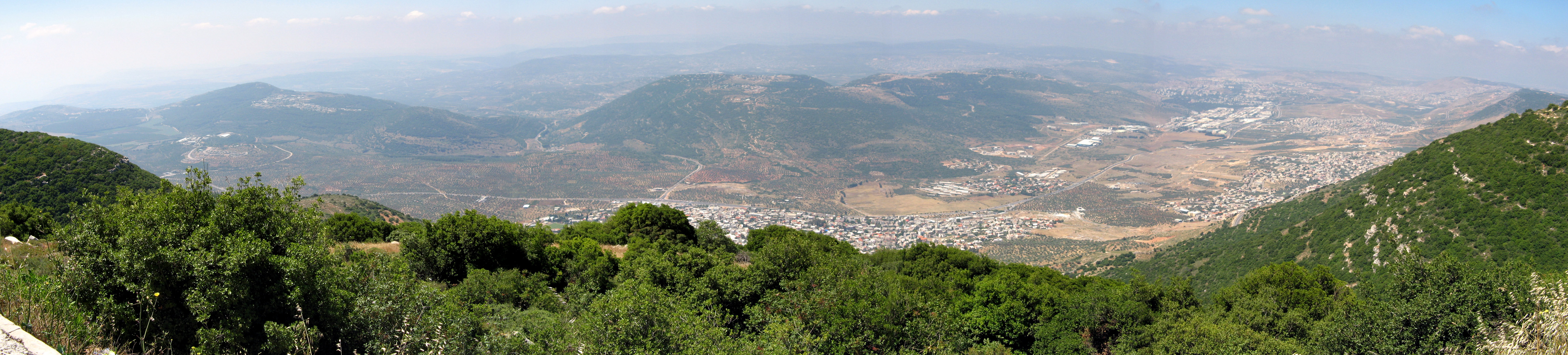
Panorama of the valley

Beit HaKerem Valley (Hebrew: בקעת בית כרם), also known as al-Shaghur (Arabic: الشاغور, romanized: al-Shāghūr), is a valley in the Galilee region in northern Israel.

The valley is the dividing feature between the Upper Galilee featuring relatively high mountains and the Lower Galilee to the south, with lower mountains.

The five Arab local authorities (Bi'ina, Deir al-Asad, Majd al-Krum, Nahf and Rameh) and two Jewish local authorities (Karmiel and Misgav) of the Beit HaKerem Valley have formed a "cluster" of municipalities, connecting municipal leaders to create long-term development strategies, enhance economic development, and attract and receive additional government funding.

== Administrative history ==
Under Mamluk rule, in 1370, the Shaghur was part of an amal (subdistrict) in the province of Safed called 'al-Shaghurayn wa Ma'ilya' and in 1418 as 'al-Shaghur'. The Shaghur was recorded as a subdivision of the Acre subdistrict of Safed Sanjak in the mid-16th century, during Ottoman rule. In 1838, the scholar Edward Robinson noted that al-Shaghur was the district between Acre, Safed and Nazareth and contained the villages of Yaquq, Maghar, al-Mansura, Eilabun, Arraba, Sakhnin Majd al-Krum, Deir al-Asad, Bi'ina, Rameh, Kafr 'Inan, Deir Hanna and Nahf.

== History ==
=== Strategic importance of the valley ===
The valley is the shortest route between the Mediterranean Sea and the Jordan Valley and therefore probably served as an eastern branch of the ancient Via Maris. Due to the difficulties of passage in the west of the valley, due to the Wadi Shagur canyon and the icy ground in winter, there were periods when the road passed north of the valley.

During the Second Temple Days, the route south of the Beit HaKerem Valley was preferred, via Shefa-Amr (Shfar'am), Sepphoris (Tzipori), and from there to the Hananya Valley. This can be seen from the remains of settlements from this period, which are concentrated in the Hananya Valley and not in the Beit HaKerem Valley.

The importance of the valley rose again in the Crusader period, with the rise of Acre and Safed, the latter becoming an important Crusader monastery. A church has been preserved from this period at Deir al-Asad.

From the Mamluk period, until the end of the Ottoman rule, the route through the Beit Hakerem Valley competed with the Acre-Shfar'am-Tzipori-Nazareth route.

The valley became passable all year round in the late 1920s as a result of drainage and cultivation works, and in the 1930s a modern road was paved through it.

=== Settlement in the Valley ===
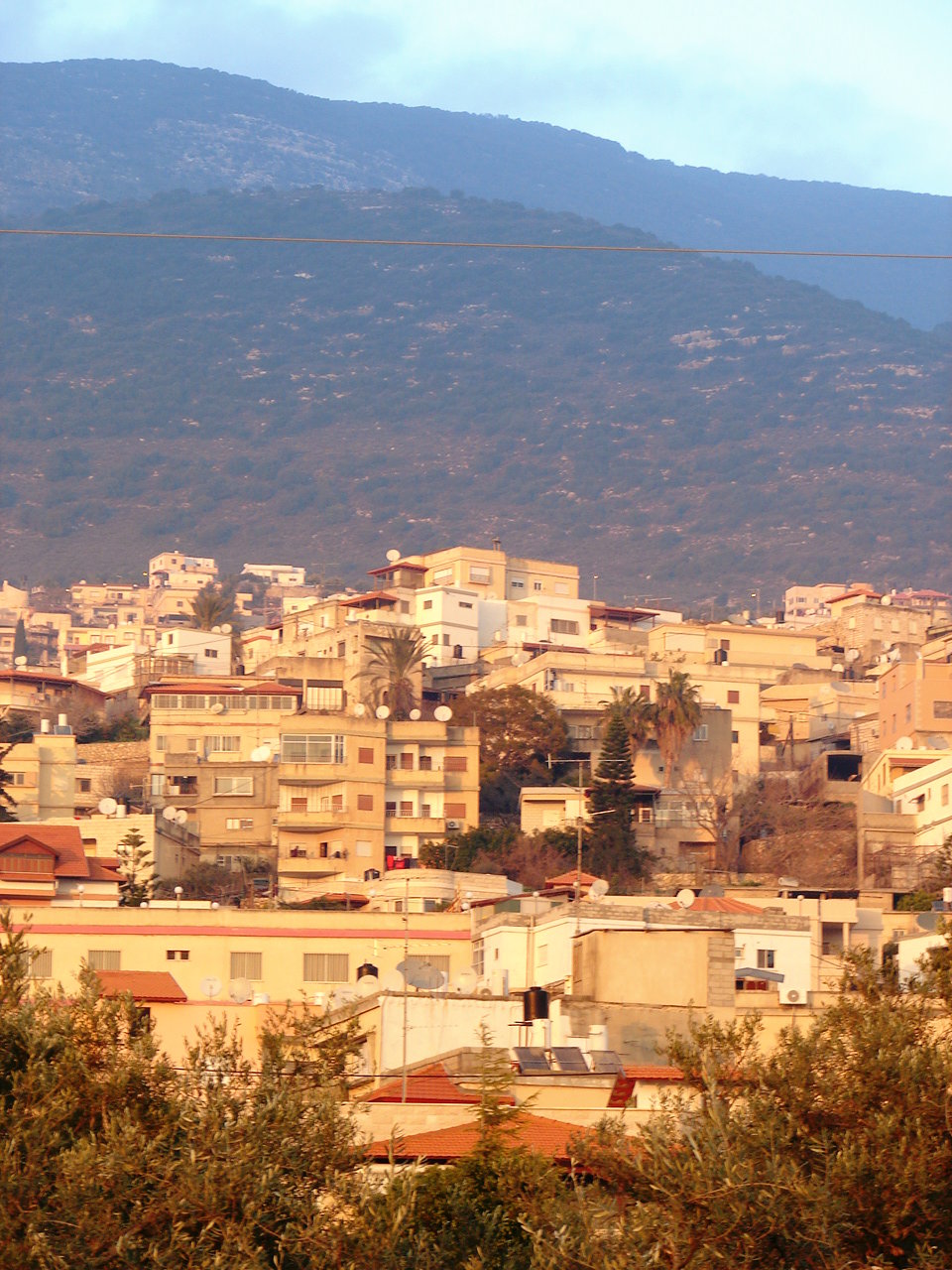
Rama

During the First Temple period, there were several settlements in the Valley, including Rama (Ramat Naftali) and Beit Hakerem. It is not possible to identify the exact location of any settlements from this period, except for Rama, which is identified with Khirbet Jull, near Ramah.

The area contains numerous settlement remains from the Hellenistic period to the Crusader period, concentrated mainly on the edges of the Hananya Valley and in the hills south of the Beit Hakerem Valley. Most of the remains are in the Karmiel area, which indicates the possibility of an industrial center there.

The Christian remains from the Byzantine period in Israel indicate significant settlement in the Valley during this period, including Nahaf, Deir al-Asad, Majd al-Krum, and Rameh. (Note: references in linked wiki pages) It seems that this settlement was severely damaged with the end of Byzantine rule in the country, and the Valley suffered from abandonment. After the expulsion of the last Crusaders from the country by the Muslims in 1291, the settlements in the north of the Valley, such as Majd al-Krum and Deir al-Asad, which were located near the source of the road, were destroyed.

In the 11th century, according to their tradition, Druze settlement began in the Galilee. Other sources claim that the Druze began to settle in the valley in the 13th century. In later periods, two significant waves of settlement occurred, in the 16th century and in the early 18th century. A testimony from the governor of Safed from 1732 states that most of the inhabitants of the valley at that time were Druze. During the reign of Daher al-Umar in the 1740s, the Druze were dispossessed of their villages, and the only Druze settlements remaining in the valley today are Sajur, Ein al-Asad and the village of Rameh, a quarter of whose inhabitants are Druze.

== See also ==
- Geography of Israel

== Bibliography ==
- Rhode, H. (1979). The Administration and Population of the Sancak of Safad in the Sixteenth Century (PhD). Columbia University.
- Robinson, E.; Smith, E. (1841). Biblical Researches in Palestine, Mount Sinai and Arabia Petraea: A Journal of Travels in the year 1838. Vol. 3. Boston: Crocker & Brewster.
