= Kafr 'Inan =

Kafr 'Inan كفر عنان Kefr 'Anan; Kefar Hananiah (old)
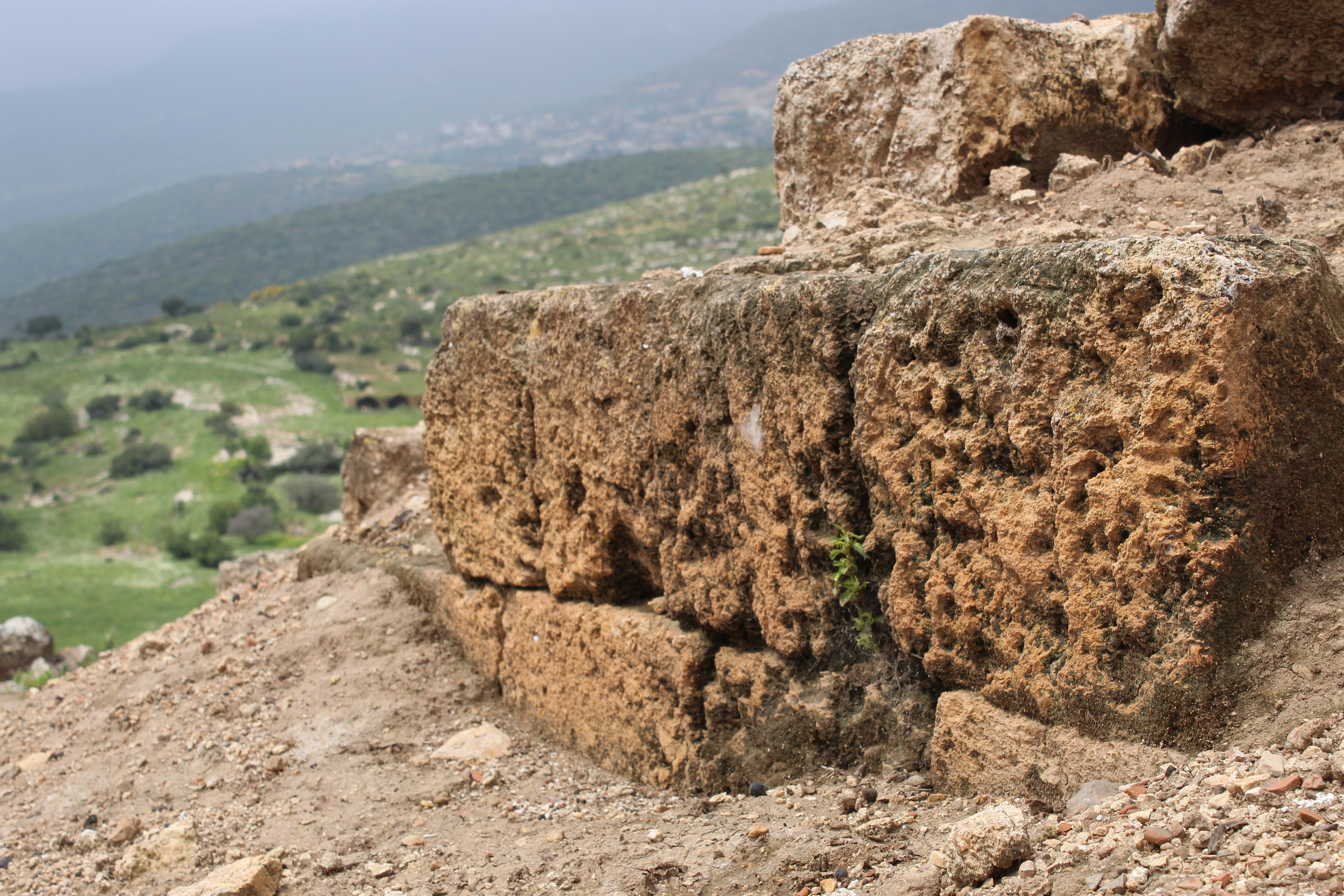
- Ruins of ancient Kfar Hananya
- Etymology: Village of Anan
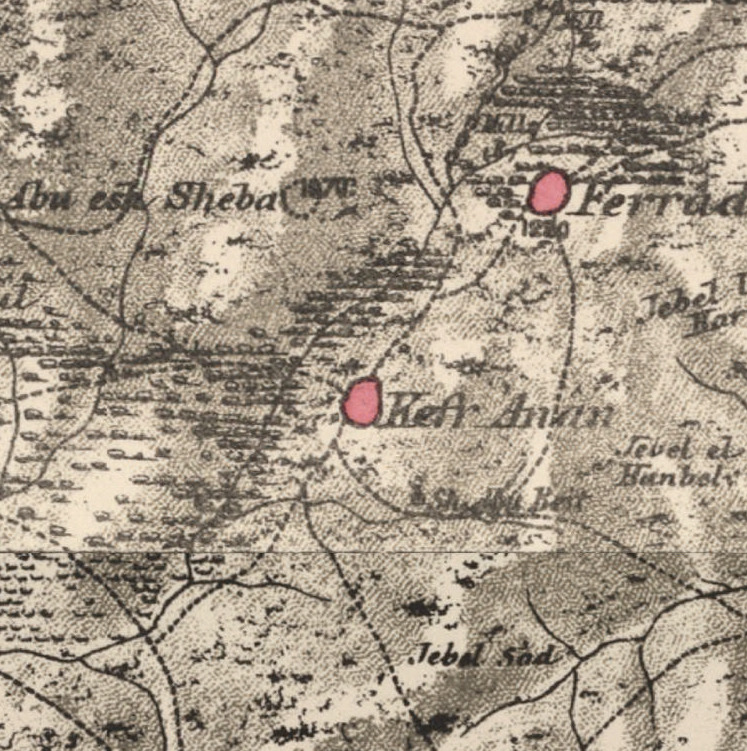
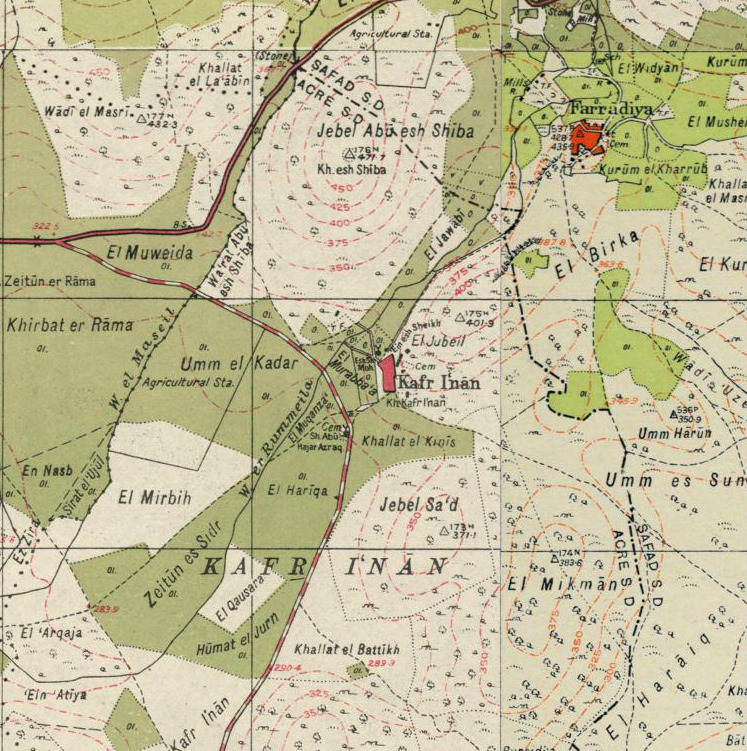
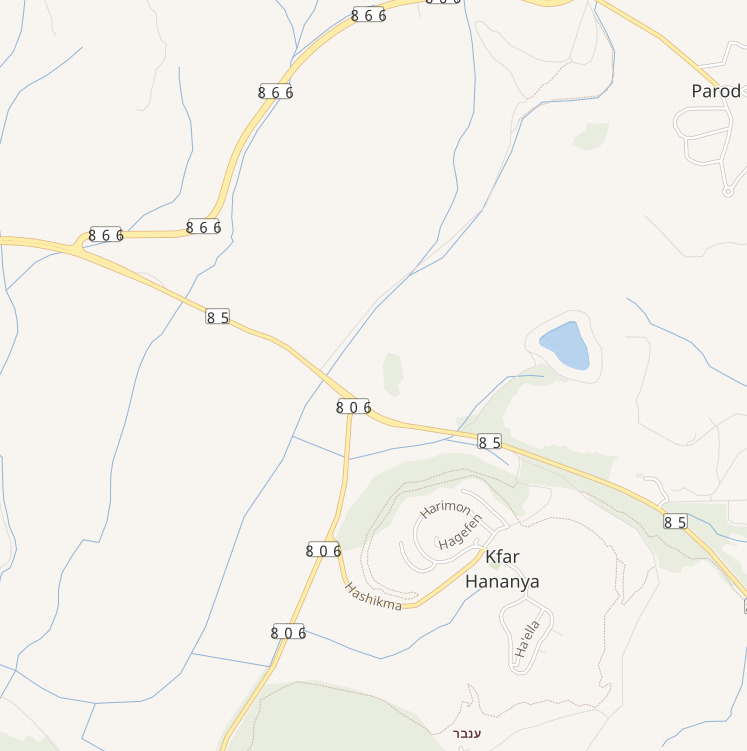
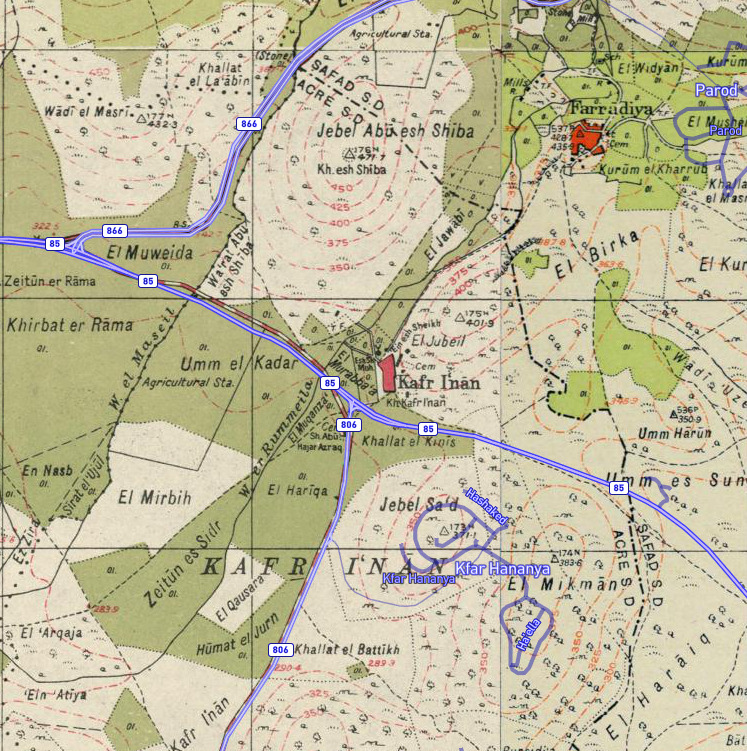
- 1870s map 1940s map modern map 1940s with modern overlay map A series of historical maps of the area around Kafr 'Inan (click the buttons)

- Location within Mandatory Palestine
- Coordinates: 32°55′23″N 35°25′07″E
- Palestine grid: 189/259
- Geopolitical entity: Mandatory Palestine
- Subdistrict: Acre
- Date of depopulation: February 1949 captured on 30 October 1948 during the Golani Brigade (part of Operation Hiram)

Area
  - Total: 5,827 dunams (5.827 km^{2}; 2.250 sq mi)

Population (1945)
  - Total: 360
- Cause(s) of depopulation: Expulsion by Yishuv forces
- Current Localities: Kfar Hananya

Kafr ʿInān (Arabic: كفر عنان), is a former Palestinian village, depopulated in the 1948 Arab–Israeli war. It was located around 33 kilometres (21 mi) east of Acre.

In ancient times, it was known as Kfar Hananiah, and was a large Jewish village and a significant pottery production center. Archaeological surveys indicate Kefar Hanania was founded in the Early Roman period, and was inhabited through the Byzantine period. It was resettled in the Middle Ages and the modern era. By mid 1500, the village was wholly Muslim and was known as Kafr 'Inan.

Kafr ʿInān was captured by the Israel Defense Forces during the 1948 Arab–Israeli war. It was depopulated and destroyed as part of the 1948 Palestinian expulsion, with its residents expelled to the West Bank or to other Arab towns in the newly established Israel. Many villagers managed to "infiltrate" back to Kafr ʿInān, but on three occasions in January and February 1949 the Israeli army expelled them.

A shrine for the Sheikh Abu Hajar Azraq and the remains of a small domed building are still standing, along with the remains of various burial sites of rabbis. In 1989, the Israeli village of Kfar Hananya was established on Kafr ʿInān land on a hill adjacent to the former Palestinian village.

== History ==
=== Roman and Byzantine Kfar Hanania ===
The earliest mentions of the village occur in sources from the Roman and Byzantine periods in Galilee, when it was then a Jewish village known as Kefar Hananya (or Kfar Hanania), that served as a center for pottery production in the Galilee. Most of the cooking ware in the Galilee between the 1st century BCE and the beginning of the 5th century CE was produced here. A Byzantine-period synagogue was partially carved out of the rock, probably during the 5th century CE, and its remains have been excavated east of the village. Khalidi mentions shafts and bases of columns, caves, a pool, and a burial ground discovered in archaeological excavations.

During the Second Temple period, within a distance of less than a kilometer from Kfar Hananya, was the thriving village of Bersabe (now Khirbet es-Saba [Kh. Abu esh-Shebaʿ], Beer Sheba of the Galilee), a village mentioned in the writings of Josephus.

Among the Kfar Hanania's most respected personages who is said to have been buried there was a Tanna (Jewish sage) of the 1st century, Eliezer ben Jacob I. The Talmud and Midrash mention it as the home of Rabbi Jacob of Kfar Ḥanīn, a third-generation amora. As a result of Aramaic influence, the village became known as Kafr Ḥanan, a shortened form of Hananiah.

An Aramaic inscription dated to the 5th or 6th century was found on a kelilah (a polycandelon, i.e. a bronze chandelier holding glass lamps and suspended from the ceiling) in or near the Galilean village of Kefar Makr near Acre, reading "This polycandelon [kelilah] … [offered] to the holy place [the synagogue] of Kefar Hananyah. May they be remembered for good. Amen, selah, shalom". The chandelier, now exhibited in a Belgian museum, bears the inscription next to the images of Judaic religious objects: two menorahs (seven-branched candlesticks), a lulav (palm frond) and a shofar (ram's horn); for illustrations see here.

==== Pottery production ====
Rabbinic literature mentions Kfar Hanania village in relation to the production of pottery; in the Tosefta (Bava Metzia 6:3), there is a reference to, "those who make black clay, such as Kefar Hananya and its neighbors." Late Roman-era pottery types of the kind made in Kafr 'Inan have been found all throughout the Galilee and the Golan.

=== Crusader to Mamluk period ===
Ya'akov ben Netan'el, who visited the village in the 12th century during the period of Crusader rule, writes about the ruins of a synagogue quarried into the hill. Potential references to the village include a mention of the "widow of Ben al-'Anani" in a 12th-century Genizah document and to Kfar Hanan in the 13th century. In 1211, Samuel ben Samson travelled from Tiberias and Kfar Hanania before stopping in Safed. In the 14th century, another traveller transcribes the village's name as Kefar Hanin.

=== Ottoman period: Kafr ʿInan ===
In 1522, Jewish traveler Moses ben Mordecai Bassola found about 30 families of Musta'arabi Jews (Arabic-speaking Jews, as opposed to Sephardi Jews) among the residents, most of whom of priestly stock, making it the fifth largest Jewish community in the country at the time, out of the eight places named by him. An Ottoman census taken two years later (1525) listed 14 Jewish families.

It is during the rule of the Ottoman Empire that the form Kafr ʿInān (Kafr 'Anan) first appears. The village is listed in the tax records of either 1549 or 1596, as forming part of the nahiya (subdistrict) of Jira, part of Safad Sanjak, with 21 households and 8 bachelors; an estimated population of 259. All the villagers were Muslim. They paid taxes on goats, beehives and on its press, which was used either for olives or grapes; a total of 12,272 akçe. All of the revenue went to a Waqf. A map from Napoleon's invasion of 1799 by Pierre Jacotin showed the place, named as "K. Hanein".

It is said some Jewish Kohanitic families migrated to Peki'in, possibly in the late 16th century.

In 1881, the PEF's Survey of Western Palestine described the village as being built of stone and having 150-200 Muslim residents. The arable land in the village comprised gardens and olive trees.

A population list from about 1887 showed that Kafr 'Inan had 80 inhabitants; all Muslim.

=== British Mandate period ===
In the 1922 census of Palestine conducted by the British Mandate authorities, Kufr Enan had a population of 179; all Muslims, increasing in the 1931 census to 264, still all Muslims, in a total of 47 houses.

In the 1945 statistics, Kafr 'Inan had 360 Muslim inhabitants, with a total of 5,827 dunums (1,440 acres) of land according to an official land and population survey. Of this, a total of 1,740 dunums were used for the cultivation of cereals, 1,195 dunums were irrigated or used for orchards and most of these (1,145 dunums) were planted with olive trees, while 21 dunams were built-up (urban) area. The village, however, occupied an area of only 25 dunams (6.1 acres).

The village houses, made of stone with mud mortar, were bunched close together and separated by semi-circular, narrow alleys. Many new houses were constructed during the last years of Mandatory Palestine. Springs and domestic wells supplied drinking water. Olives and grain were the main crops. Grain was grown in the nearby flat zones and valleys.

=== 1948 Palestine war ===
The village was captured on 30 October 1948 by the Golani Brigade as part of Operation Hiram and following the war the area was incorporated into the State of Israel. According to Haaretz, "A few dozen civilians were massacred". Historian Walid Khalidi wrote that the villagers refused to leave like most of the population in the area. Morris reports that the Israeli authorities classified the village as "abandoned" but the villagers kept returning.

In January 1949, the IDF expelled 54, and moved another 128 inhabitants from Kafr 'Inan and Farradiyya to other villages in Israel. On 4 February 1949, units of the 79th Battalion surrounded the two villages and expelled 45 people to the West Bank. The 200 villagers who had permits to stay, mostly old men, women and children, were transferred to Majd al Kurum. Yet again, the villagers returned. By mid-February 1949 there were about 100 back in the two villages, according to IDF sources. The two villages were again evacuated by the IDF.

The expulsion of the villagers upset some members of Mapam, who condemned David Ben-Gurion and the army. However, a suggestion for a Knesset motion calling for the establishment of an inquiry to probe the expulsions of the villagers of Kafr 'Inan, Farradiyya and Al-Ghabisiyya, was apparently never brought to the Knesset plenum.

=== Israel ===
In 1950, Article 125 of the Defence regulation of 1945 was invoked in order to confiscate the land belonging to a number of Palestinian Arab villages in Galilee, among them Kafr 'Inan. This law was also used to prevent the villagers from returning to their homes even by legal means.

The modern Jewish village of Kfar Hananya was first planned to the south of the depopulated Kafr ʿInān village in 1982, and was eventually established there in 1989 on village land (though not on the actual site of Kafr ʿInān). Chazon, built in 1969 on the lands of Al-Mansura, Tiberias, and Parod, built in 1949 on the lands of Al-Farradiyya (District of Safad), are both close to the village site, but not on village land. In 1992, Palestinian historian Walid Khalidi found piles of stones, clusters of cacti, fig trees, the remains of a domed building on a slope facing the village and the small shrine of Shaykh Abu Hajar Azraq on an adjacent hill to the east. The land around the site is forested and planted with fruit trees by the settlement of Parod."

== Archaeology ==
=== Roman to Byzantine-period village ===
In 1933, Joseph Braslavsky was the first to identify the quarried synagogue in Kafr 'Inan, based on the testimony of a local Arab peasant. In 1989, the site was surveyed by Zvi Ilan. Adan-Bayewitz, of the Martin (Szusz) Department of Land of Israel Studies and Archaeology at Bar Ilan University conducted archaeological research at the site from 1987 to 1988, and excavated a late Roman-era pottery kiln in 1992–1993, with a stone-paved approach.

== See also ==
- Depopulated Palestinian locations in Israel
- Palestinian refugee
- Present absentee
- Shikhin, village near Sepphoris, another major pottery production centre in Roman Galilee

== Gallery ==
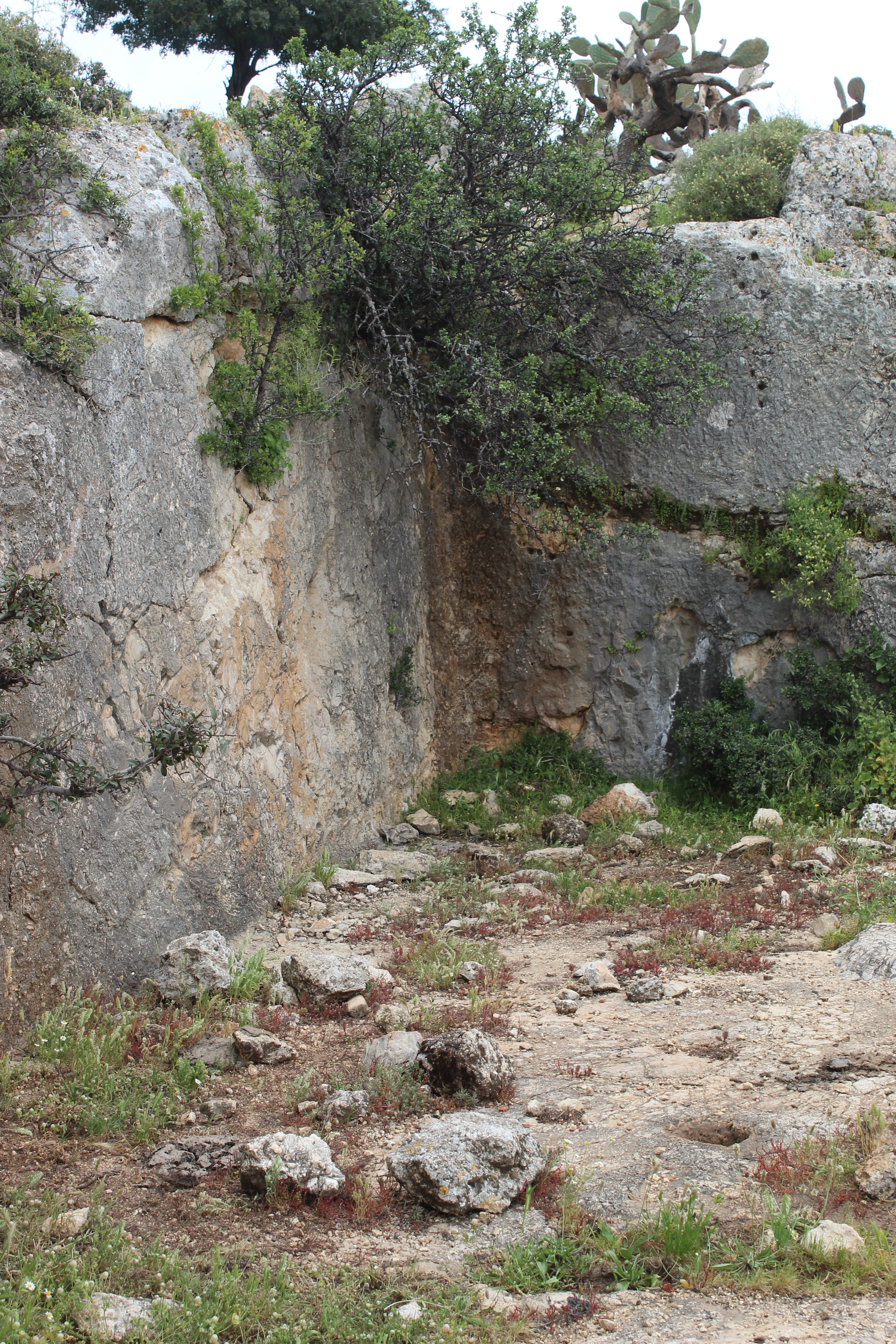
Synagogue carved into the rock at ancient Kefar Hananiah (later Kafr 'Inan)

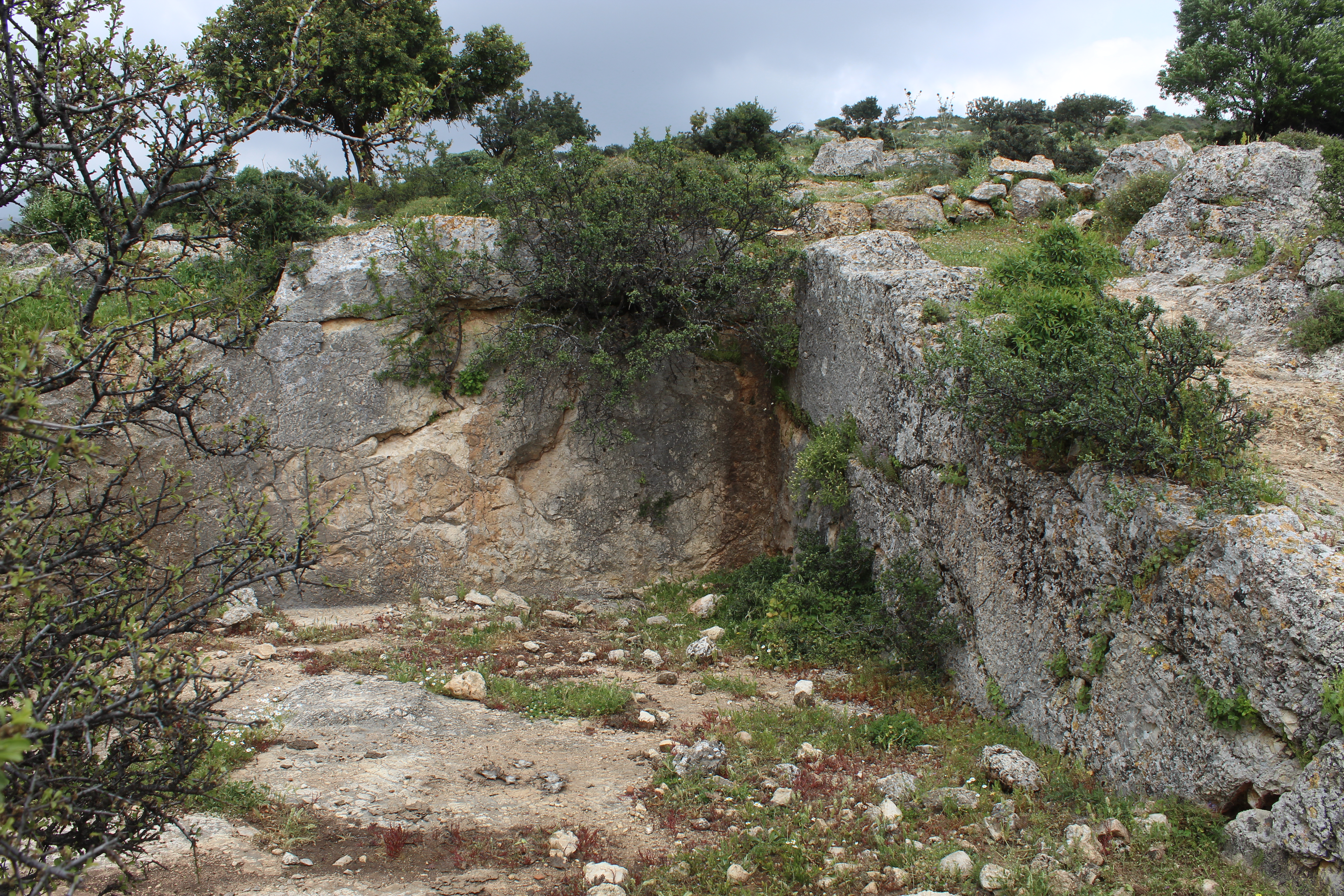
Synagogue walls carved into the rock at ancient Kfar Hananya

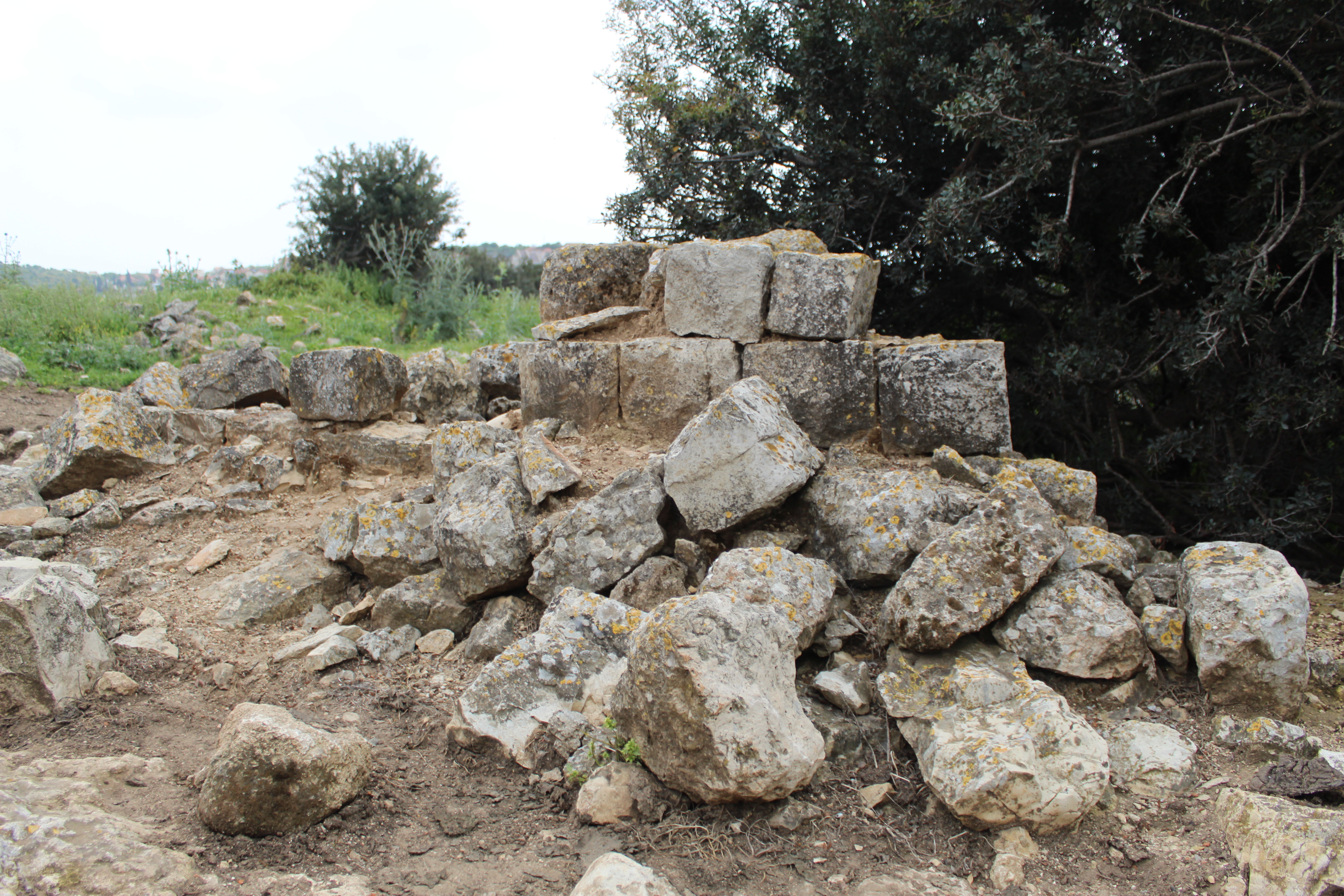
Ruins of stone structure at ancient Kfar Hananya

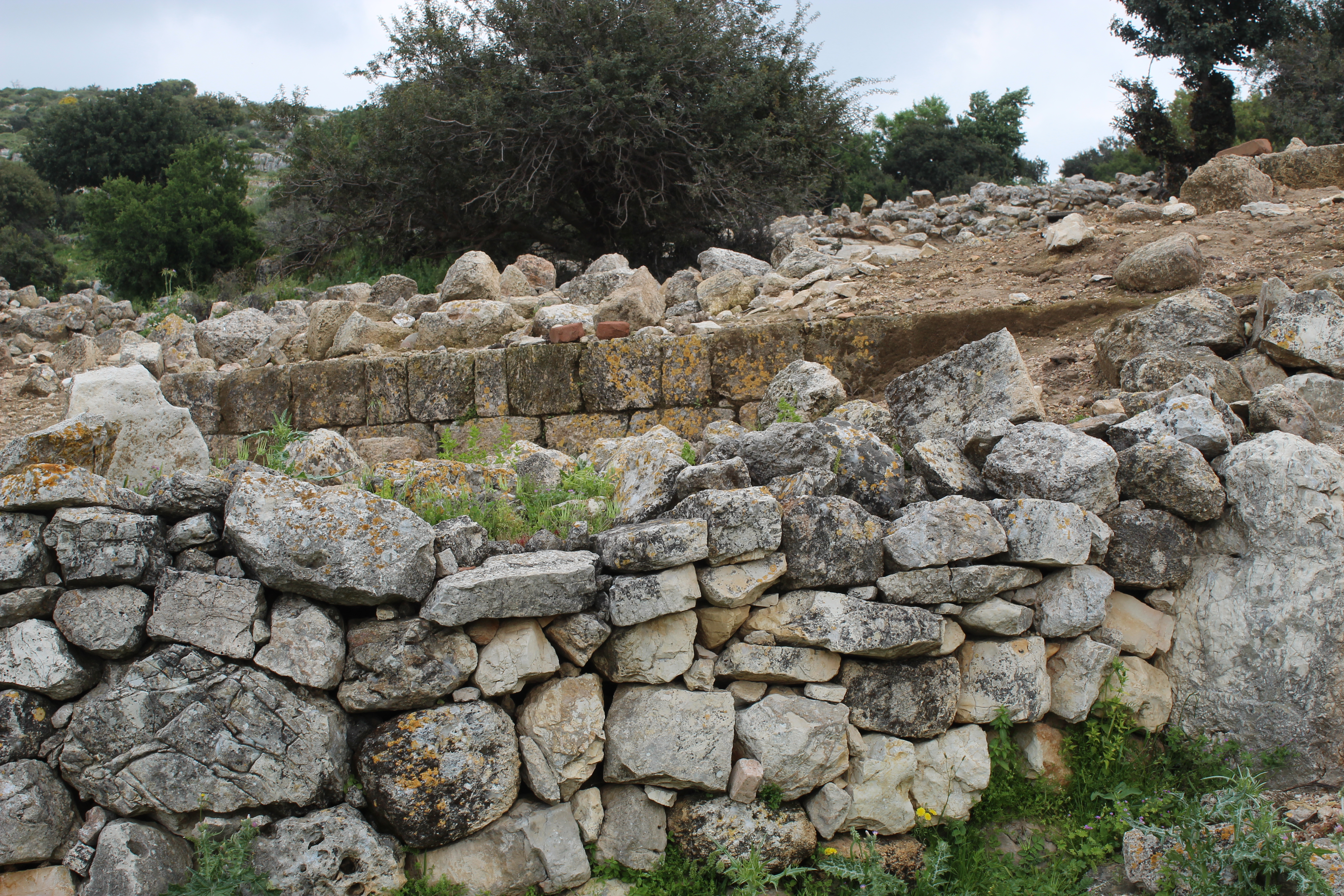
Ancient Kfar Hananya (at Kafr 'Inan)

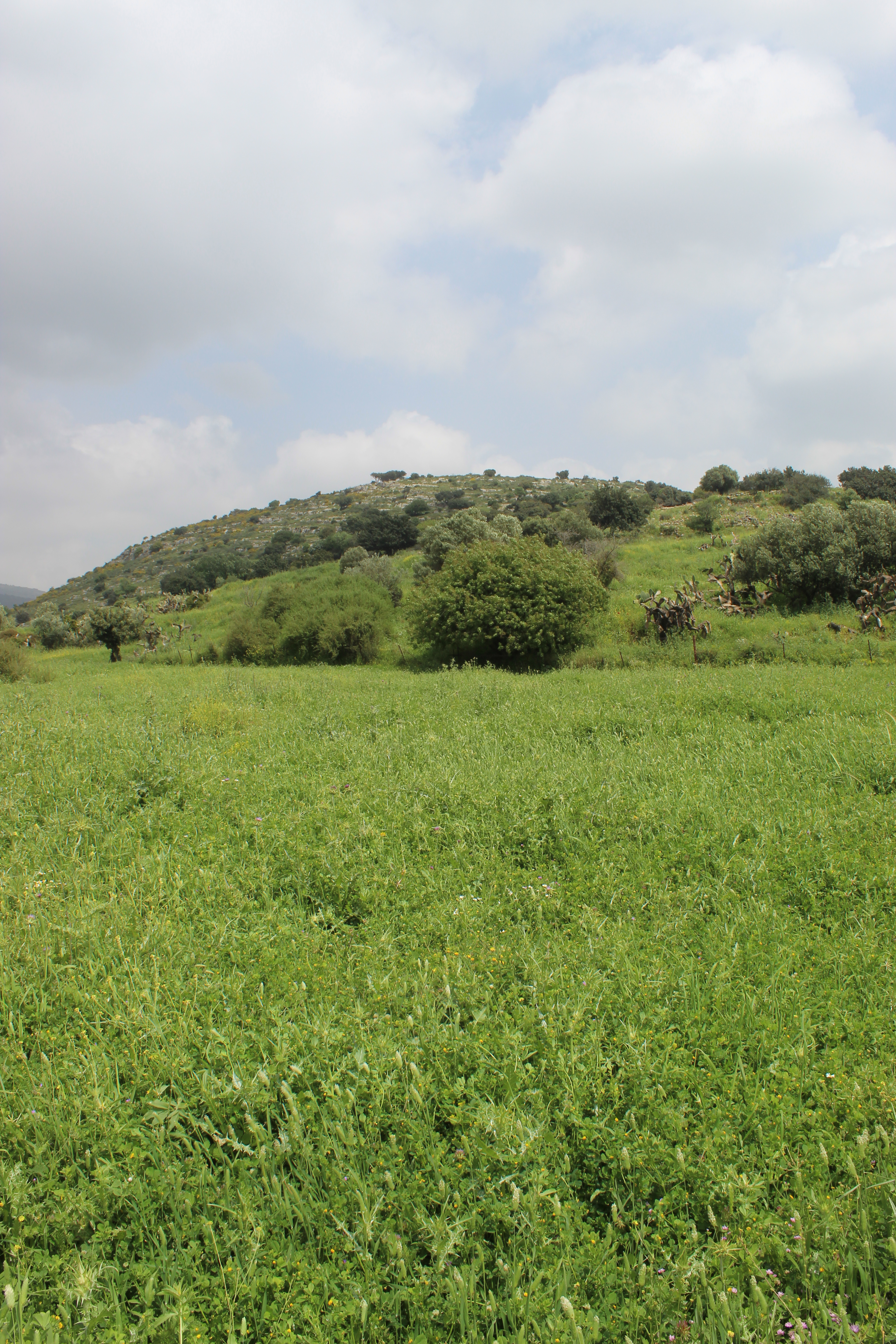
Green fields below hill of Kafr 'Inan

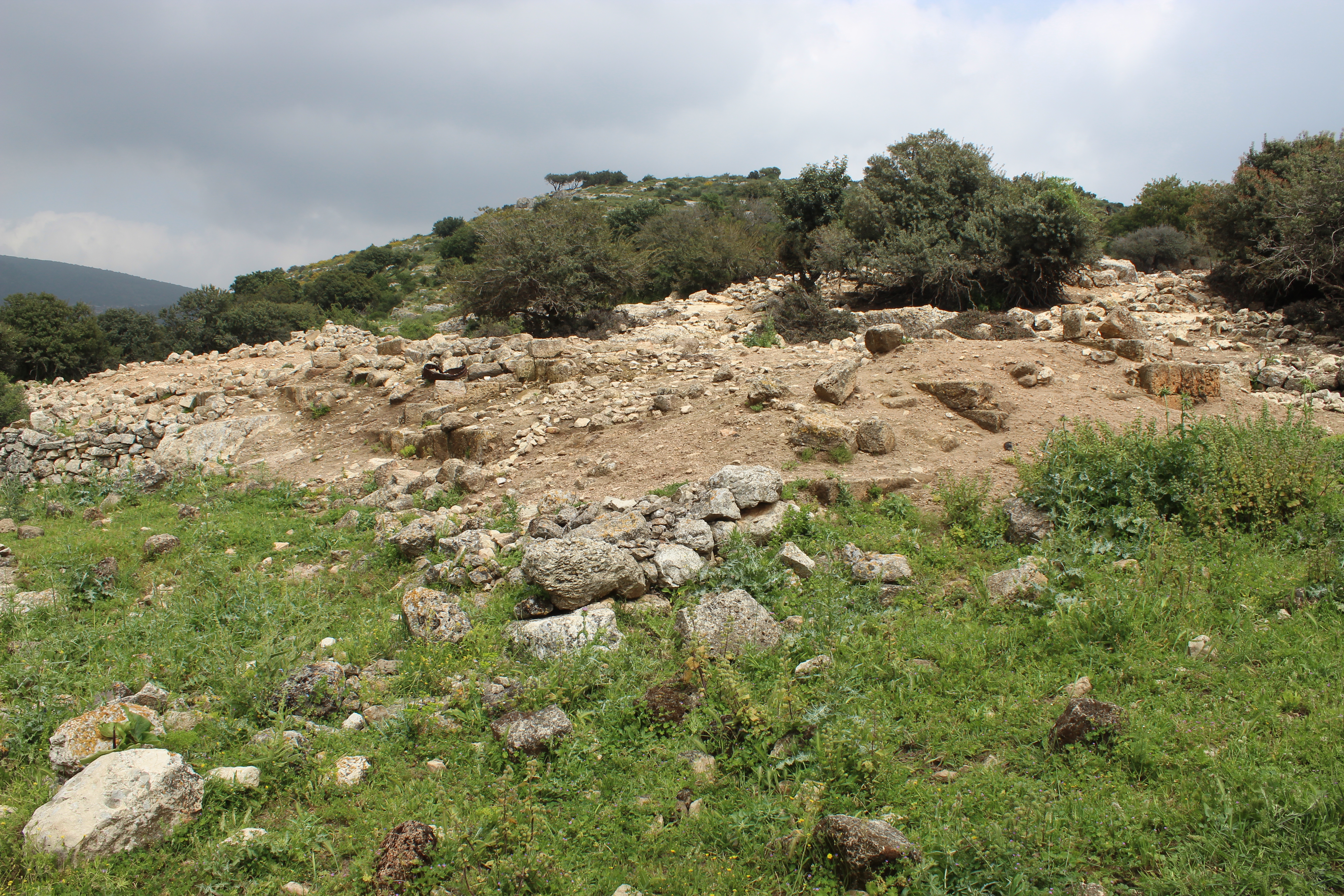
Kafr 'Inan, ruins

== Bibliography ==
- Adan-Bayewitz, David (1992). "Ceramics from Roman Galilee: A Comparison of Several Techniques for Fabric Characterization". Journal of Field Archaeology. 19 (2): 189–205. doi:10.1179/009346992791548941. JSTOR 529978.
- Barron, J.B., ed. (1923). Palestine: Report and General Abstracts of the Census of 1922. Government of Palestine.
- Ben-Zevi, Isaac (1943). "Additional Note on K'far Hanania". Tarbiẕ (in Hebrew). 1 (14). JSTOR 23585059.
- Braslavski, Joseph (1933). "Kefar Hanania / כפר חנניה: על יסוד פרטים שנאספו בשעת סיור". Bulletin of the Jewish Palestine Exploration Society / ידיעות החברה העברית לחקירת ארץ-ישראל ועתיקותיה (in Hebrew). 1 (2): 18–23. ISSN 2312-0096. JSTOR 23718865.
- Braslavsky, Joseph (1933b), "Notes and Clarifications on Historical Topography in the Galilee", Yediot - Bulletin of the Jewish Palestine Exploration Society (ידיעות החברה לחקירת ארץ-ישראל ועתיקותיה), Jerusalem: Jewish Palestine Exploration Society
- Conder, C.R.; Kitchener, H.H. (1881). The Survey of Western Palestine: Memoirs of the Topography, Orography, Hydrography, and Archaeology. Vol. 1. London: Committee of the Palestine Exploration Fund.
- Crossan, J.D. (1999). The birth of Christianity: discovering what happened in the years immediately after the execution of Jesus. Continuum International Publishing Group. ISBN 978-0-567-08668-6.
- Department of Statistics (1945). Village Statistics, April, 1945. Government of Palestine.
- Flood, Finbarr Barry (2001). The Great Mosque of Damascus: studies on the makings of an Umayyad visual culture (Illustrated ed.). BRILL. ISBN 978-90-04-11638-2.
- Frankel, Rafael; Getzov, Nimrod; Aviam, Mordechai; Degani, Avi (2001). "Settlement Dynamics and Regional Diversity in Ancient Upper Galilee (Archaeological Survey of Upper Galilee)". Israel Antiquities Authority. 14.
- Gale, Aaron M. (2005). Redefining ancient borders: the Jewish scribal framework of Matthew's Gospel. Continuum International Publishing Group. ISBN 978-0-567-02521-0.
- Hadawi, S. (1970). Village Statistics of 1945: A Classification of Land and Area ownership in Palestine. Palestine Liberation Organization Research Centre.
- Hütteroth, W.-D.; Abdulfattah, K. (1977). Historical Geography of Palestine, Transjordan and Southern Syria in the Late 16th Century. Erlanger Geographische Arbeiten, Sonderband 5. Erlangen, Germany: Vorstand der Fränkischen Geographischen Gesellschaft. ISBN 978-3-920405-41-4.
- Ilan, Zvi (1991). Ancient synagogues in Israel (Bāttê-keneset qedûmîm be-Ereṣ-Yiśrā'ēl). Ministry of Defence: Tel-Aviv. ISBN 978-9650505226. OCLC 180611930.
- Karmon, Y. (1960). "An Analysis of Jacotin's Map of Palestine" (PDF). Israel Exploration Journal. 10 (3, 4): 155–173, 244–253. Archived from the original (PDF) on 2019-12-22.
- Khalidi, W. (1992). All That Remains: The Palestinian Villages Occupied and Depopulated by Israel in 1948. Washington D.C.: Institute for Palestine Studies. ISBN 978-0-88728-224-9.
- Leibner, Uzi (2009). Settlement & History In Hellenistic, Roman, & Byzantine Galilee (Illustrated ed.). Mohr Siebeck. ISBN 978-3-16-149871-8.
- Lissovsky, Nurit (2007). "History on the Ground on the Evolution of Sacred Places in the Galilee". Zeitschrift des Deutschen Palästina-Vereins. 123 (2). Deutscher verein zur Erforschung Palästinas: 165–184. JSTOR 27931820.
- Mills, E., ed. (1932). Census of Palestine 1931. Population of Villages, Towns and Administrative Areas. Jerusalem: Government of Palestine.
- Morris, B. (2004). The Birth of the Palestinian Refugee Problem Revisited. Cambridge University Press. ISBN 978-0-521-00967-6.
- Moshe Hayyim Baruch, Yaakov (1826). Sefer Shivhei Yerushalayim (in Hebrew). Warsaw. OCLC 777736566. [reprinted from earlier Livorno edition]
- Nazzal, Nafez (1978). The Palestinian Exodus from Galilee 1948. Beirut: The Institute for Palestine Studies. ISBN 9780887281280.
- Negev, Avraham; Gibson, S. (July 2005). Archaeological encyclopedia of the Holy Land. Continuum International Publishing Group. ISBN 978-0-8264-8571-7.
- Palmer, E.H. (1881). The Survey of Western Palestine: Arabic and English Name Lists Collected During the Survey by Lieutenants Conder and Kitchener, R. E. Transliterated and Explained by E.H. Palmer. Committee of the Palestine Exploration Fund.
- Rhode, H. (1979). Administration and Population of the Sancak of Safed in the Sixteenth Century. Columbia University. Archived from the original on 2020-03-01.
- Schumacher, G. (1888). "Population list of the Liwa of Akka". Quarterly Statement - Palestine Exploration Fund. 20: 169–191.
- Winter, Michael; Levanoni, A. (2004). Michael Winter; A. Levanoni (eds.). The Mamluks in Egyptian and Syrian politics and society (Illustrated ed.). BRILL. ISBN 978-90-04-13286-3.
