= Battle of Beersheba =

The Battle of Beersheba may refer to:

- Battle of Beersheba (1917), a part of the Sinai Campaign in World War I
- Battle of Beersheba (1938), between Palestinian rebels and the British Mandate forces
- Battle of Beersheba (1948), a part of Operation Yoav in the 1948 Arab–Israeli War
