= Kfar Hananya =

Settlement in Galilee, Israel

Kfar Hananya: כְּפַר חֲנַנְיָה (Hebrew)
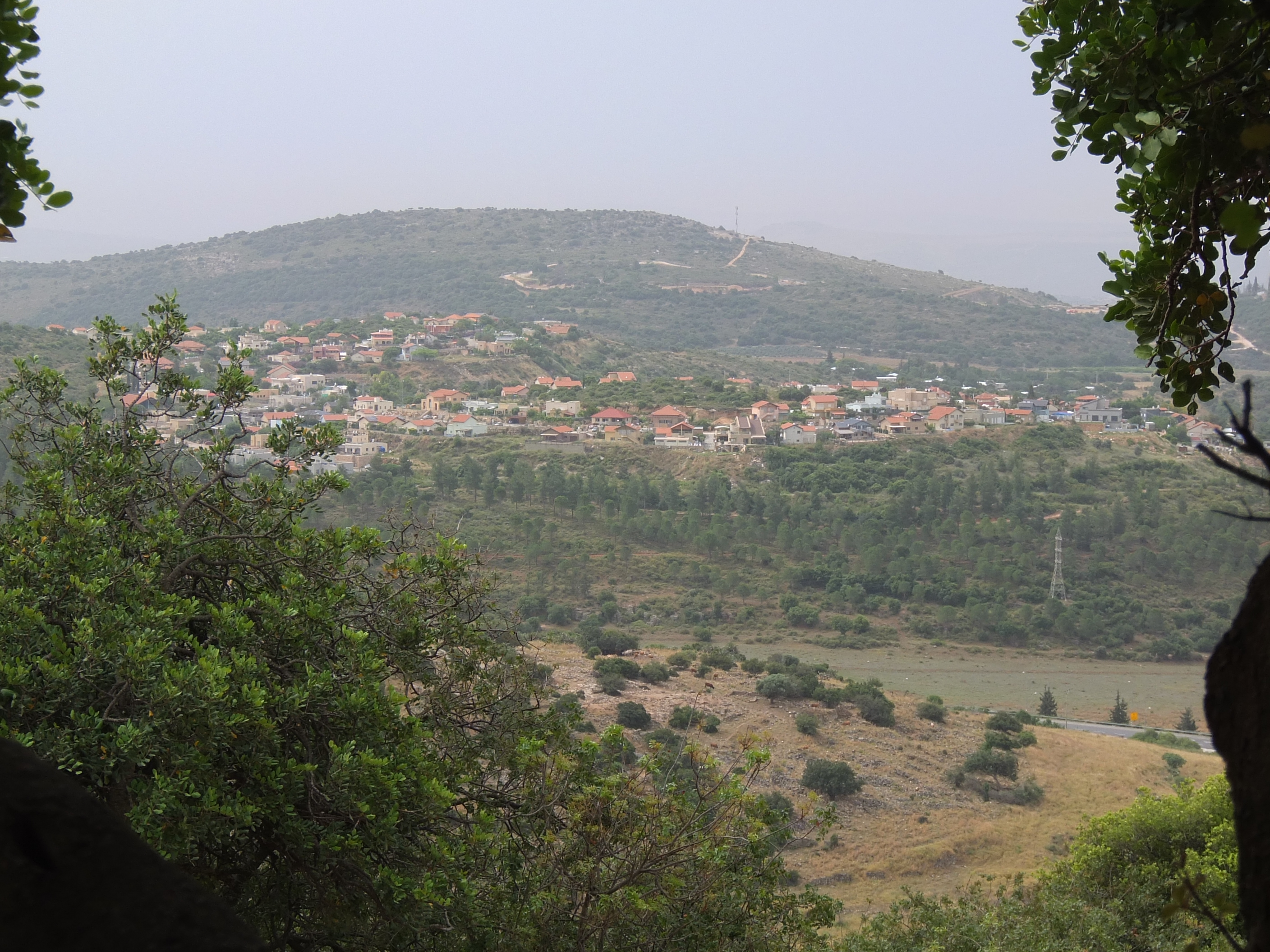
- Etymology: Hananya village
- Location within Northeast Israel Location within Israel
- Coordinates: 32°54′57″N 35°25′21″E
- Country: Israel
- District: Northern
- Subdistrict: Safed
- Council: Merom HaGalil
- Affiliation: Hapoel HaMizrachi
- Founded: 1977
- Founder: Hapoel HaMizrachi
- Population (2024): 776

Kfar Hananya (Hebrew: כְּפַר חֲנַנְיָה) is a community settlement in the Galilee in northern Israel under the administration of the Merom HaGalil Regional Council. In 2024 it had a population of 776.The village marks the border between the historic Upper and Lower Galilee regions. Lower Galilee is defined in the Mishnah (Shevi'it 9:2) as the area south of Kfar Hananya where the Sycamore Fig tree grows (Ficus sycomorus).

== Name ==
The village is named after the ancient village of the same name, a little further to its north, which is mentioned in the Mishnah.

== History ==
=== Antiquity ===
Ancient Kfar Hananya was a Jewish village during the period of Roman and Byzantine rule in the Galilee. It was a center of pottery production in the Galilee and most of the cooking ware in the Galilee between the 1st century BCE and the beginning of the 5th century CE was produced there. It is mentioned for its pottery production in Rabbinic literature. Archaeological excavations revealed shafts and bases of columns, caves, a pool, and a burial ground.

The village was mentioned in various accounts throughout the following centuries. A 12th century Jewish visitor wrote of the ruins of a synagogue quarried into the hill. In 1522, the Jewish traveller Moses ben Mordecai Bassola found about 30 families of Musta'arabi Jews living there, most of them of priestly stock, making it the fifth-largest Jewish community in the country at the time, out of eight places named by him. A 1525 Ottoman census recorded 14 Jewish families in the village.

=== Ottoman era ===
After the Ottoman Empire conquered Palestine, the village came to be known as Kafr 'Inan and very soon became an all-Muslim village. In Ottoman tax records from either 1549 or 1596 it was described as a village with an entirely Muslim population estimated at 259. In 1881, the PEF Survey of Palestine described it as a Muslim village of 150-200 residents.

=== British Mandate ===
During the British Mandate era, Kafr 'Inan was recorded as having an all-Muslim population of 360 in the 1945 Village Statistics. During the 1948 Arab-Israeli War, Kafr 'Inan was captured by the Golani Brigade of the Israel Defense Forces as part of Operation Hiram and the area was subsequently incorporated into the State of Israel. The villagers were expelled.

=== State of Israel ===
Modern Kfar Hananya was founded in 1977 as a moshav of the movement Hapoel HaMizrachi for members of nearby moshavim on land that belonged to Kafr 'Inan, about 1 km south of the village site. In 1992 it became a community settlement. A new neighborhood built in the 2000s is called "Maale Hen" (מעלה חן).

== Landmarks ==
Near the community is a burial place attributed to Rabbi Hananya ben Akashya, a sage of the Tannaim period.

The ruins of ancient Kefar Hanania are situated about one kilometre north of the modern village. Kefar Hanania is mentioned in the Mishnah as a community on the border between the Lower Galilee and Upper Galilee (Mishnah Shevi'it 9:2).

== Archaeology ==
Kfar Ḥananya ware, produced in Kfar Hananya from the mid-first century BCE to the mid-fifth century CE, is the ceramic marker of Roman Galilee. Kfar Ḥananya potters manufactured vessels for cooking and household use in seven general forms: shallow pans, bowls, casseroles, cooking pots, jugs and small storage jars. In the Babylonian Talmud, Rabbi Jose ben Halafta praises the vessels produced in Kfar Hananya, describing them as “not likely to burst.”
