= Bersabe =

Roman-era ruin between Upper and Lower Galilee

- באר שבע (Hebrew)
- Beer Sheba of the Galilee; Khirbet Beersheba
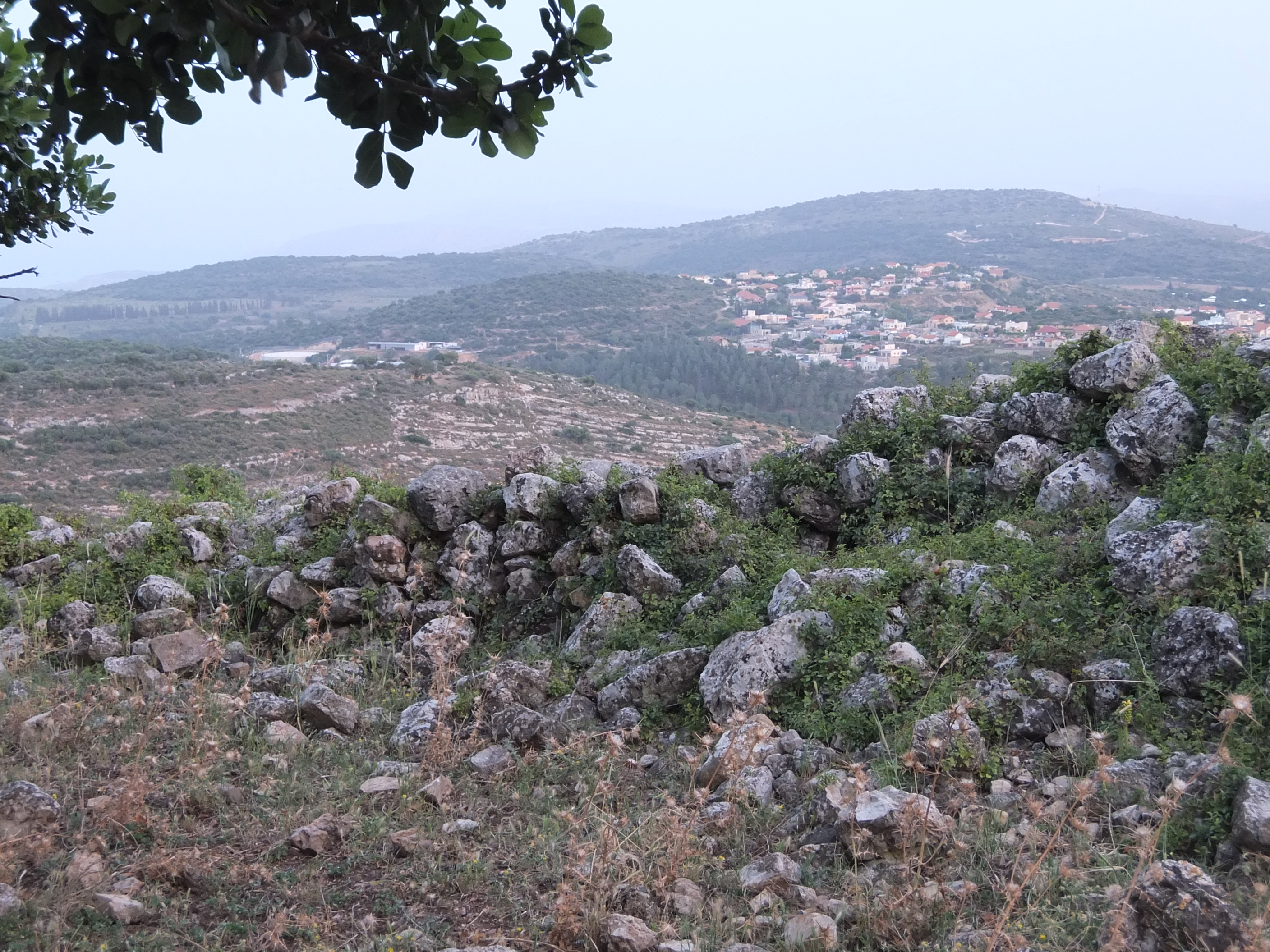
- View from atop of Bersabe (Khirbet Abu esh-Sheba)

- Location within Israel
- 32°55′23″N 35°25′07″E
- Periods: Iron Age, Persian, Hellenistic, Roman, Byzantine, Arab
- Cultures: Jewish, Greco-Roman
- Location: Galilee
- Region: between Upper and Lower Galilee

Site notes
- Excavation dates: 1976, 1985, 2000, 2004
- Archaeologists: Mordechai Aviam, Oren Tal – Y. Tepper – Alexander Fantalkin, Uzi Leibner
- Condition: Ruin

Bersabe (Hebrew: בְּאֵר שֶׁבַע, romanized: Bəʾēr Ševaʿ; Ancient Greek: Βηρσαβέ, romanized: Bērsabé, or Βηρσουβαί, Bērsoubaí), also known as Beersheba of Galilee, was a Second Temple period Jewish village located near the town of Kefar Hananya which marked the boundary between the Upper Galilee and the Lower Galilee, as described by Josephus, with Upper Galilee stretching from Bersabe in the Beit HaKerem Valley to Baca (Peki'in) in the north. Bersabe was one of several towns and villages of Galilee fortified by Josephus during the First Jewish–Roman War, being one of the most defensible positions and where insurgents from across Galilee had taken up refuge against the Imperial Roman army when the surrounding countryside was plundered.

The ancient village has been identified with the present site of Khirbet es-Saba, a hilltop ruin within a distance of less than a kilometer of the village Kafr 'Inan (Kefr ʿAnan), at the eastern fringe of the Beit HaKerem Valley, and rising some 472 metres (1,549 ft) above sea-level. The same site has been rendered by other authors under the name Khirbet Abu esh-Shebaʿ, a little northwest of Kefr ʿAnan and closely adjoining Farradiyya/Parod to their southwest. The site lies 5 kilometres (3.1 mi) eastward of the Arab town of er-Rameh, along Route 85, and about 8 kilometres (5.0 mi) southwest of Safed.

In 1873, Kitchener and Conder, on a surveying mission with the Palestine Exploration Fund, visited the site and mentioned it as being "a large ruin, which stands upon the terraced hill top." A survey later conducted at the site reveal that the village had occupied an area of about 70 dunams (17.3 acres).

From a prospect on Mount Kefir in the Mount Meron range, as one looks out over the hilltop ruin of Bersabe, the square layout or lines where once stood the walls of the town can still be distinguished. The line of the ancient wall extended over an area comprising the upper third of the hill. The thickness of the northernmost wall, where the hill was easily accessible, is measured at 2.8 metres (9.2 ft), and was built with three semi-circular watch towers. The easternmost wall was built in a zig-zag configuration. The walls were constructed of fieldstones.

== Fate of town's defenders ==
From one end of Galilee to the other there was an orgy of fire and bloodshed; no horror, no calamity was spared; the only safety for the fugitive inhabitants was in the towns which Josephus had fortified....

— Josephus, The Jewish War 3.59 (3.4.1)

There are no surviving written records on the fate of the town's defenders, although Josephus alludes to it in his Life's Autobiography (§ 65) where he writes: “...I was in the power of the Romans before Jerusalem was besieged, and before the same time, Jotapata was taken by force, as well as many other fortresses, and a great many of the Galileans fell in the war.” Elsewhere, Josephus writes (The Jewish War 4.7) that after the fall of Tarichaea, all but two of the rebel fortresses and strongholds surrendered to the Roman army. This would have happened in the second year of the war, in the 13th year of Nero's reign, sometime between the capture of Jotapata (in the lunar month of Tammuz) and the capture of Tarichaea (in the month of Elul that same year), and which effectually brought an end to the war in Galilee.

The usual Roman procedure in cases involving open rebellion was to kill the able-bodied men who rose up in rebellion, but to sell into slavery all captive women and children.

== Archaeological finds ==
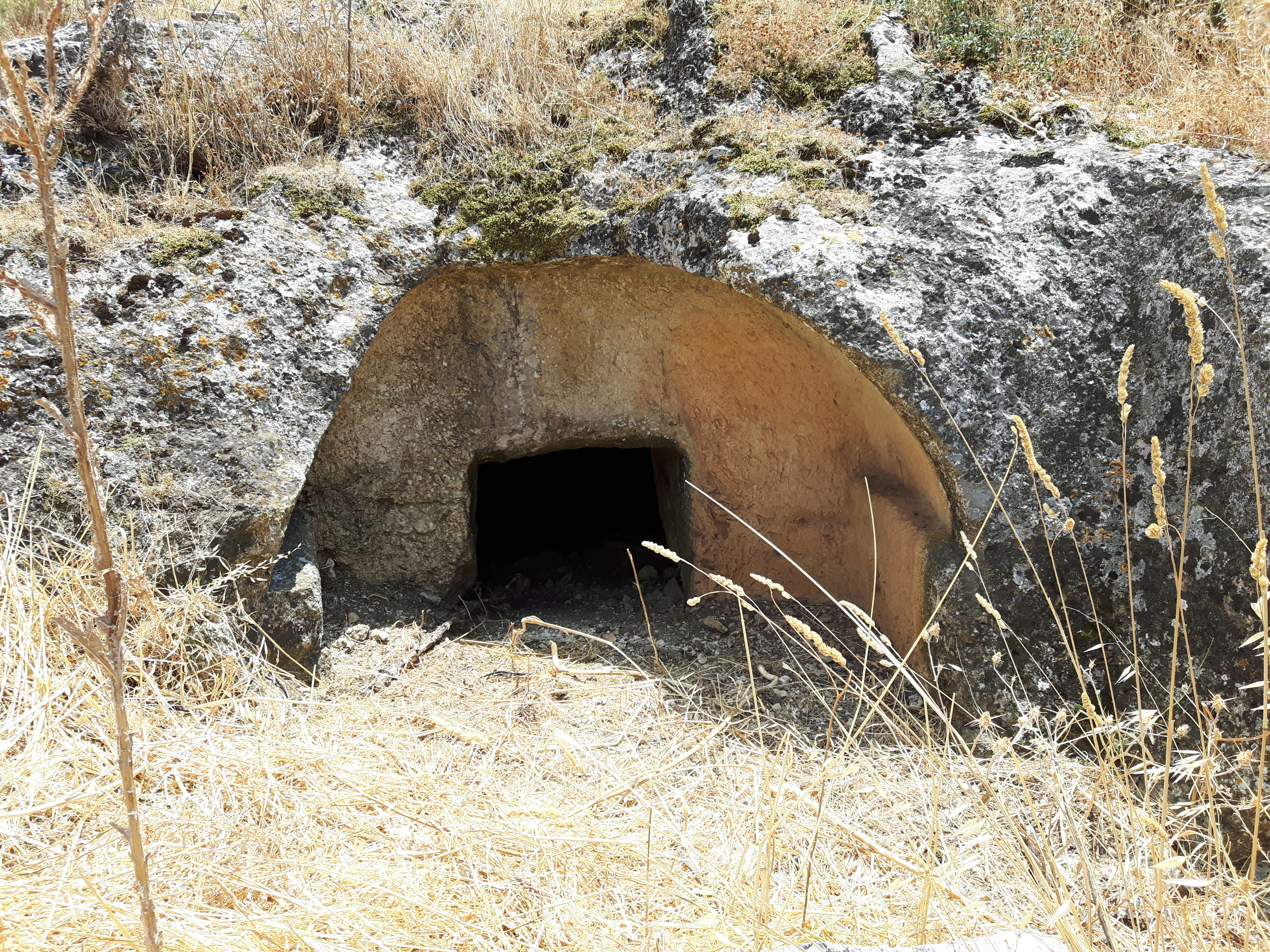
Jewish tomb below the village ruins

Potsherds from the Iron Age, Persian, Hellenistic, Roman, Byzantine and Arab periods have been found on the site. Only one square near the ancient wall has been excavated. Mordechai Aviam who excavated the site has noted that the ancient ruin has yielded large quantities of "Galilean Coarse Ware" (GCW) and other Hellenistic and Early Roman shards and coins. Coins found at the site date from the fourth century BCE to the second century CE. Unidentified razed structures and rock-cut cisterns are scattered across the hilltop. The site also abounds with karstic caves.

Another discovery consists of a fragmented bronze base along with the preserved foot of a statuette depicting the Egyptian bull deity Apis. The base features a trilingual inscription in Hebrew/Aramaic, Hieroglyphic, and Greek.

Pottery found at the site proves the continuation of the settlement deep into the 3rd century CE.

== Gallery ==
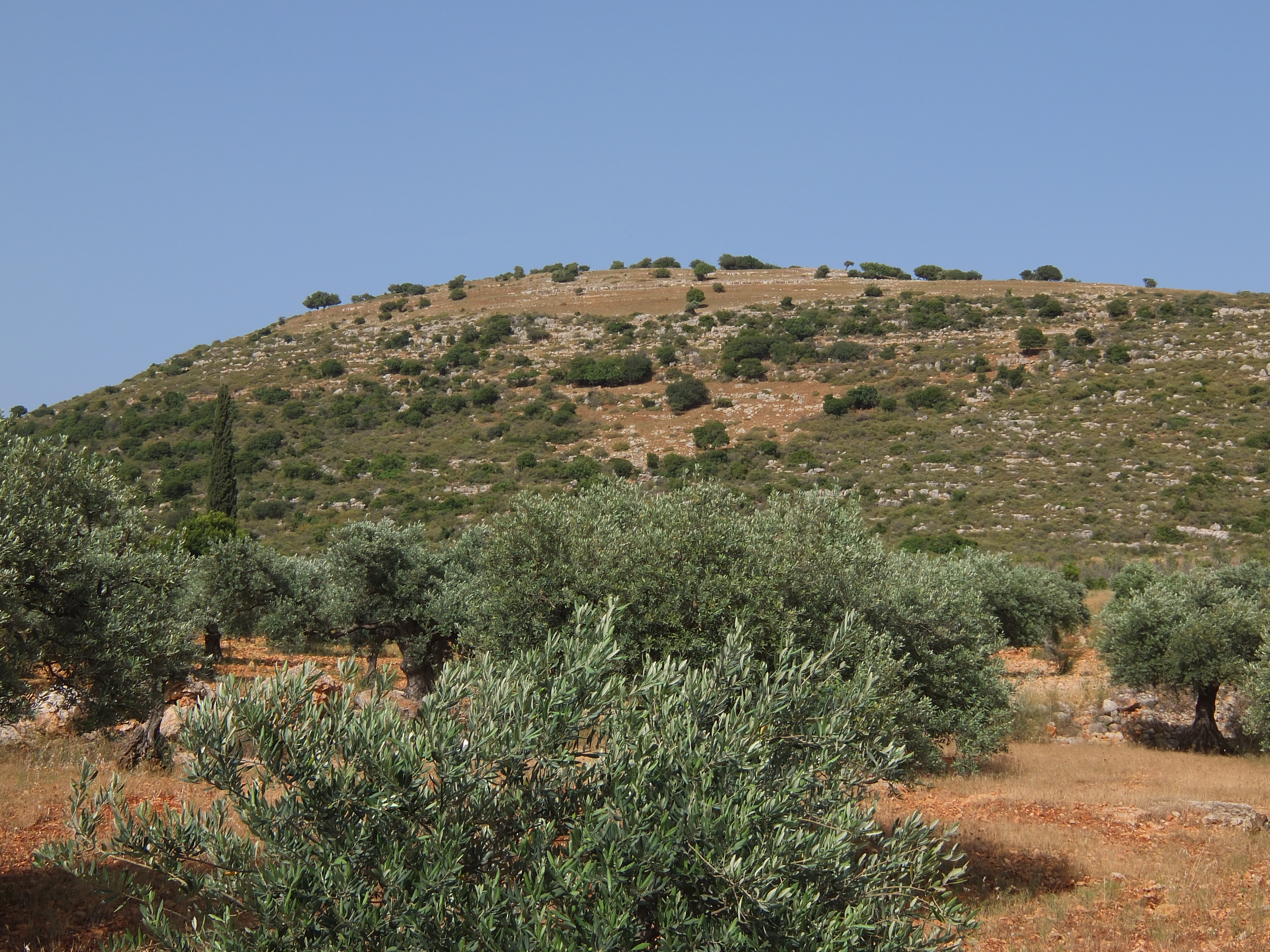
The hill of Bersabe (Kh. Abu esh-Sheba) from western side

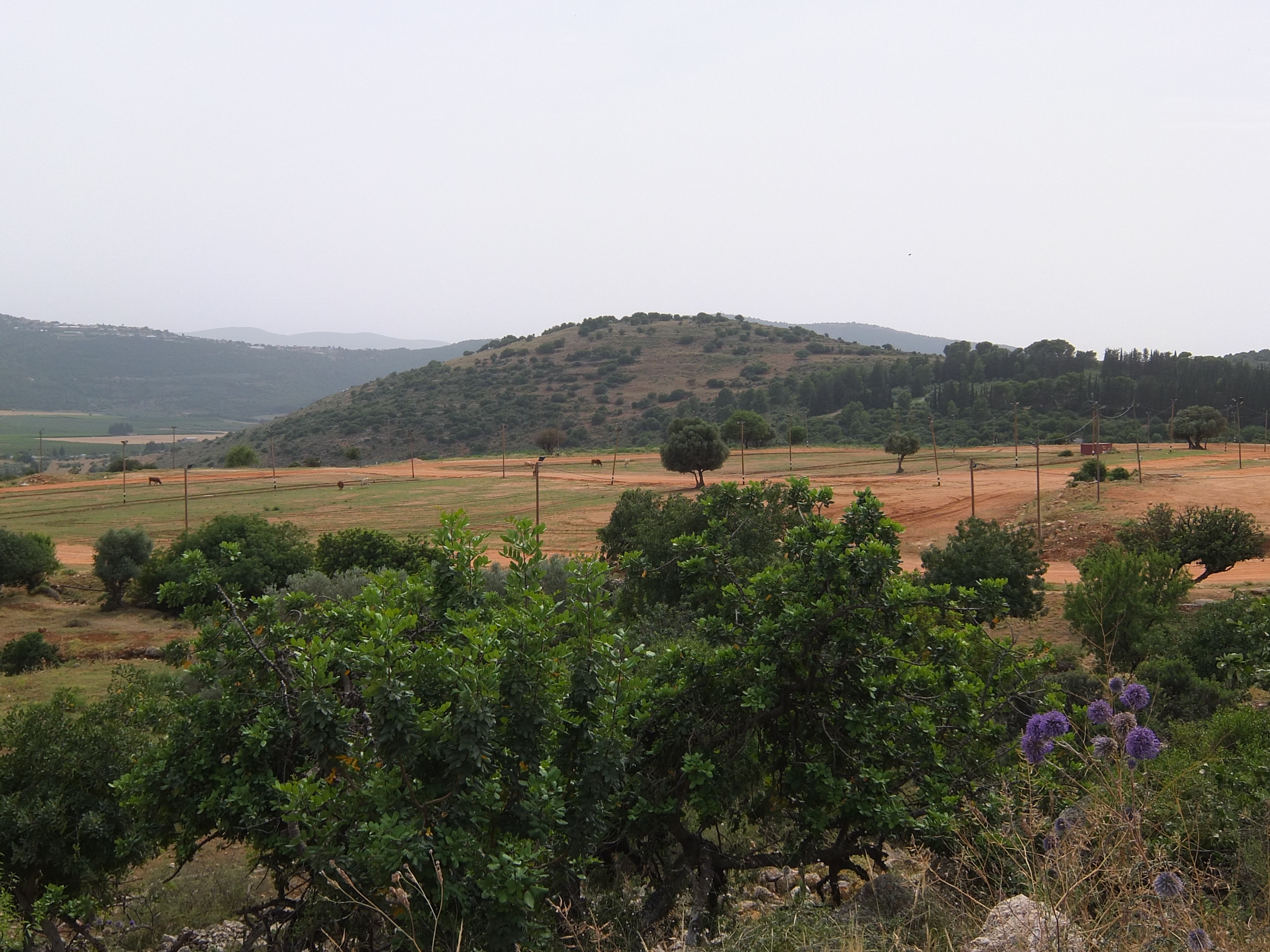
Khirbet Abu esh-Sheba (Bersabe) seen from northern side

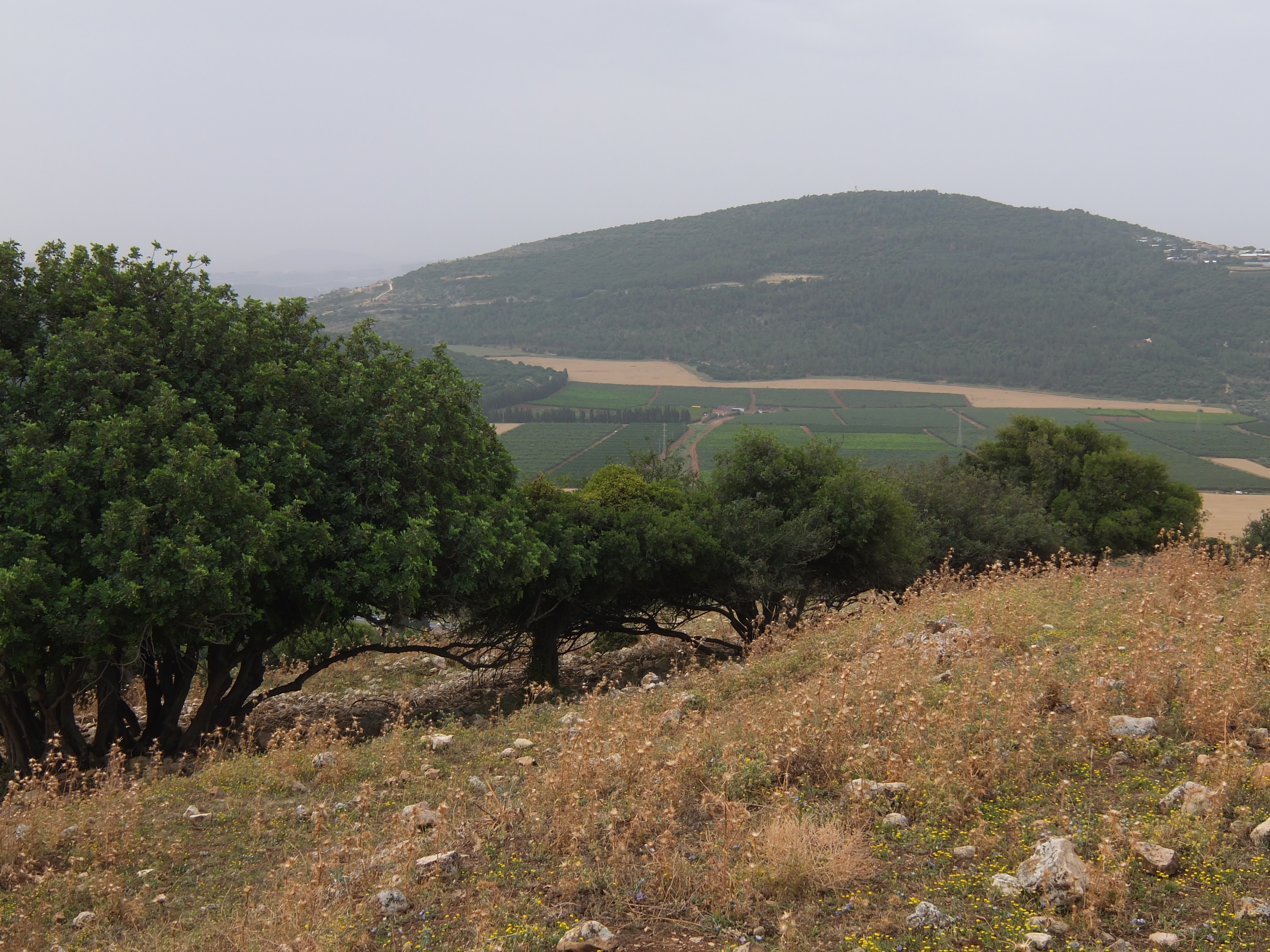
View from Bersabe in Galilee

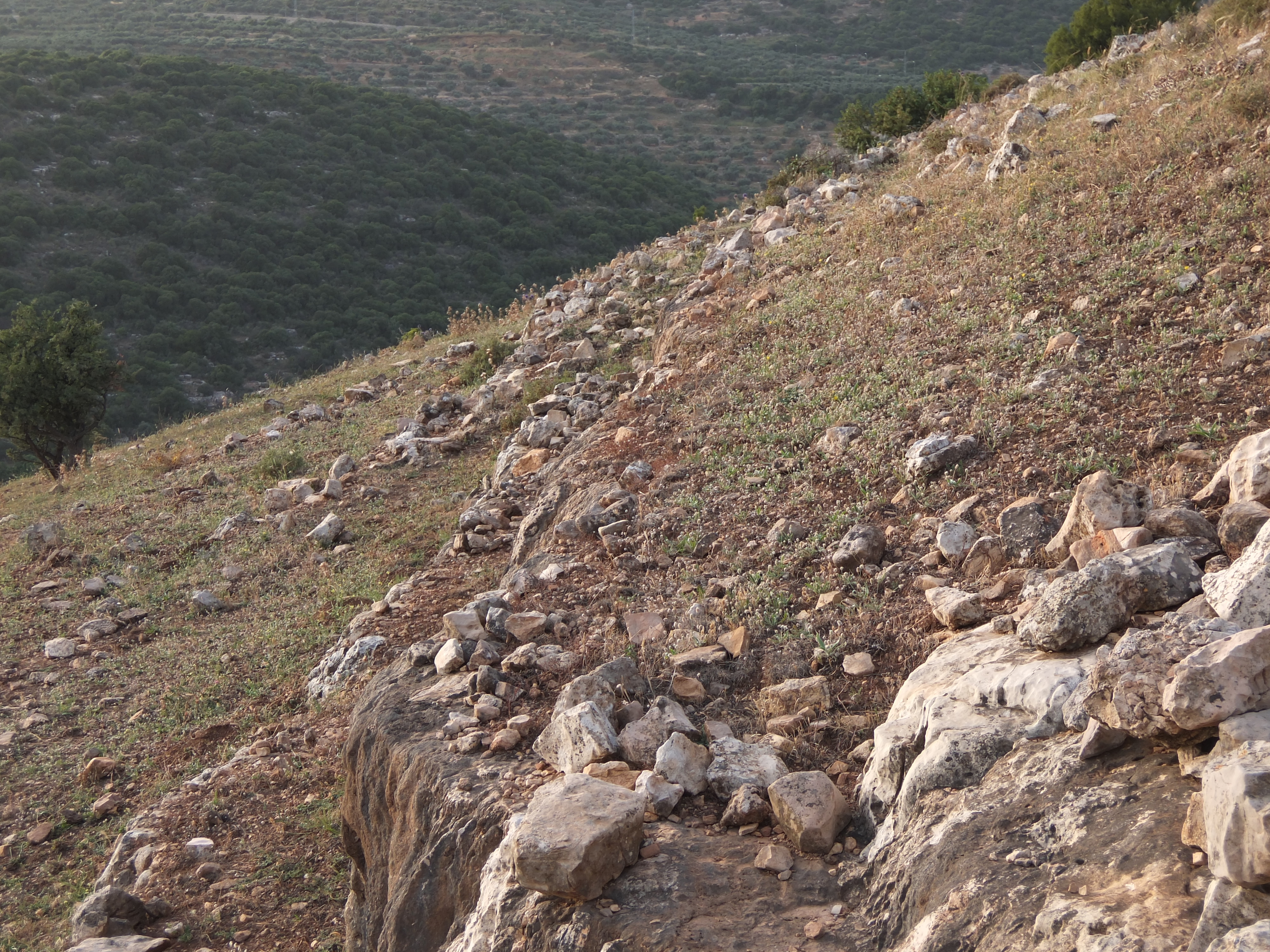
Steep ascent to Khirbet Abu esh-Sheba (Bersabe)

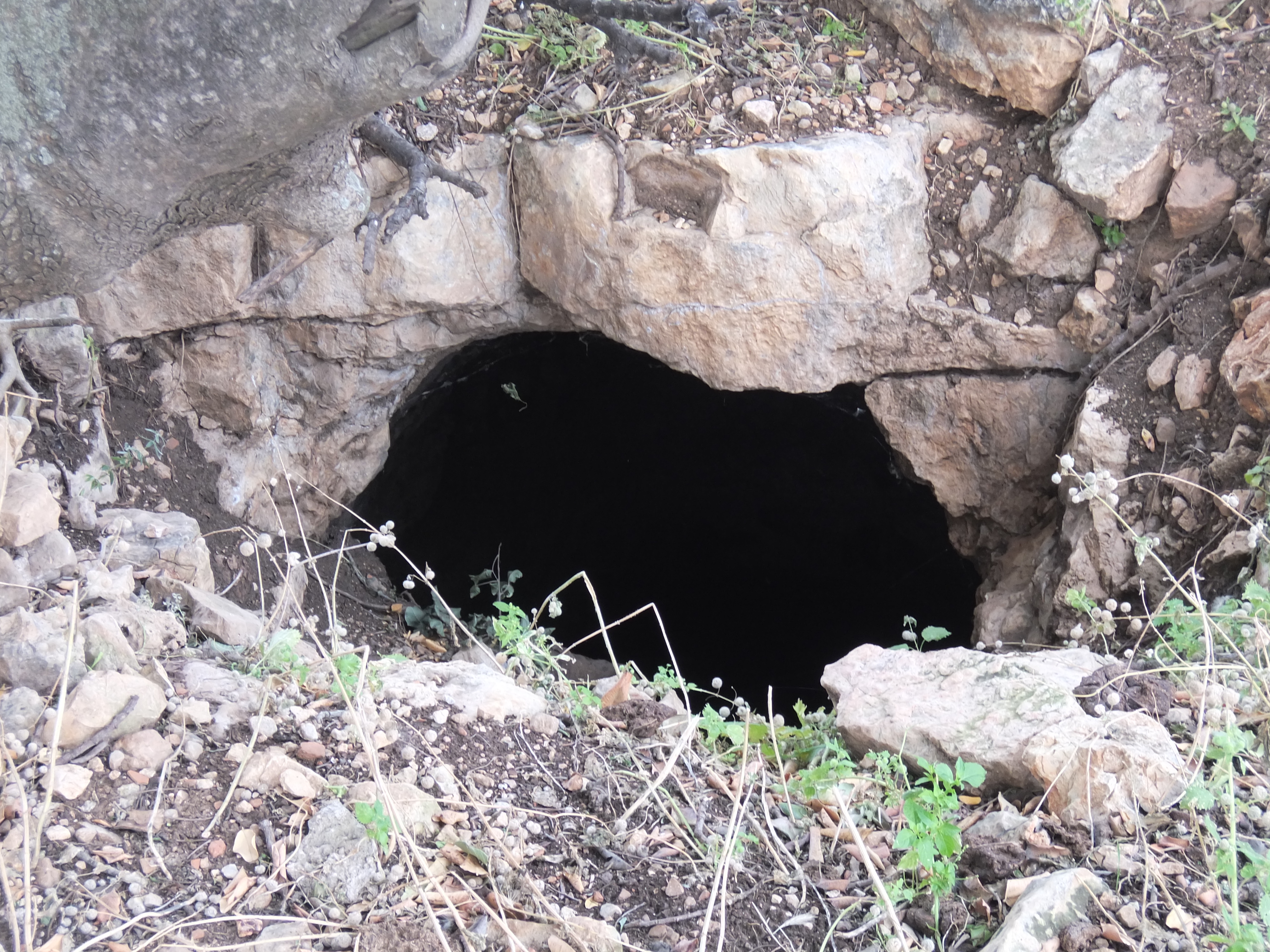
Cave at Bersabe (Kh. Abu esh-Sheba)

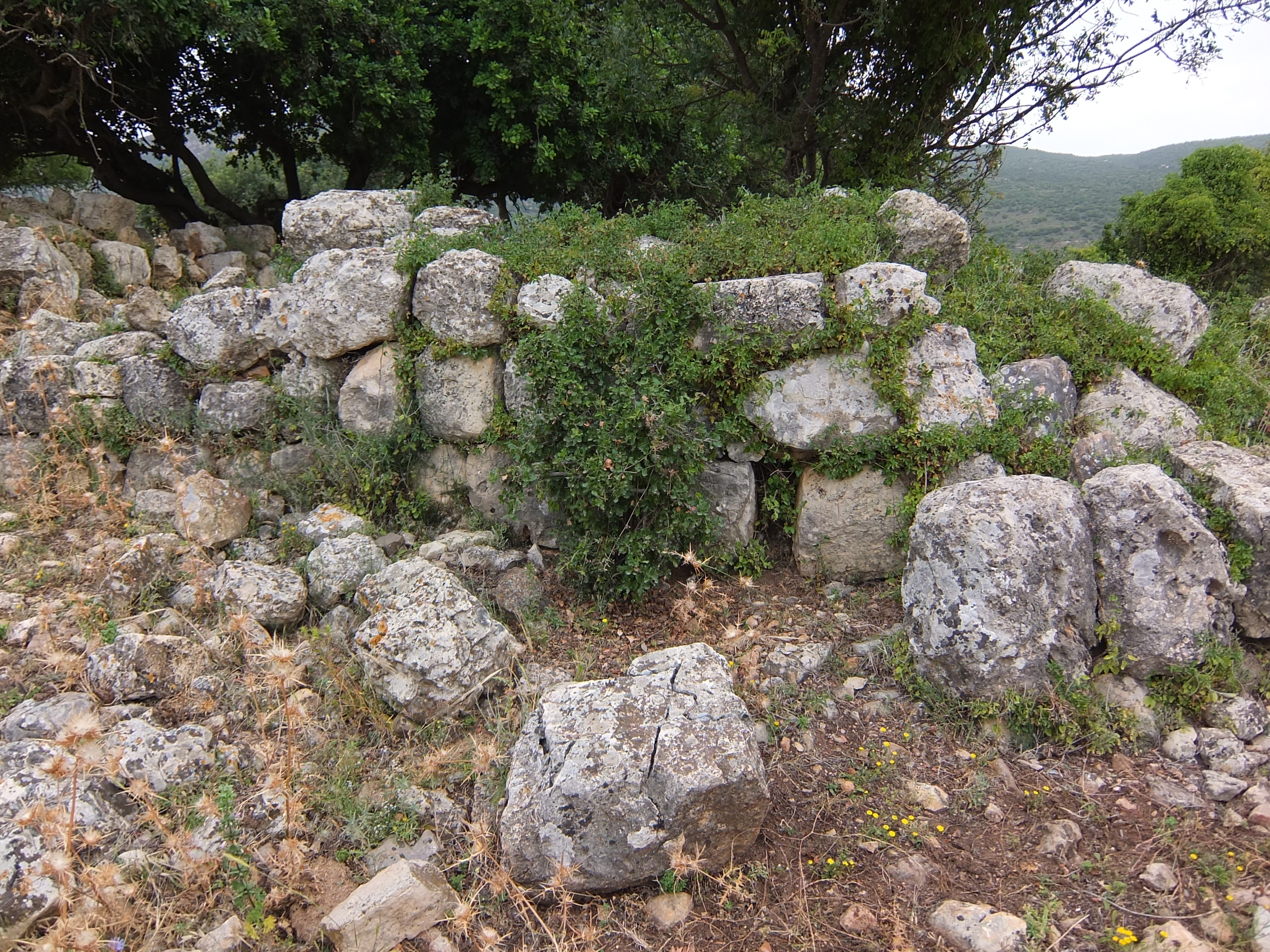
Old wall in Bersabe

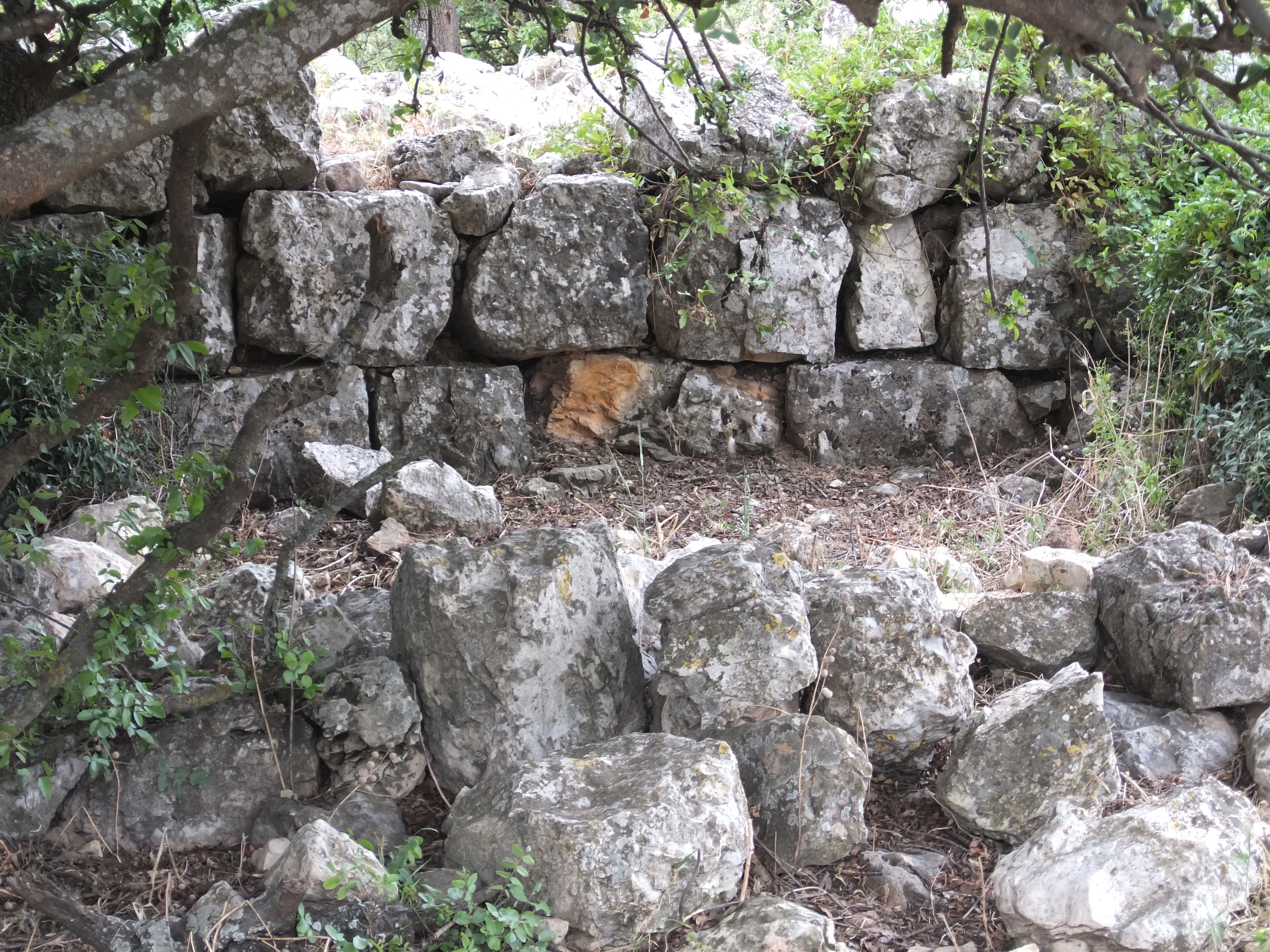
Ruins of Bersabe

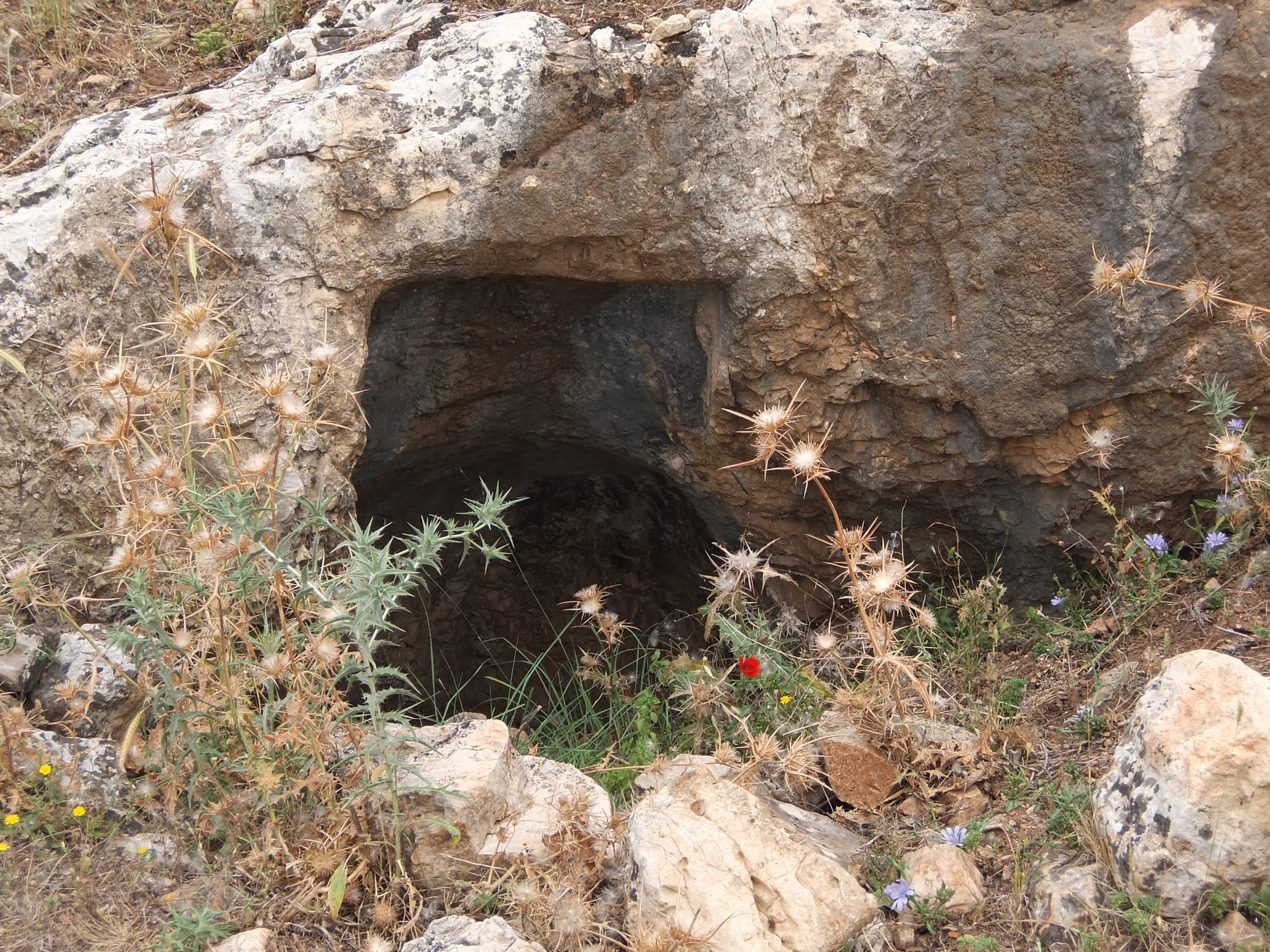
Tomb carved from rock at Bersabe

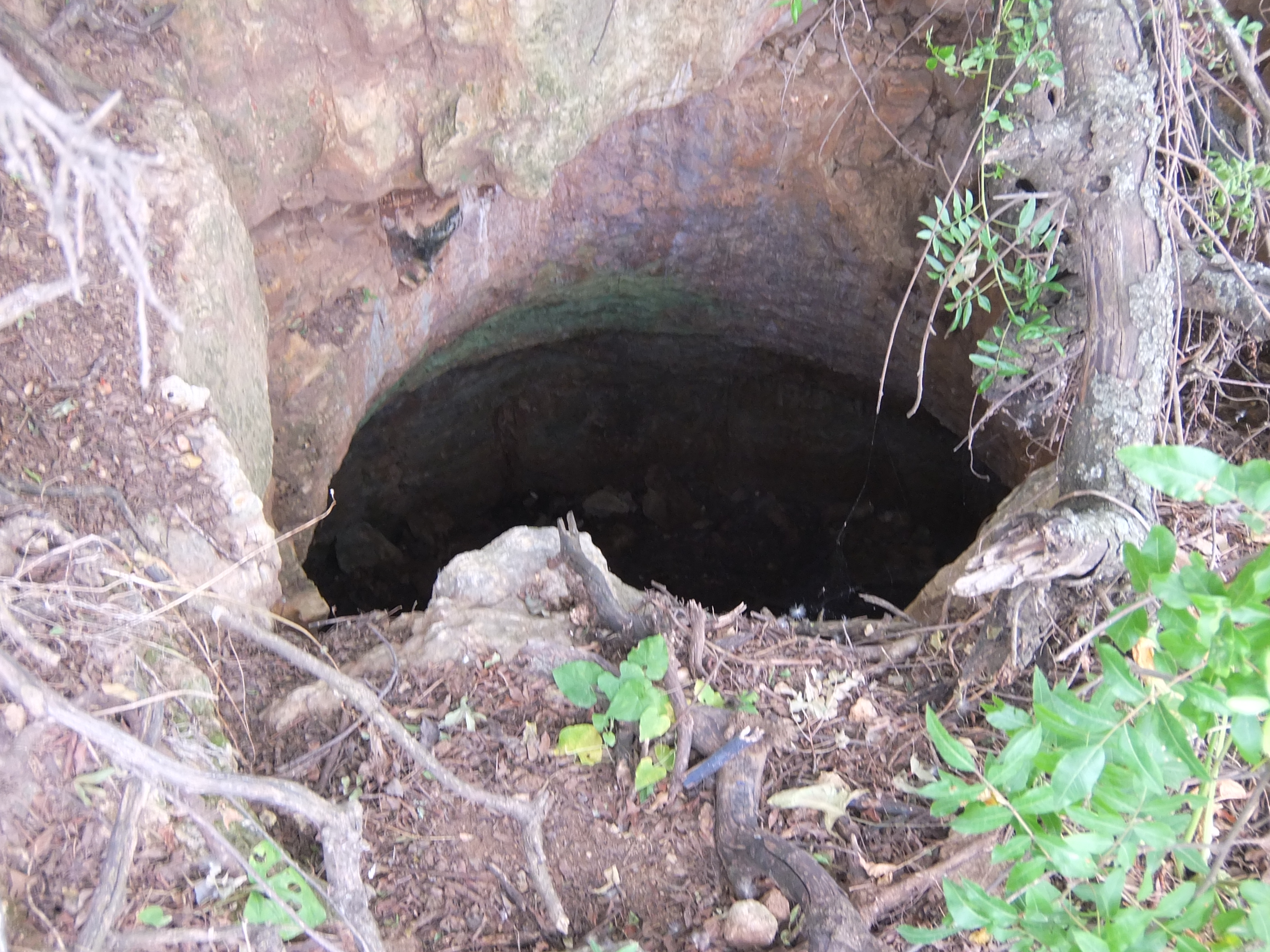
Pit at Bersabe (Khirbet Abu esh-Sheba)

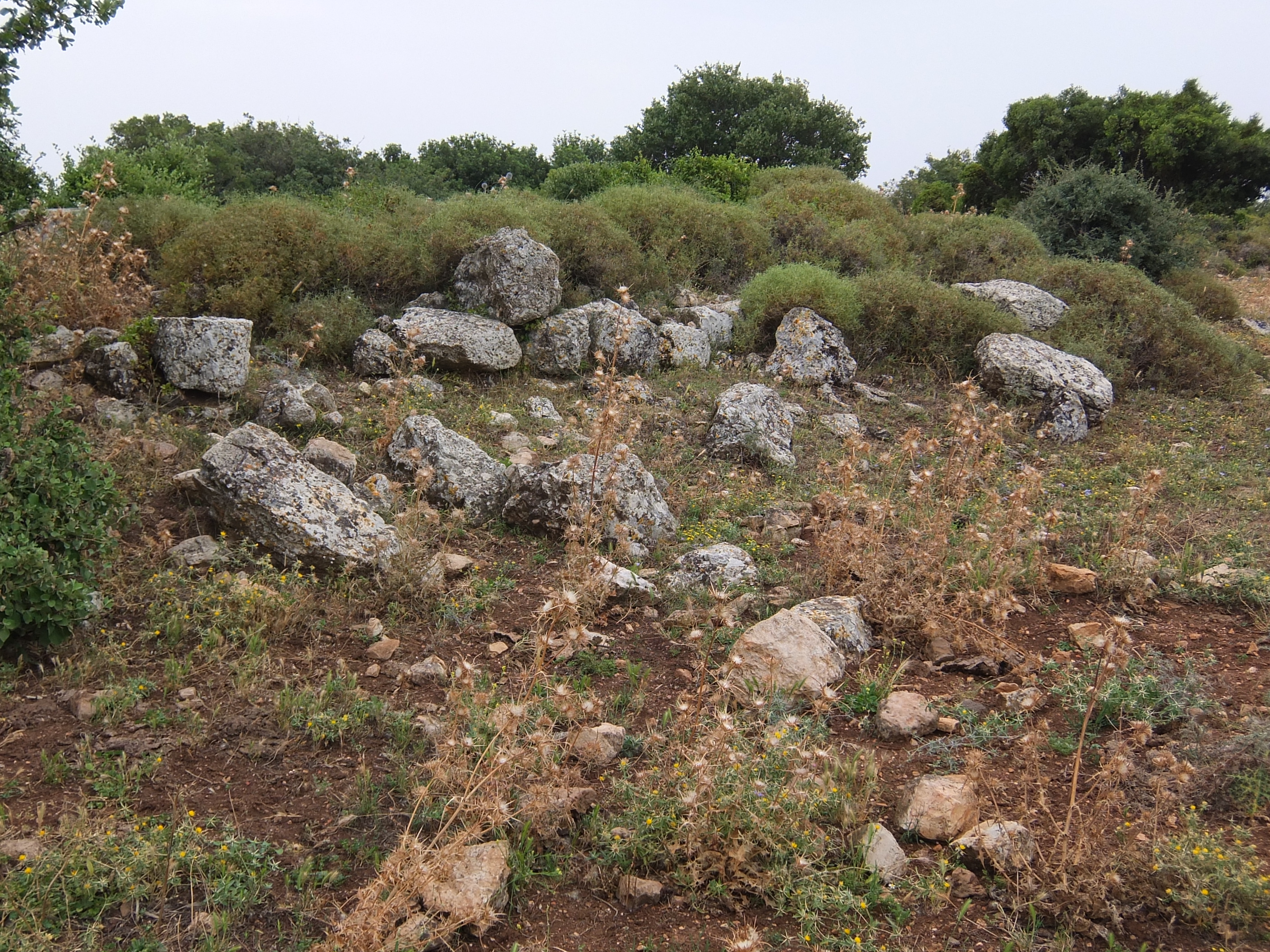
Ruins at Bersabe

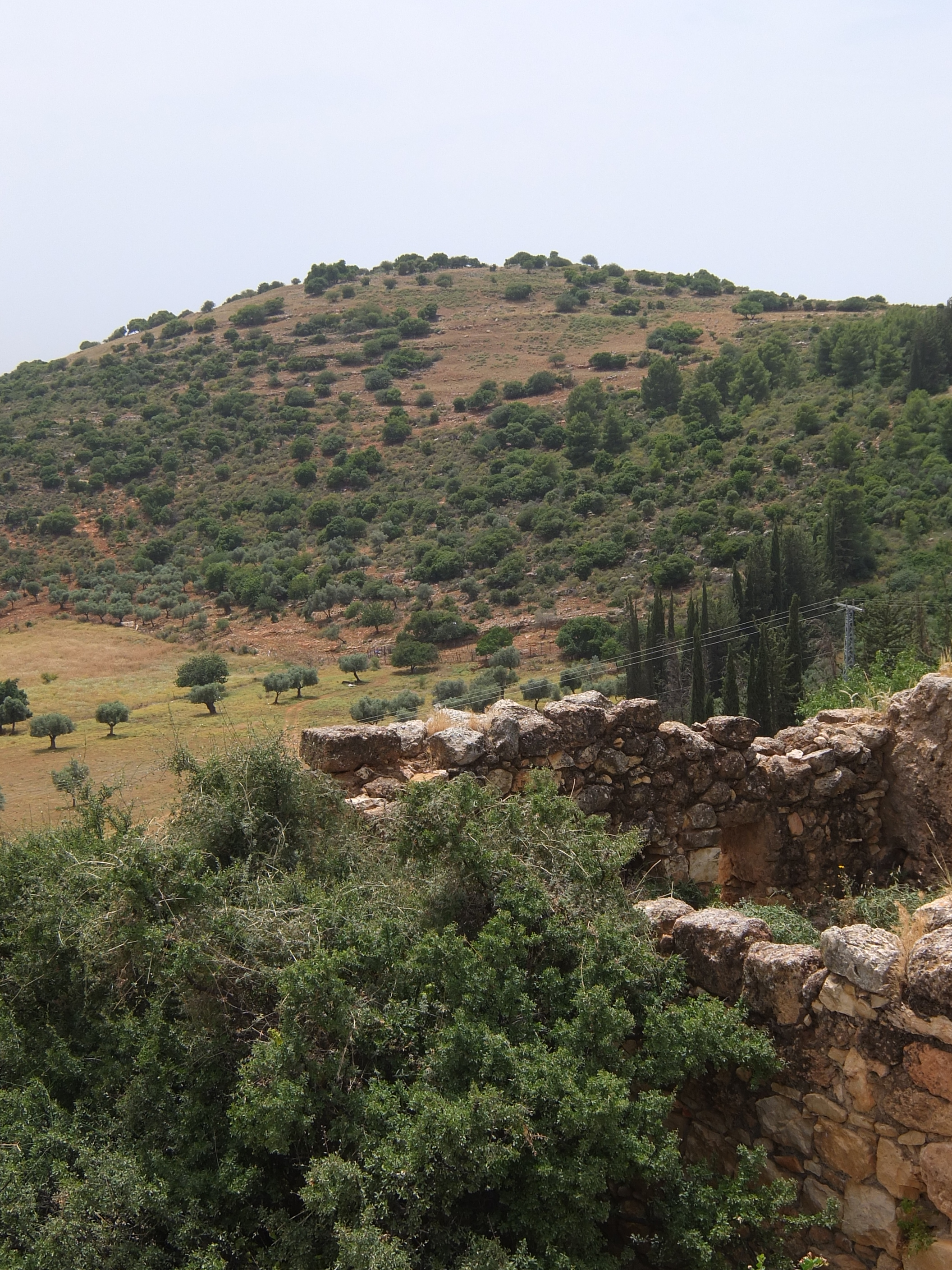
Hilltop ruin of Khirbet Abu esh-Sheba as seen from Farradiyya

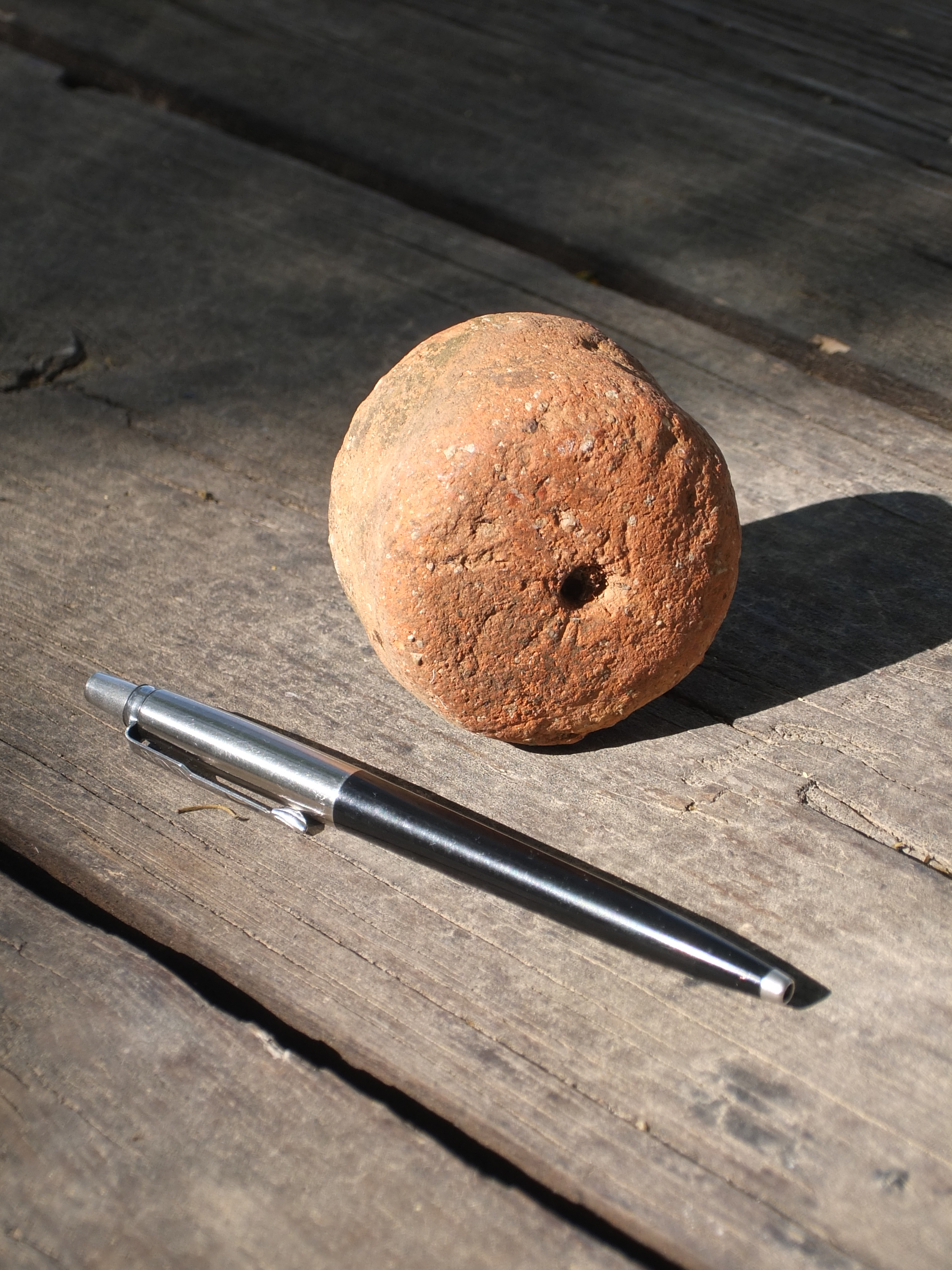
Loom weight discovered in Khirbet Abu esh-Sheba

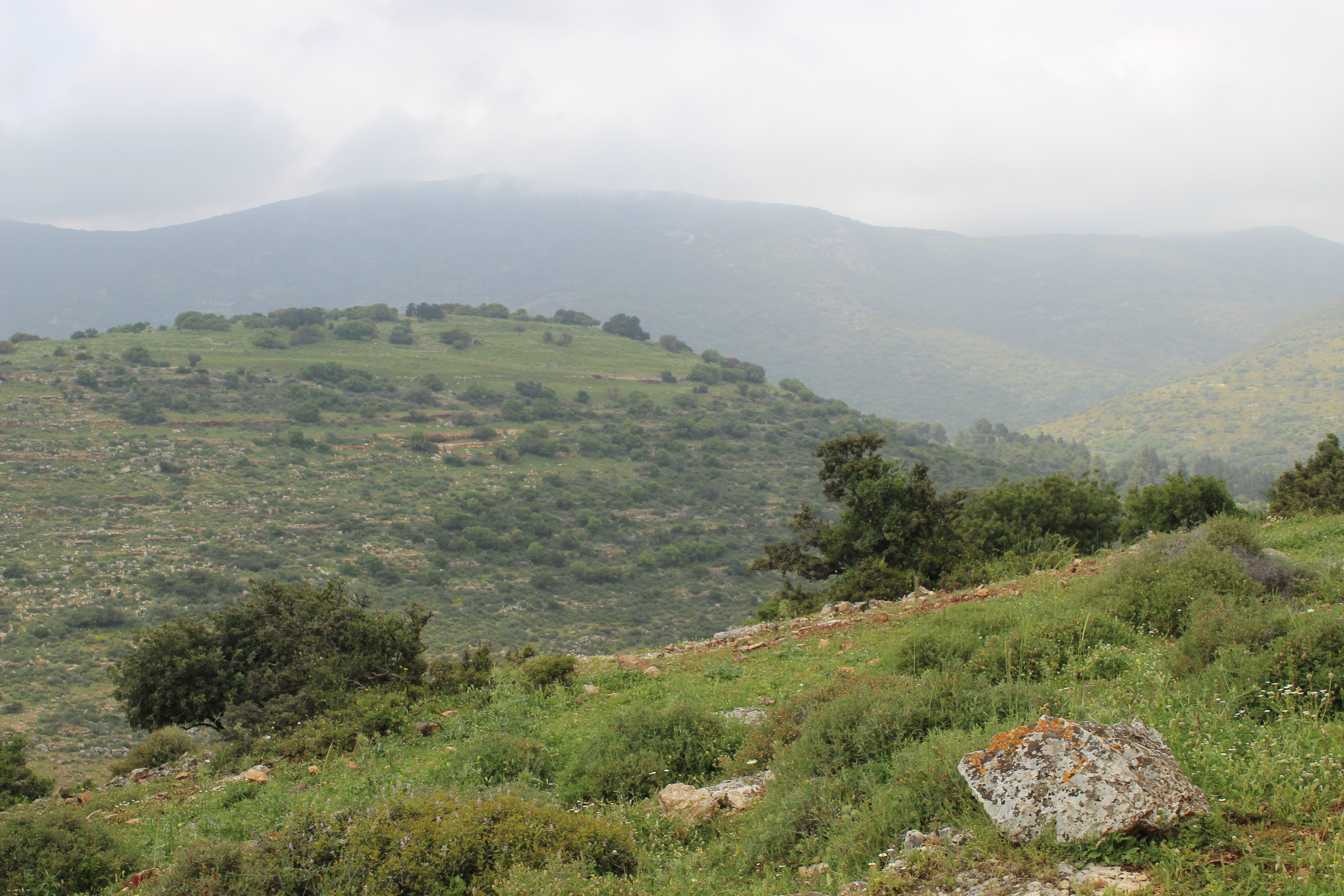
Hilltop ruin of Bersabe as seen from Kafr 'Inan

== Bibliography ==
- Aviam, Mordechai (1983). "The Location and Function of Josephus' Fortifications in Galilee". Cathedra: For the History of Eretz Israel and Its Yishuv. 28: 33–46. JSTOR 23398973.
- Aviam, Mordechai (2004). Jews, Pagans and Christians in the Galilee (Land of Galilee 1). Rochester: University of Rochester Press. ISBN 1-58046-171-9.
- Aviam, Mordechai (2008). The Great Revolt in Galilee (Exhibition Catalogue 28), Hecht Museum, University of Haifa: Haifa, pp. 39–52 ISBN 965-7034-18-3
- Avi-Yonah, M. (1953). "The Missing Fortress of Flavius Josephus". Israel Exploration Journal. 3 (2): 94–98. JSTOR 27924515.
- Conder, C.R.; Kitchener, H.H. (1881). The Survey of Western Palestine: Memoirs of the Topography, Orography, Hydrography, and Archaeology. Vol. 1. London: Committee of the Palestine Exploration Fund.
- Josephus; Thackeray, H. StJ. [translator] (1989). The Jewish War (Loeb Classical Library ed.). Cambridge Massachusetts: Harvard University Press. ISBN 0-674-99223-7.
- Mason, S., ed. (2001), "Josephus' Galilee in Archaeological Perspective", Life of Josephus, Flavius Josephus: Translation and Commentary, vol. 9, Leiden: Brill, ISBN 9004117938
- Thomsen, Peter (1966). Loca Sancta. Hildesheim. (Leipzig 1907)
