= Battle of Beersheba (1938) =

- Part of 1936–1939 Arab revolt in Palestine
Date	9–10 September 1938
Location	Beersheba, Mandatory Palestine
Result	Palestinian Arab victory

Belligerents
Palestinian Arab Rebels	Mandatory Palestine

Commanders and leaders
Abd Al-Halim Al-Julani ("Shalaf") (Military commander of the Hebron)	(Mandatory Palestine) Unknown British police chief †

Strength
500 rebels	(Mandatory Palestine) Unknown

Casualties and losses
Unknown	Tens injured One missing 250 rifles and machine guns 50 ammo boxes 50 pistols 200 bombs

The Battle of Beersheba took place between Palestinian rebels and the British Mandate forces and led to the rebels taking control of the city.

== Battle ==
The rebels, with the aid of teachers within the city, kept track of the British army's movements over a lengthy period. This operation was conducted in secrecy and surprise as the British thought Beersheba would not be attacked due to its isolation and lack of Zionist settlers. Al-Jolani commanded a group of insurgents to be stationed on the Jerusalem-Hebron route, and another group to guard south of Hebron and block off the Gaza-Hebron road. This operation was initiated at midday on 9 September, after encircling the town.

The rebels seized 100 old rifles, a large number of helmets and clothes, and a rapid-fire machine gun, along with two bags of spare parts for it. The rebels later used it to shoot down two British planes in the battle of Jourat Bahlas. The rebels also released prisoners.

The rebels did not set up any form of government in the city, as Beersheba was mainly seen as a revolutionary stronghold and the British had limited sway there. Authority over Beersheba was completely regained only in November.

The locals greeted the rebels with ululation and rose water.
