= Amalia Levanoni =

Israeli historian (born 1944)

- עמליה לבנוני
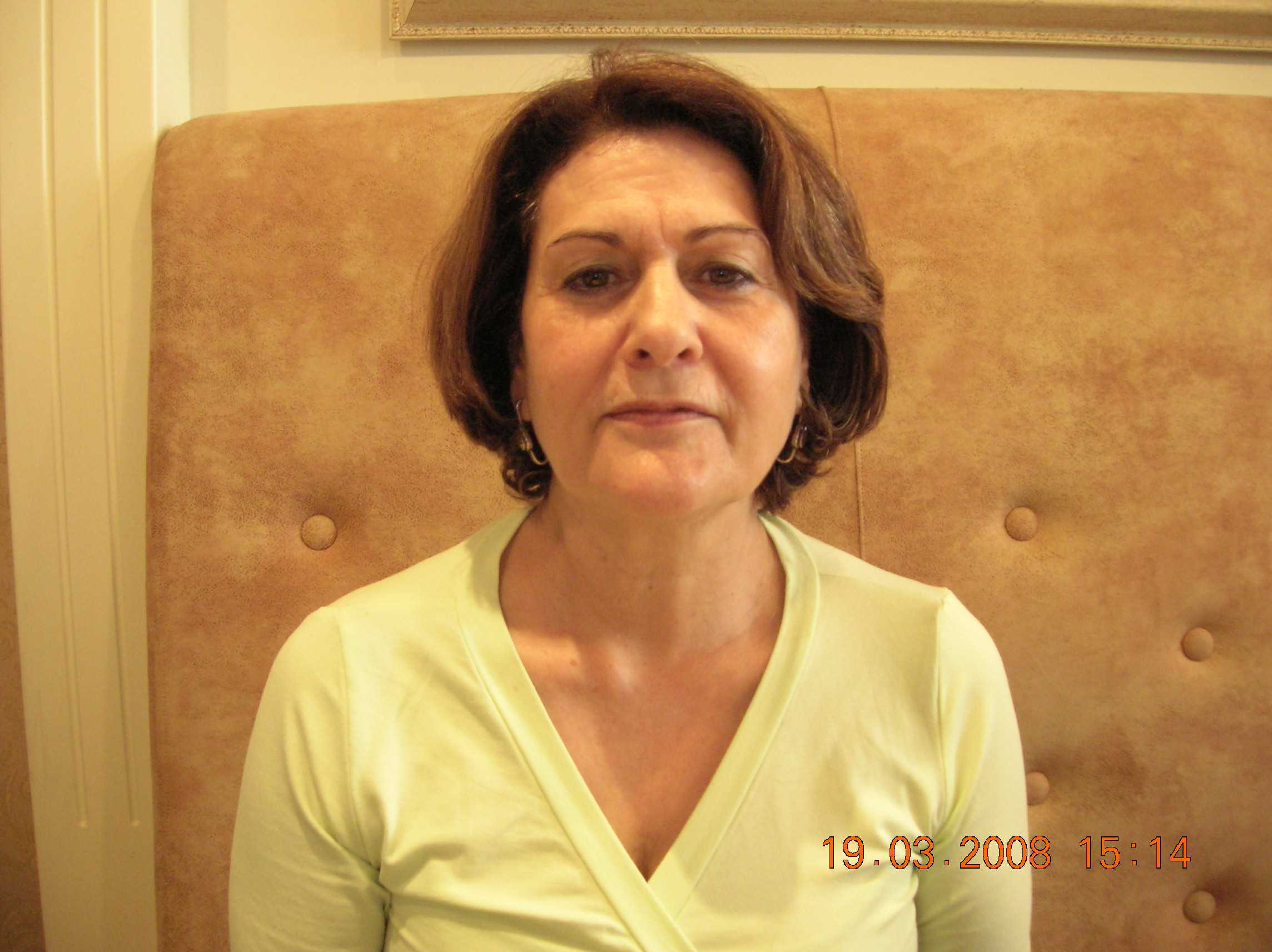
- Levanoni in 2008
- Born: 22 June 1944 (age 82); Basra, Iraq
- Occupations: Historian, professor

Academic background
- Education: University of Haifa; Hebrew University of Jerusalem
- Doctoral advisor: Nehemia Levtzion

Academic work
- Institutions: University of Haifa

Amalia Levanoni (Hebrew: עמליה לבנוני; born 22 June 1944) is an Israeli historian and professor emeritus in the Department of Middle Eastern and Islamic Studies at the University of Haifa. She specializes in the history of Mamluks and the Mamluk Sultanate.

She was born in Basra, Iraq. She immigrated with her family in 1951 and has lived in Haifa since 1959. She studied at the University of Haifa and then at the Hebrew University of Jerusalem for her doctorate degree, which she received in 1990 in Islamic history. Her advisor was Nehemia Levtzion.

== Books ==
=== Author ===
- Levanoni, Amalia (1995). A Turning Point in Mamluk History: The Third Reign of al-Nāsir Muḥammad Ibn Qalāwūn (1310-1341). Leiden Boston: Brill. ISBN 978-9004101821.

=== Editor ===
- Egypt and Syria under Mamluk rule: political, social and cultural aspects. Leiden; Boston: Brill. 2022. ISBN 978-9004459519.
