= Moses ben Mordecai Bassola =

Rabbi and traveler

- משה באסולה

Personal life
- Born: 1480 Pesaro, Papal States
- Died: 1560 (aged 79–80) Safed, Ottoman Empire

Religious life
- Religion: Judaism

Moses ben Mordecai Bassola, also known as Moses Bassola, Moshe Basola, Basilea, or Basila (Hebrew באסולה or simply: משה באסולה; alternative Hebrew spelling: באזלה ,איש באזולה ,ב(א)סולה ,באסל ,באזילא); was born in 1480 in Pesaro, Italy, and died in 1560. He was a rabbi and a cabalist. His travel book has been published in English and modern Hebrew by Abraham David under the title In Zion and Jerusalem: The Itinerary of Rabbi Moses Basola.

== Biography ==
Since he called himself Ẓarfati (the Frenchman), his family most likely originated from France. R. Moses was the son of a famous rabbinical family in the Land of Israel and in Italy, living between the 15th century to the 18th century. His last name shows that the family probably originated from Basel (the Latin form of the name is Basilea) in Switzerland. He served in his youth in his hometown of Pesaro as a rabbi.

=== Levant tour (1521–1523) ===
In 1521, he sailed to the Ottoman Levant via Cyprus and Crete and toured it for a year and a half. His impressions from this visit are documented in his book Sefer Masaot, in which he describes various sites in Ottoman Palestine (partial list), such as Bar'am, Ein al-Zeitun, Safed, Meron, Kefar Hananiah, 'Akbara, Peki'in, Ammuqa, Gush Halav, Dalton, Huqoq, Nablus, Jerusalem, Hebron, among other places.

In every place he visited, Bassola described the inhabitants of the land, the number of Jews living in each locality and their important occupations, including the burial sites of the righteous, synagogues, etc. During this period, Bassola resided in the settlement of Ein Zeitim, which had then a Jewish community of forty families. The book became a primary source of information for Jewish life in Ottoman Palestine and the local attractions during those years.

=== Later life ===
After returning to the Italian peninsula, Bassola lived in Ancona and headed the yeshiva there. In his later years, Bassola made aliyah to the Land of Israel and settled in Safed, where he was in a close relationship with the rabbis of the city, Especially with Rabbi Moses ben Jacob Cordovero. Bassola's son, Azriel ben Moses Bassola, was a scholar, whom among his students was Leon of Modena.
