= Central Lower Galilee Natural Region =

Coordinates: 32°52′35″N 35°27′08″E

- Natural Region
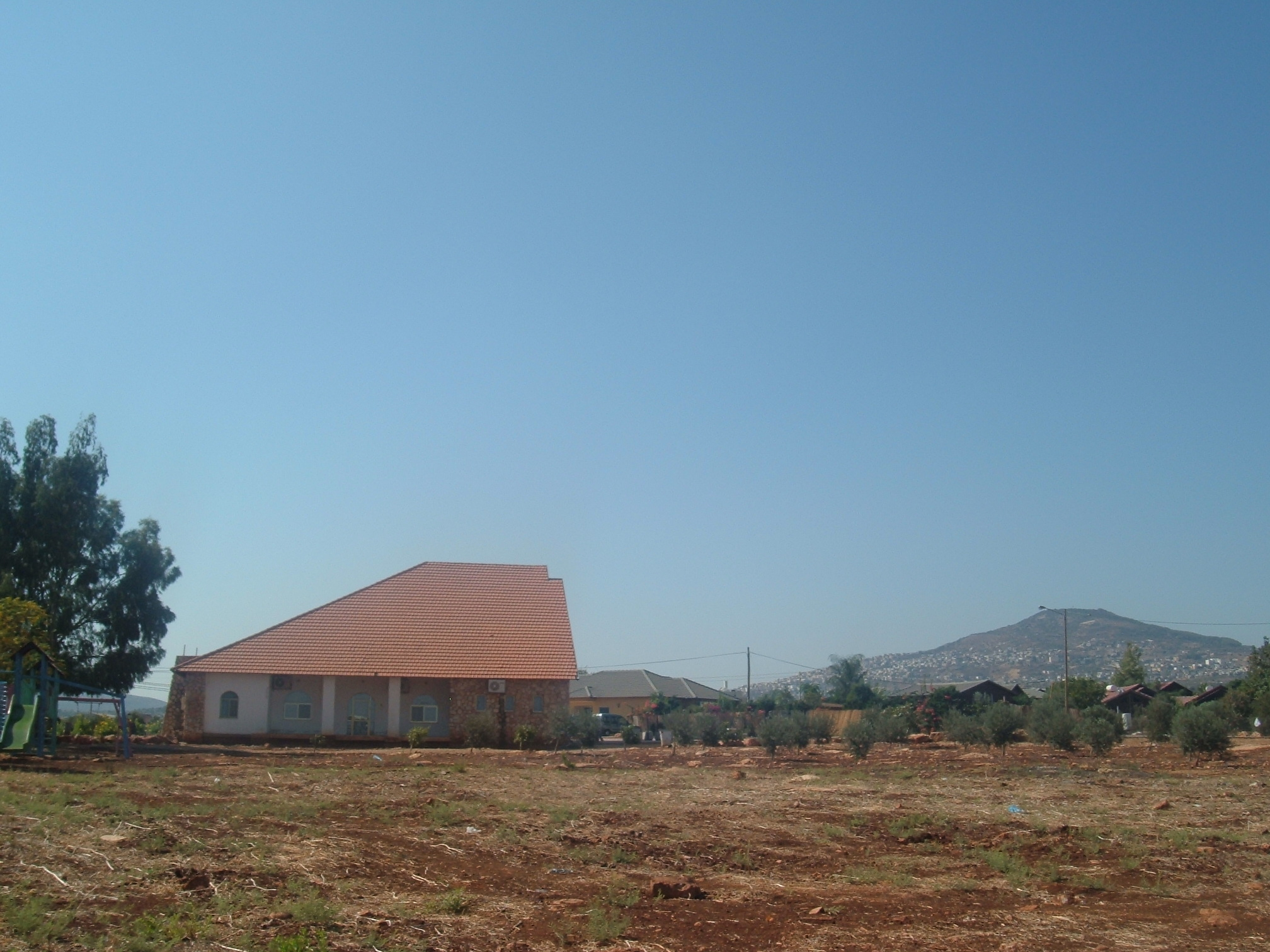
- Synagogue in Kalanit
- Interactive map of Central Lower Galilee Natural Region
- Country: Israel
- District: Northern
- Subdistrict: Safed
- Largest City: Tefahot

Population (2024)
  - Total: 2,057

Ethnicity
  - Jews and others: 99.2%
  - Arabs: 0.1%

The Central Lower Galilee Natural Region is a natural region in the Safed Subdistrict, in the Northern District of Israel. Tefahot is the largest town in the natural region.

== Geography ==
Districts, Subdistricts and Natural Regions of the State of Israel, 2018

The natural region consists of five villages, located south of Highway 85 near the larger town of Maghar (which is located in the Eastern Lower Galilee natural region of the Kinneret Subdistrict). The remainder of the Lower Galilee, to the west and southwest, is mostly part of the Nazareth-Tir'an Mountains Natural Region and Shefar'am Natural Region, which are in the Jezreel and Acre subdistricts respectively. It is the least populous natural region in the Northern District, and one of the least populous in Israel. Four of the villages in the natural region are part of the Merom HaGalil Regional Council, while the fifth is part of the Upper Galilee Regional Council.

== Demographics ==
All five villages of the natural region are Jewish villages.

Historical population
Year	Pop.	±%
1972	200	—
1983	800	+300.0%
1995	1,400	+75.0%
2008	1,400	+0.0%
2022	1,885	+34.6%
2024	2,057	+9.1%

== Administrative local authorities ==
Cities	Local Councils	Villages
[None]	[None]	Merom HaGalil: Hazon; Kalanit; Livnim; Tefahot; Upper Galilee: Kadarim

== Voting Patterns ==
In the 2022 election, 69 percent of voters in the natural region voted for the parties of the right-wing coalition led by Benjamin Netanyahu, while 28 percent voted for the parties of the center-left coalition led by Yair Lapid and 0.1 percent voted for the Arab parties.

In the 2026 election, 63 percent of voters in the natural region voted for the parties of the right-wing coalition led by Benjamin Netanyahu, while 31 percent voted for the parties of the center-left coalition led by Gadi Eisenkot and 0.4 percent voted for the Arab parties. An additional 3.5 percent voted for the Reservists, and 2.4 percent voted for Amcha Yisrael. Voter turnout increased 18 percent from the 2022 election.
