= Al-Mansura, Tiberias =

Al-Mansura المنصورة
- Village
- Etymology: Building
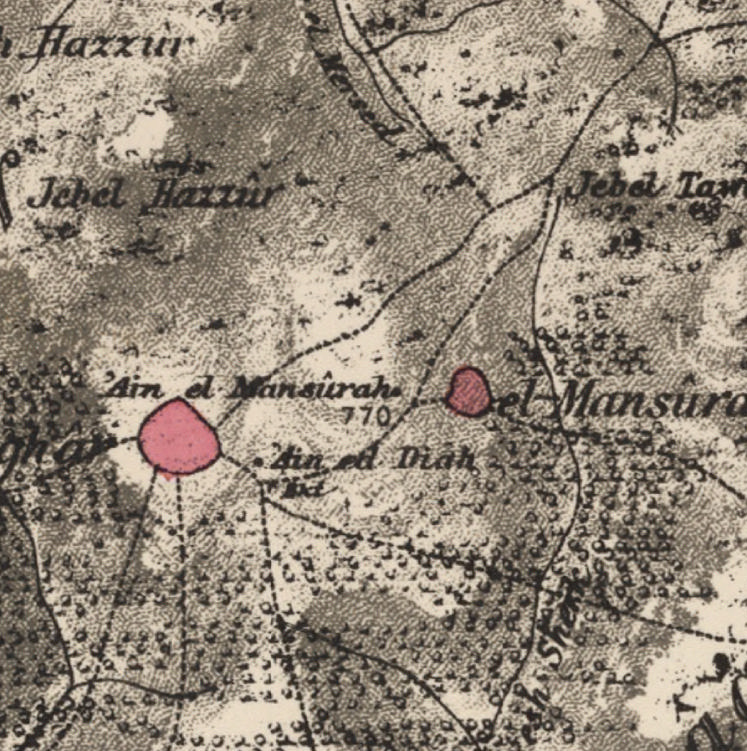
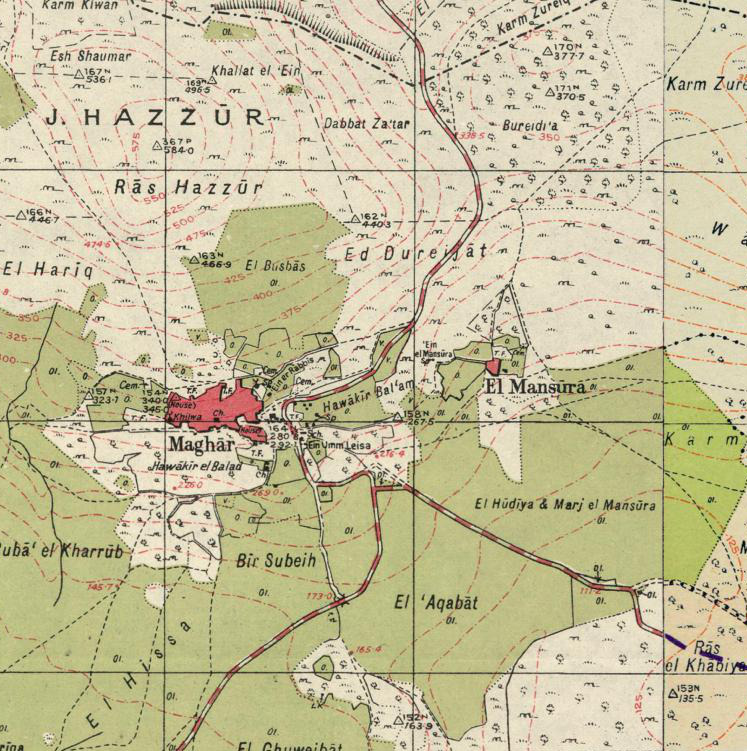
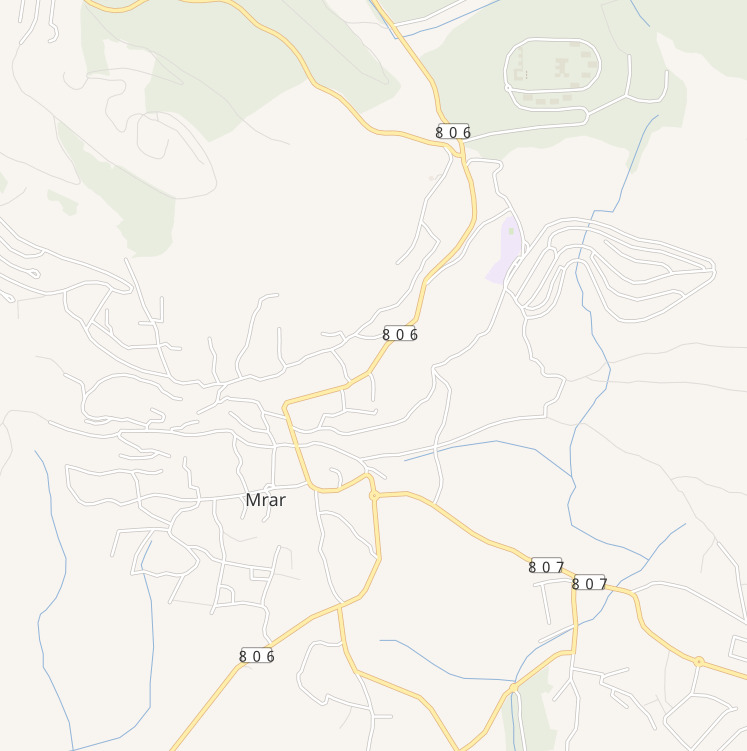
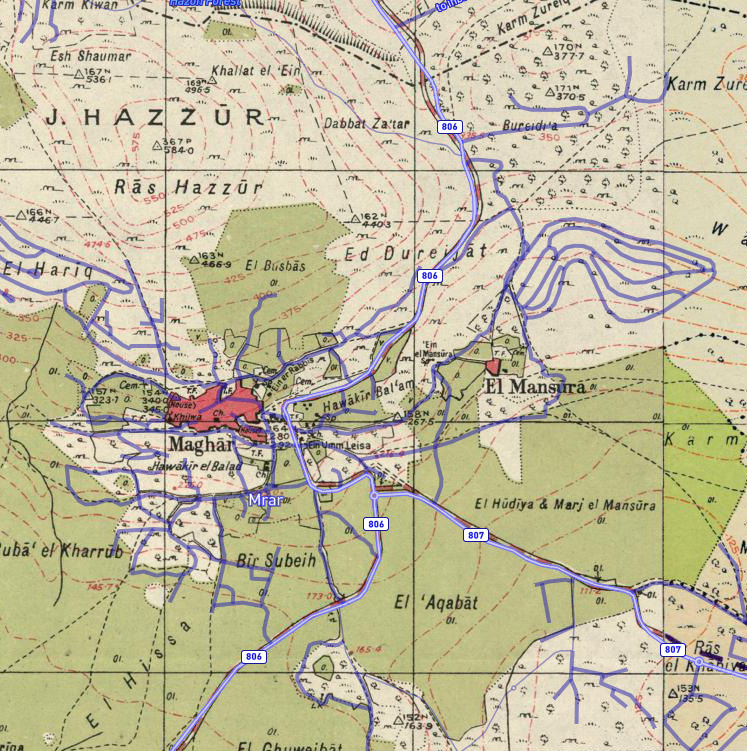
- 1870s map 1940s map modern map 1940s with modern overlay map A series of historical maps of the area around Al-Mansura, Tiberias (click the buttons)

- Location within Mandatory Palestine
- Coordinates: 32°53′29″N 35°25′01″E
- Palestine grid: 189/255
- Geopolitical entity: Mandatory Palestine
- Subdistrict: Tiberias
- Date of depopulation: May 10, 1948

Population
  - Total: 2,140 together with Maghar
- Current Localities: Chazon Tefashot, Kallanit, Ravid

Al-Mansura (Arabic: المنصورة) was a Palestinian Arab village in the Tiberias Subdistrict. It was depopulated during the 1947–1948 Civil War in Mandatory Palestine on May 10, 1948. It was located 16 kilometres northwest of Tiberias.

== History ==
Al-Mansura, like the rest of Palestine, was incorporated into the Ottoman Empire in 1517, and in the census of 1596, the village was located in the nahiya of Tabariyya, part of Safad Sanjak. It had a population of 16 households, all Muslim. The villagers paid a fixed tax-rate of 25% on agricultural products, including wheat, barley, rice, goats and beehives, in addition to occasional revenues; the taxes totalled 530 akçe.

In 1838, el-Mansura was noted as a Druze village in the Esh-Shagur district, located between Safad, Acca and Tiberias.

In 1875 Victor Guérin found the village to have 200 Druze. In 1881, the PEF's Survey of Western Palestine described El Mansurah as "A stone-built village, situated on the slope of the hill, containing about 150 Moslems; extensive olive-groves to the south; water from springs and cisterns."

=== British Mandate era ===
In the 1922 census of Palestine, conducted by the British Mandate authorities, Mughar wa Mansura had a total population of 1377. Of these, 265 were Muslim, 676 Druze and 436 Christians. All the Christians were Roman Catholic. In the 1931 census the population of Al-Mansura, together with nearby Maghar, was a total of 1733, in 373 inhabited houses. Of these, 307 were Muslim, 549 Christians, and 877 Druze.

In the 1945 statistics the population of Al-Mansura, together with nearby Maghar, was 2,140; 90 Muslims, 800 Christians and 1,250 others. They had 55,583 dunams of land according to an official land and population survey. 7,864 dunams were plantations and irrigable land, 18,352 for cereals, while 55 dunams were built-up land.

=== Post 1948 ===
In 1992, the village site was described: "The site is covered with debris and overgrown with cacti, olive trees and tall grass. Remains of walls are visible, with one door made of stone with an arched door. Another wall is perforated with its interior bars exposed, signs of having been blasted with dynamite."

== Bibliography ==
- Barron, J.B., ed. (1923). Palestine: Report and General Abstracts of the Census of 1922. Government of Palestine.
- Conder, C.R.; Kitchener, H.H. (1881). The Survey of Western Palestine: Memoirs of the Topography, Orography, Hydrography, and Archaeology. Vol. 1. London: Committee of the Palestine Exploration Fund.
- Government of Palestine, Department of Statistics (1945). Village Statistics, April, 1945.
- Guérin, V. (1868). Description Géographique Historique et Archéologique de la Palestine (in French). Vol. 1: Judee, pt. 1. Paris: L'Imprimerie Nationale.
- Hadawi, S. (1970). Village Statistics of 1945: A Classification of Land and Area ownership in Palestine. Palestine Liberation Organization Research Center. Archived from the original on 2018-12-08.
- Hütteroth, W.-D.; Abdulfattah, K. (1977). Historical Geography of Palestine, Transjordan and Southern Syria in the Late 16th Century. Erlanger Geographische Arbeiten, Sonderband 5. Erlangen, Germany: Vorstand der Fränkischen Geographischen Gesellschaft. ISBN 3-920405-41-2.
- Khalidi, W. (1992). All That Remains: The Palestinian Villages Occupied and Depopulated by Israel in 1948. Washington D.C.: Institute for Palestine Studies. ISBN 0-88728-224-5.
- Mills, E., ed. (1932). Census of Palestine 1931. Population of Villages, Towns and Administrative Areas. Jerusalem: Government of Palestine.
- Morris, B. (2004). The Birth of the Palestinian Refugee Problem Revisited. Cambridge University Press. ISBN 978-0-521-00967-6.
- Palmer, E.H. (1881). The Survey of Western Palestine: Arabic and English Name Lists Collected During the Survey by Lieutenants Conder and Kitchener, R. E. Transliterated and Explained by E.H. Palmer. Committee of the Palestine Exploration Fund.
- Rhode, H. (1979). Administration and Population of the Sancak of Safed in the Sixteenth Century (PhD). Columbia University. Archived from the original on 2020-03-01.
- Robinson, E.; Smith, E. (1841). Biblical Researches in Palestine, Mount Sinai and Arabia Petraea: A Journal of Travels in the year 1838. Vol. 3. Boston: Crocker & Brewster.
