= Tefahot =

Tefahot: טְפָחוֹת (Hebrew)
- Location within Northeast Israel
- Coordinates: 32°52′9″N 35°25′21″E
- Country: Israel
- District: Northern
- Subdistrict: Safed
- Council: Merom HaGalil
- Affiliation: Hapoel HaMizrachi
- Founded: 1980
- Founder: Moshavniks
- Population (2024): 531

Tefahot (Hebrew: טְפָחוֹת) is a religious moshav in northern Israel. Located in the Galilee, several hundred meters south of Maghar, it falls under the jurisdiction of Merom HaGalil Regional Council. In 2024 it had a population of 531.

== History ==
Tefahot was established in 1980, on the lands of the depopulated Palestinian village of Al-Mansura, south of the village site.

It was founded by children of nearby moshavim and with support from the Jewish Agency and was named for the hill on which it is located.
