= Norway–Palestine relations =

Bilateral relations

- Norway: Palestine

Norway–Palestine relations are relations between the Kingdom of Norway and the State of Palestine. Palestine has a diplomatic mission in Oslo, while Norway has a representative office in Al-Ram. Norway recognized the State of Palestine on 28 May 2024.

== History ==
The Labour Party, the ruling party in the 1940s, held a pro-Israel position. For the majority of non-Socialist and Christians Norwegians, the new Jewish state represented the realization of the Prophecies of the Old Testament. Norway was described as the most pro-Israel of the three Nordic countries. However, Labour's support for Israel was not indisputable, as in 1945 the party considered the establishment of a Jewish state to be "not possible and unfair". The party's proposal for the Jewish problem was non-Zionist, assimilating Jews into their respective European countries.

After Knut Frydenlund became foreign minister in 1973, he played a crucial role in promoting Palestinian demands early in his political career. However, in 1974, Norway was among eight states voting against granting the PLO observer status in the United Nations General Assembly.

Norway helped orchestrate the 1993 Oslo Accords. For the signing of the Oslo Accords, the Norwegian Nobel Committee awarded the 1994 Nobel Peace Prize.

To communicate better with the PLO headquarters in Tunis, Norway also established an embassy in the Tunisian capital in 2007.

The Norwegian government upgraded the Palestinian mission in Oslo to an embassy in December 2010 and called for a Palestinian state within the following year. In January 2011, Foreign Minister Jonas Gahr Støre stated that if negotiations with Israel failed by September, Norway would recognize Palestine within the United Nations framework. After meeting with Abbas in July 2011, Støre said it was legitimate for Palestinians to seek a vote on statehood, emphasizing that people have the right to use UN institutions to clarify their status.

In May 2017, a terrorist who took part in the 1978 Coastal Road massacre, where 38 Israeli civilians, including 13 children, were killed, was commemorated on a women's center by an agency of the Palestinian Authority. The center was built with the aid of the government of Norway and UN Women. Norway's Foreign Minister demanded that Norway's funding for the building be repaid and its logo removed from the building. He said that "Norway will not allow itself to be associated with institutions that take the names of terrorists in this way".

In June 2022, the Norwegian government announced the start of labelling products from settlements following the EU approach.

On 27 October 2023, Norway was one of 121 countries to vote in favor of a General Assembly resolution calling for an immediate ceasefire to the Gaza war. In November, Prime Minister Jonas Gahr Støre rejected the Israel's war in Gaza and stated that it violated international laws of war, affirming the Palestinians' right to self-defense.

On 16 November 2023, the Norwegian Parliament, the Storting, approved a resolution that calls on the government to be ready to recognise Palestine as an independent state. On 23 December, Støre strongly criticized Israel's warfare. He added that the Gaza Strip is now virtually without any hospital, "This means that more than 2 million people who have an urgent need for medical assistance are in a critical situation, which we cannot accept." And it risks losing any solidarity as a result of the October 7 attacks.

== Recognition ==
Amid the Gaza war, the government of Norway recognized the State of Palestine on 28 May 2024.

On 24 April 2025, Norway announced that it has formalized its diplomatic relations with Palestine when the newly appointed Palestinian ambassador to Norway, Marie Sedin, presented her credentials to King Harald V in a ceremonial event held at the Royal Palace in Oslo. Norway became the first European country to publicly announce that it would arrest Benjamin Netanyahu and Yoav Gallant if they entered the Nordic country.

== State visits ==
- 26 April 2006, by President Mahmoud Abbas.
- 18 September 2019, by President Mahmoud Abbas.
- 10 February 2026, by President Mahmoud Abbas.

== See also ==
- Foreign relations of Norway
- Foreign relations of Palestine
- Israel–Norway relations
