= Kalanit =

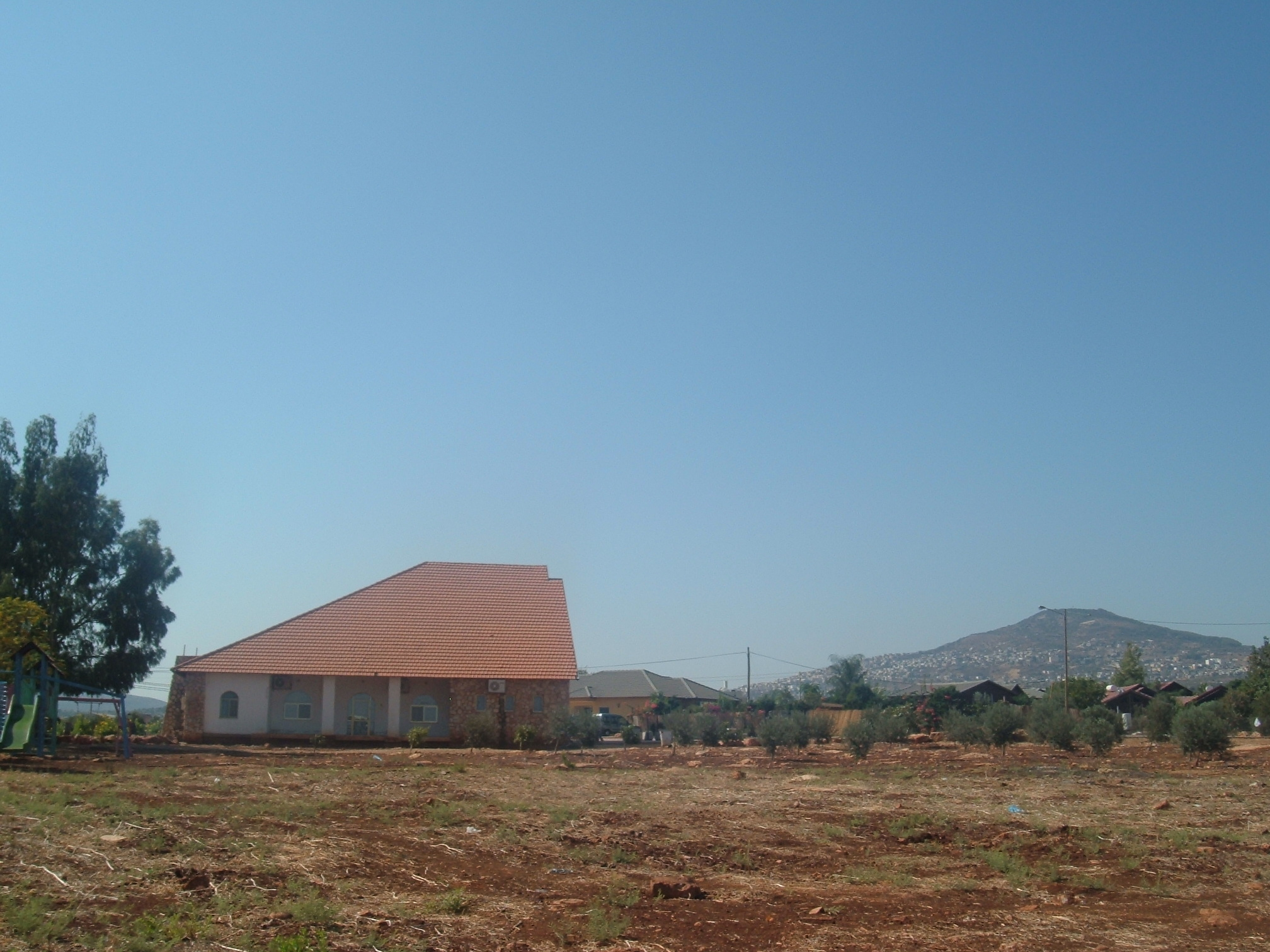
- Kalanit synagogue

- Location within Northeast Israel
- Coordinates: 32°52′26″N 35°27′18″E
- Country: Israel
- District: Northern
- Subdistrict: Safed
- Council: Merom HaGalil
- Affiliation: Hapoel HaMizrachi
- Founded: 1982
- Population (2024): 298

Kalanit (Hebrew: כַּלָּנִית, lit. Anemone) is a community settlement in northern Israel. Located between Tiberias and Karmiel, next to Maghar, it falls under the jurisdiction of Merom HaGalil Regional Council. In 2024 it had a population of 298.

== History ==
Kalanit was established in 1981 on land of the depopulated Palestinian village of Al-Mansura, southeast of the village site.

The village was established as a moshav by the Hapoel HaMizrachi organization with the goal that it would be populated by the children of the families living in the area, and so with time the moshav became a community settlement.

The community takes its name from a flower endemic to Israel, called in Modern Hebrew kalanit (Anemone coronaria).
