= Israel–Norway relations =

Bilateral relations between Israel and Norway

- Israel: Norway

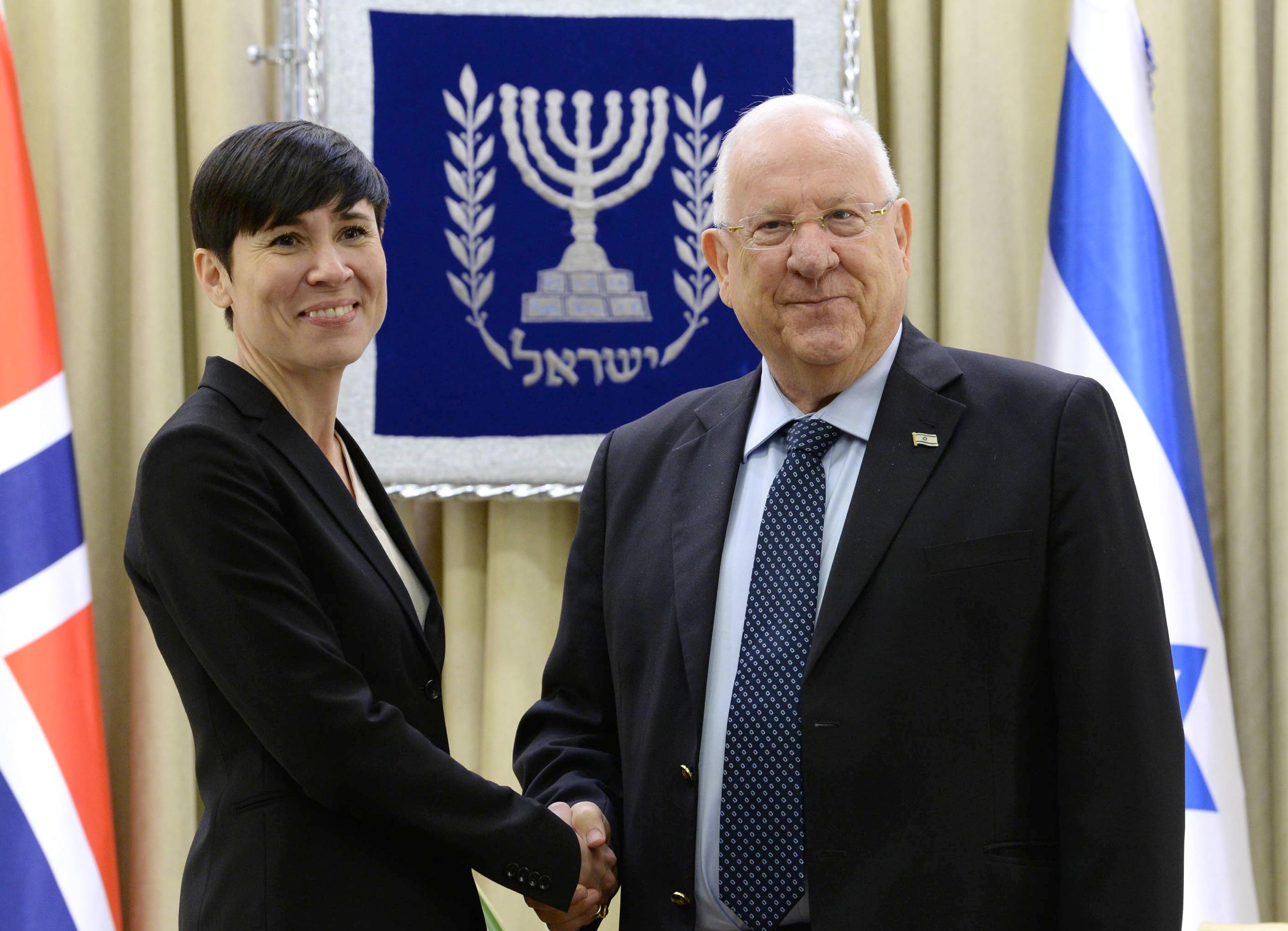
Norwegian Minister of Foreign Affairs Ine Marie Eriksen Søreide with Israeli President Reuven Rivlin, 2018

Israel–Norway relations are the bilateral relations between Israel and Norway. Norway was one of the first countries to recognize Israel, doing so on 4 February 1949. Both countries established diplomatic relations on 19 July 1950. Israel has an embassy in Oslo, and Norway has an embassy in Tel Aviv.

== History ==
On 11 May 1949, Norway was one of the U.N. members that voted in the General Assembly to admit Israel to the UN. Both countries established diplomatic relations on 19 July 1950.

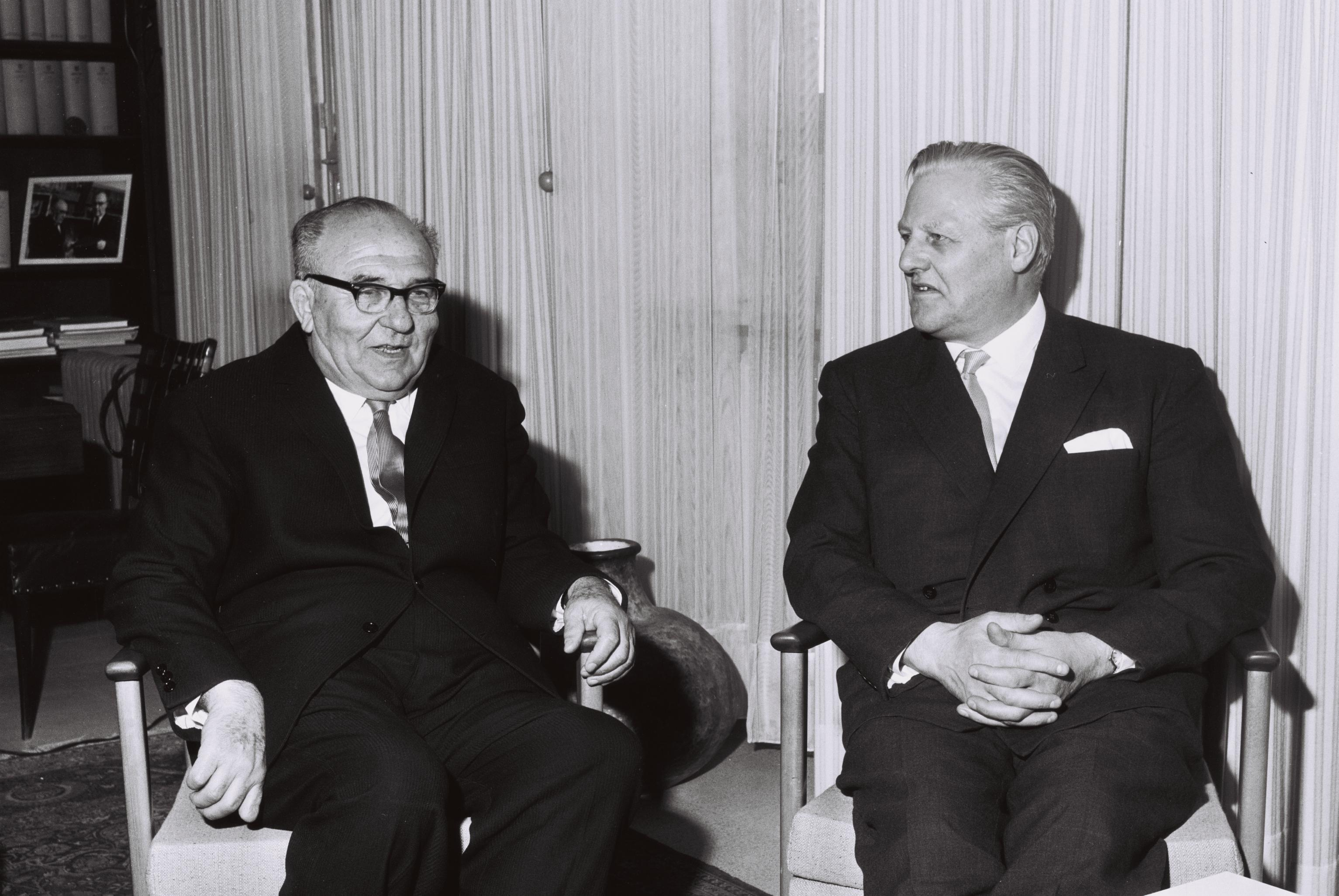
Prime Minister Levi Eshkol meeting with Foreign Minister John Lyng, 1967

Israel has an embassy in Oslo, which serves Norway and Iceland. Norway has an embassy in Tel Aviv and two honorary consulates, one in Eilat and the other in Haifa.

In 1981, a group of labour union members founded the organization Friends of Israel in the Norwegian Labour Movement (Norwegian: Venner av Israel i Norsk Arbeiderbevegelse). The purpose was to strengthen relations between Norwegian and Israeli labor movements in an informal and personal way. This was done by sending delegations to Israel, and by receiving visitors from Israel. Israel's ambassador to Oslo was an Israeli Druze poet and university lecturer, Naim Araidi. His deputy was George Deek, a Christian Arab from Jaffa.

Norway provided the facilities in 1993 to Israel and the Palestinian Liberation Organisation (PLO) that culminated in the Oslo Accords. In March 2007, the Norwegian government recognized the Hamas-led 2007 Palestinian unity government but called on the Palestinian authorities to renounce violence and recognize Israel's right to exist. The unity government failed to win international support because it did not meet the conditions set by the Quartet. Israel said it would not deal with the new Palestinian government unless it recognised Israel, which it refused to do.

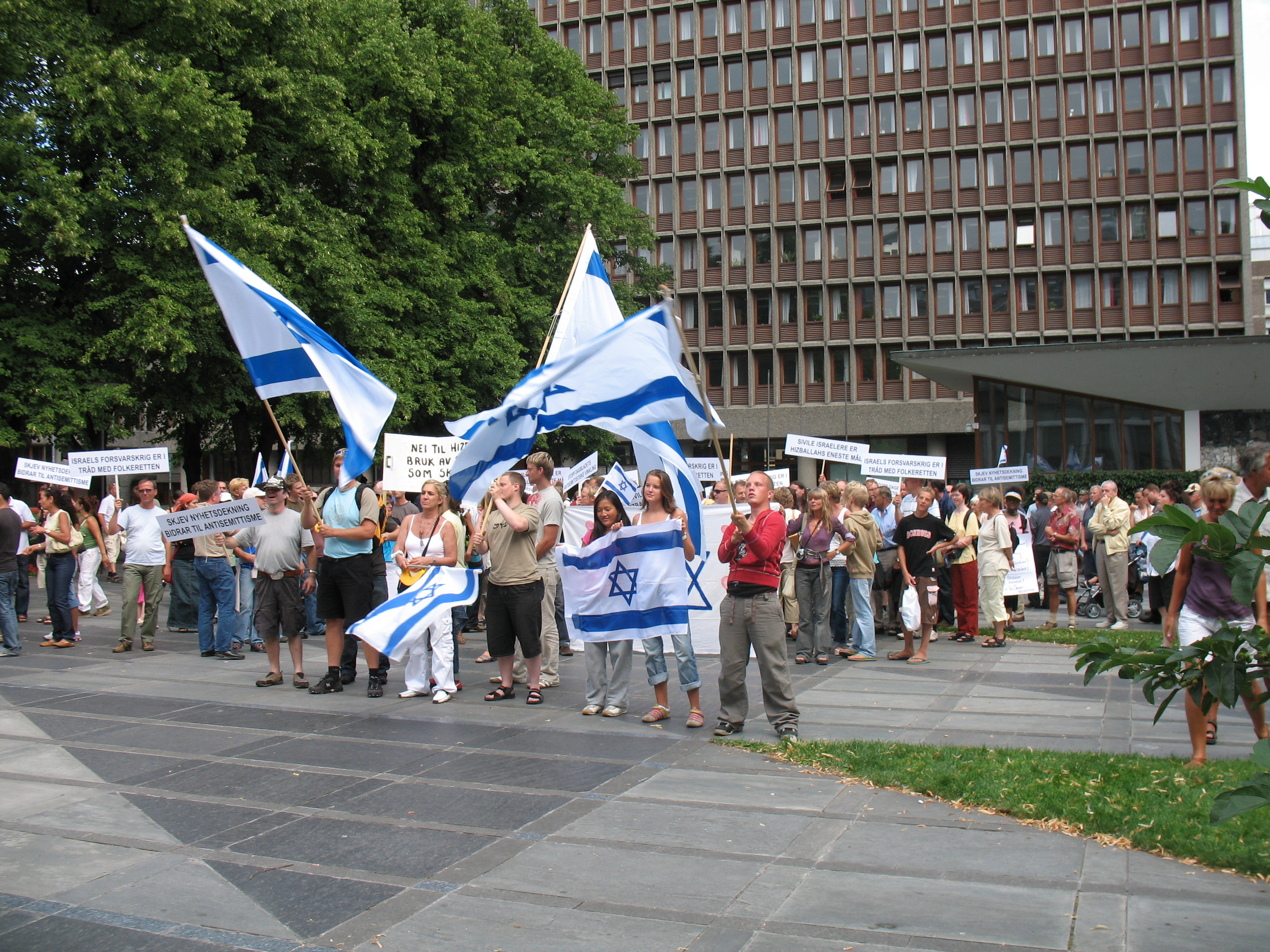
With Israel for Peace (MIFF) in Oslo

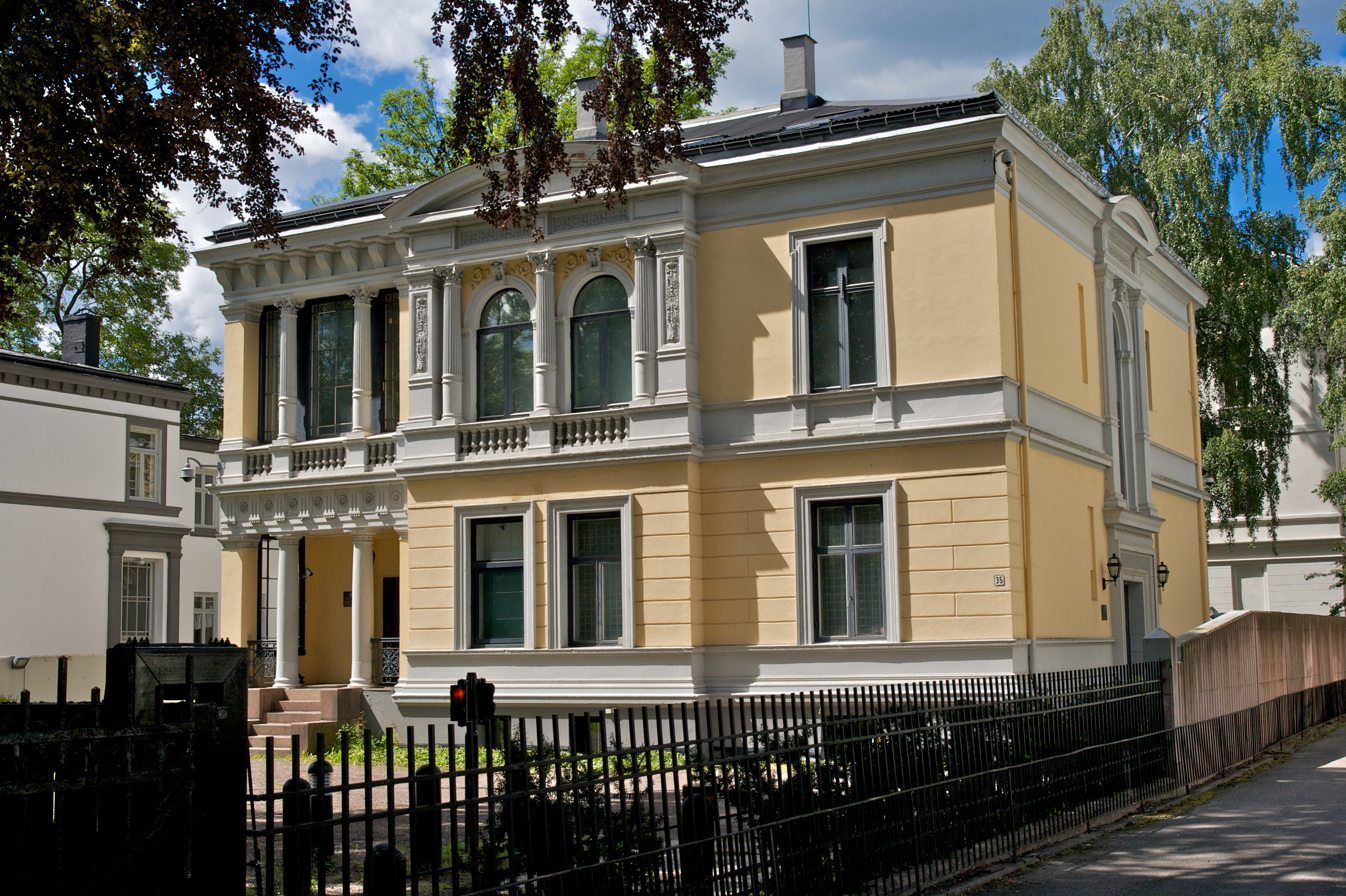
The Israeli Embassy in Oslo

In 2010, the Norwegian Foreign Ministry said "Norway considers the Israeli presence in East Jerusalem to be in violation of international law, as does the entire international community." George Deek became chargé d'affaires at the embassy until the new ambassador Rafael Schultz started his mission in the summer of 2014.

On 22 May 2024, Israel's Foreign Minister, Israel Katz, announced the recall of the Israeli Ambassador, Avi Nir Feldklein, following the Norwegian government's intention to recognize the State of Palestine on 28 May 2024. On 8 August 2024, Katz announced further sanctions and revoked the diplomatic status of Norwegian officials who were posted to serve in Norway's representative office to the PA.

In February 2025, Israeli Defense Minister Israel Katz suggested that some Palestinians from Gaza should immigrate to Norway.

On 19 June 2025, a grenade was thrown at the residence of the Norwegian ambassador to Israel in Tel Aviv without injuring anyone.

On 17 December 2025, Israel Foreign Minister Gideon Sa'ar is mulling closing embassy in Oslo following the Norwegian government's continued hostility towards the state of Israel. Citing the recognition of a Palestinian state, divestments and sanctions on Israeli ministers among the reasons.

In September 2026, Norway proposed banning trade with Israeli settlements in the occupied Palestinian territories, with up to three years in prison for violations. This bill covers 14 settlements in East Jerusalem and 265 settlements in the West Bank. and it will be voted on after the consultation ends on September 19. The Israeli embassy in Oslo called this proposal an anti-Israel move.

== Military ties ==
In 2007, 24 Norwegian Jews were registered as working for the Israeli military.

In September 2010, after Germany began testing two new Dolphin class submarines for the Israeli Navy, Norway banned them from testing in its territorial waters, due to their possible future role in enforcing the Blockade of the Gaza Strip.

== Resident diplomatic missions ==
- Israel has an embassy in Oslo.
- Norway has an embassy in Tel Aviv.

== See also ==
- Foreign relations of Israel
- Foreign relations of Norway
- Norway–Palestine relations
- Israels Venner på Stortinget (Friends of Israel in the Parliament of Norway)
- International recognition of Israel
- History of the Jews in Norway
- 2009 Oslo riots
- Lillehammer affair
