= Ghuwayr Abu Shusha =

Ghuwayr Abu Shusha غُويّر أبو شوشة
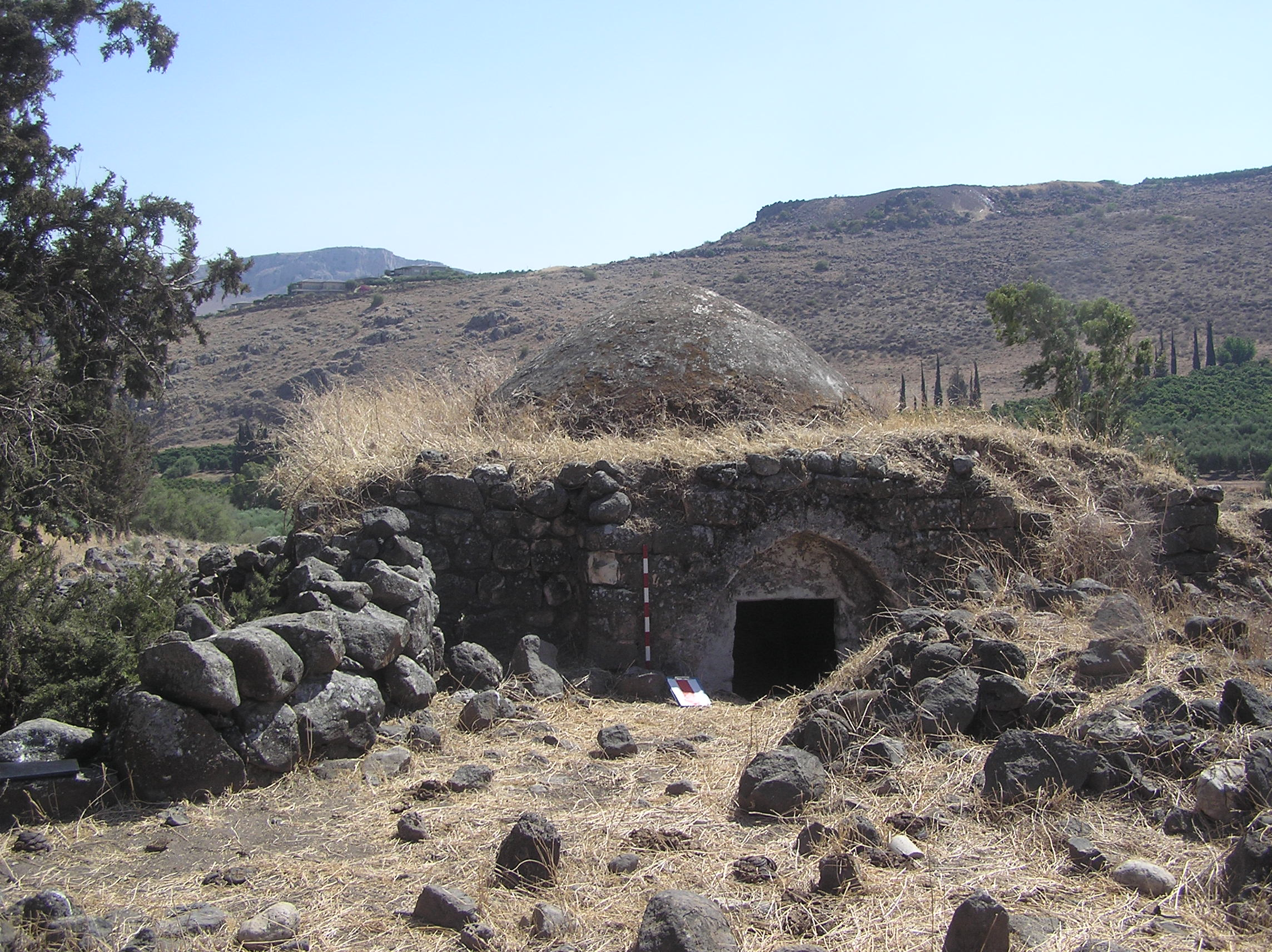
- Maqam Sheikh Abu Shusha
- Etymology: from personal name; meaning the “father of” wearing “a top knot”
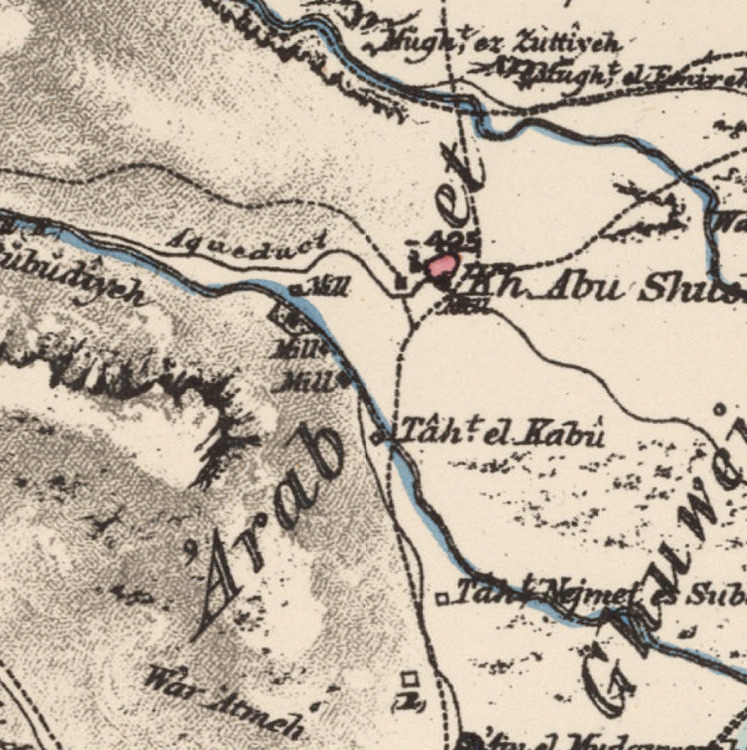
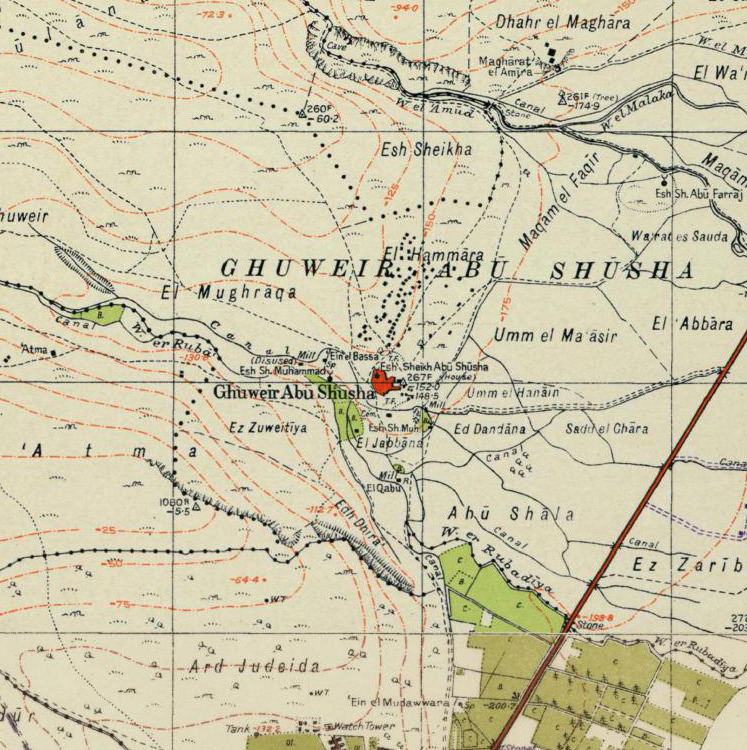
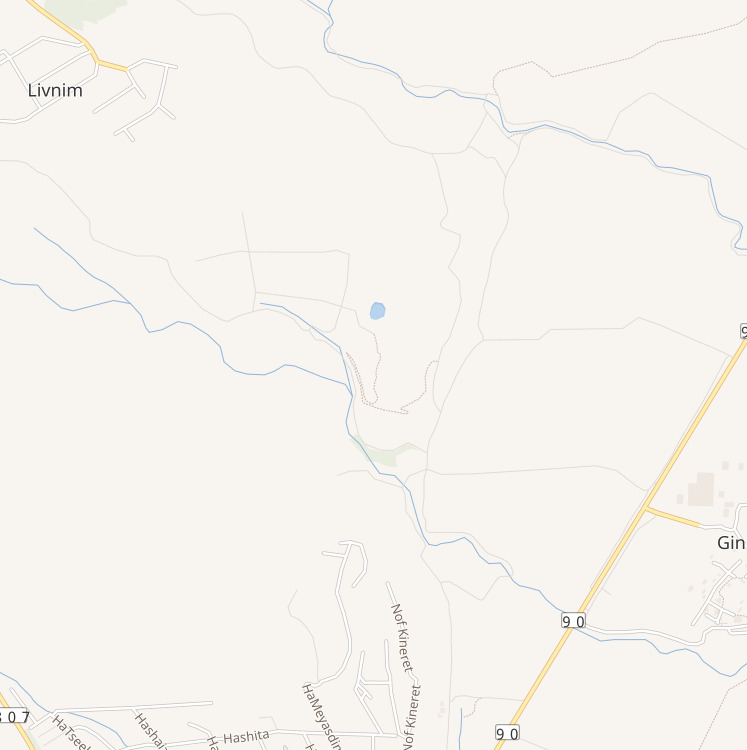
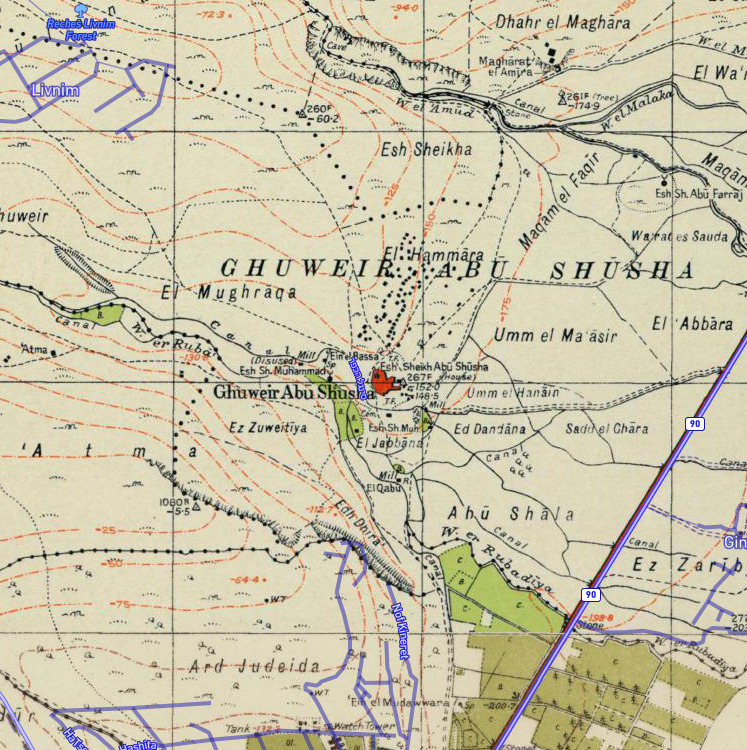
- 1870s map 1940s map modern map 1940s with modern overlay map A series of historical maps of the area around Ghuwayr Abu Shusha (click the buttons)

- Location within Mandatory Palestine
- Coordinates: 32°51′13″N 35°30′26″E
- Palestine grid: 197/251
- Geopolitical entity: Mandatory Palestine
- Subdistrict: Tiberias
- Date of depopulation: 21 and 28 April 1948

Area
  - Total: 8,609 dunams (8.609 km^{2}; 3.324 sq mi)

Population (1945)
  - Total: 1,240
- Cause(s) of depopulation: Military assault by Yishuv forces
- Secondary cause: Influence of nearby town's fall
- Current Localities: Ginosar, Livnim

Ghuwayr Abu Shusha was a Palestinian Arab village in the Tiberias Subdistrict. It was depopulated during the 1947–1948 Civil War in Mandatory Palestine on April 21, 1948. It was located 8 km north of Tiberias, nearby Wadi Rubadiyya.

== History ==
In 1838 Edward Robinson found on the remains of a few dwellings, built of rough volcanic stones, some of which were still used as magazines by the Arabs of the plain. A wely with a white dome marked the spot. He found no traces of antiquity.

In 1850-1851 de Saulcy saw the village, which he described as ruined. Of the village, all which remained was a few portions of wall of modern appearance, "but in the midst of these is still standing a square vaulted tower, constructed in fine blocks of Herodian workmanship, or Roman of the early empire. This tower rests against a wall of more recent character."

In 1875 Victor Guérin visited and noted the little wely dedicated to Abou-Choutheh.

In 1881, the PEF's Survey of Western Palestine (SWP) described it as containing 20 Moslems, with housed built of basalt, located round a mill. There were modern ruins in the village, and a number of ruined mills in the valley below.

=== British mandate era ===
In the 1945 statistics it had a population of 1,240 Muslims, with 8,609 dunams of land. Of this, 21 dunams were used for citrus and bananas, 1,377 for plantations and irrigable land, 1,848 dunams for cereals, while 6 dunams were classified as built-up (urban) area.

Ruins of watermills could be seen at the nearby Khirbat Abu Shusha.

=== 1948, and aftermath ===
The village was depopulated after a military assault on 21 and 28 April 1948.

Kibbutz Ginosar presently occupies part of what was village land; so does Livnim, established in 1982 ca. 1 km northwest of the Ghuwayr Abu Shusha site.

In 1992 the village site was described: "The village site is covered with thorns and wild vegetation, including Christ's-thorn trees and cactuses. The shrine of Shaykh Muhammad and the remains of a mill can be seen among piles of stones and a few olive trees. The lower-lying lands are planted in bananas and citrus, while the highlands are used as grazing areas by the Israelis."

== Gallery ==
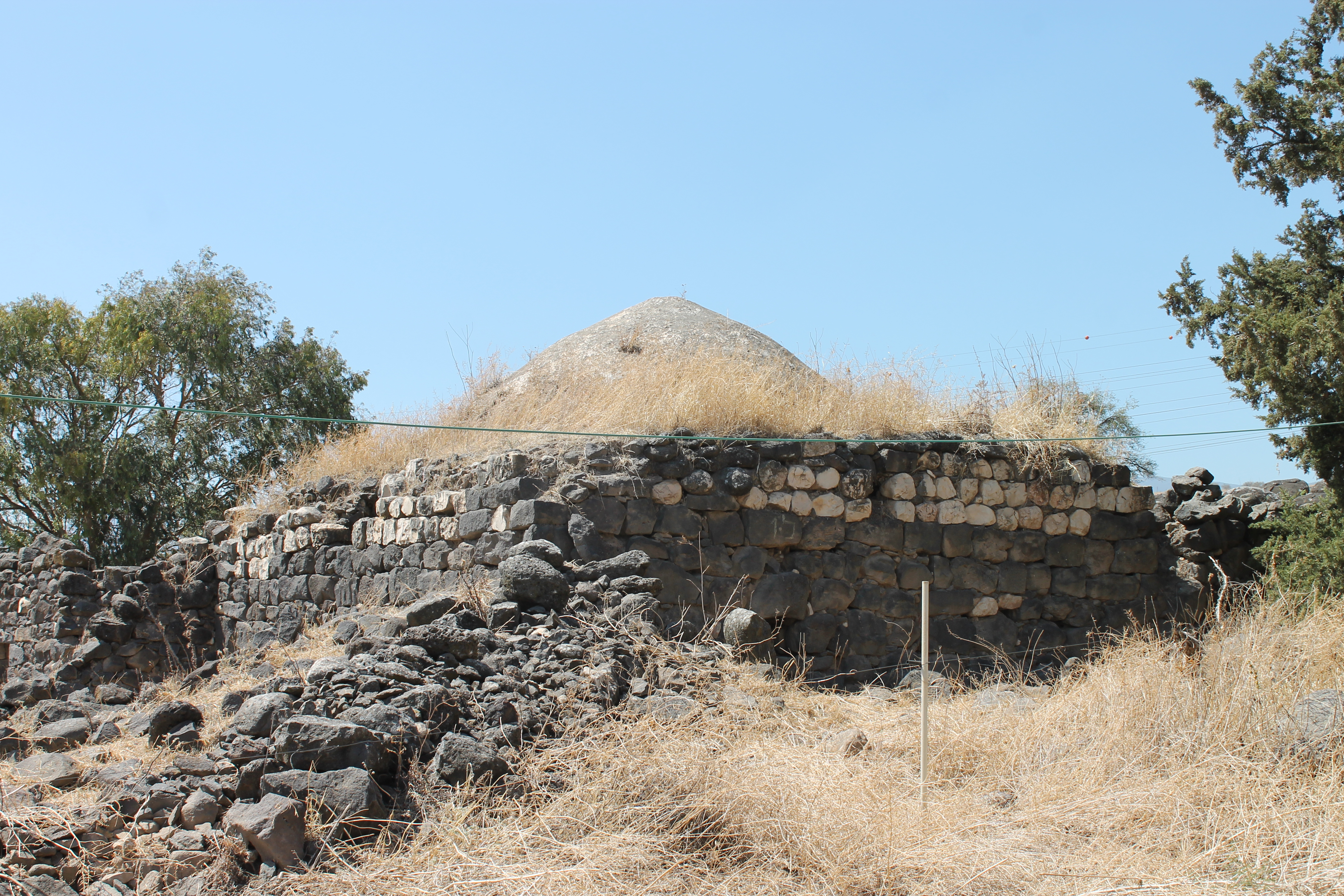
Maqam sheikh Abu Shusha, 2015

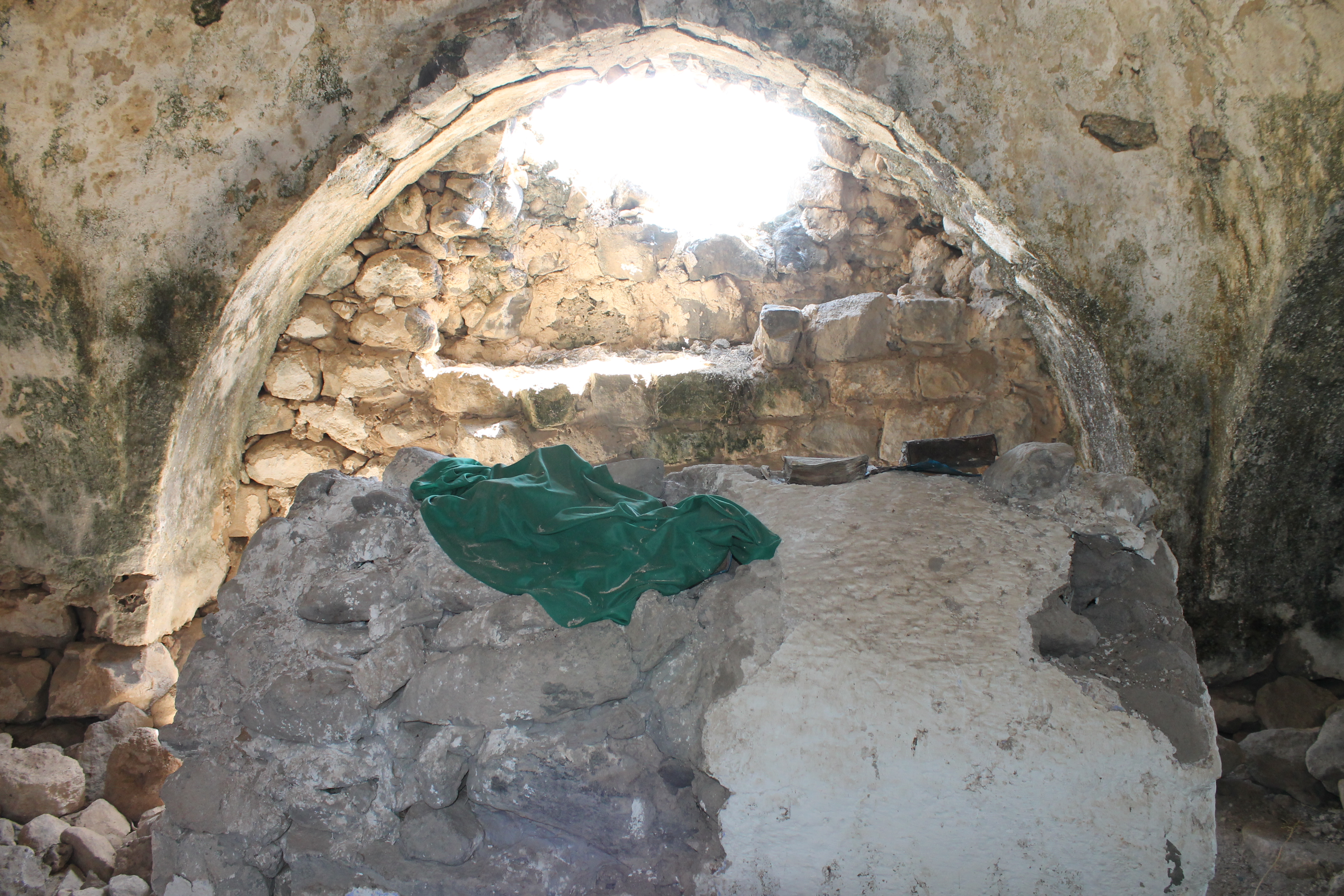
Maqam sheikh Abu Shusha, 2015

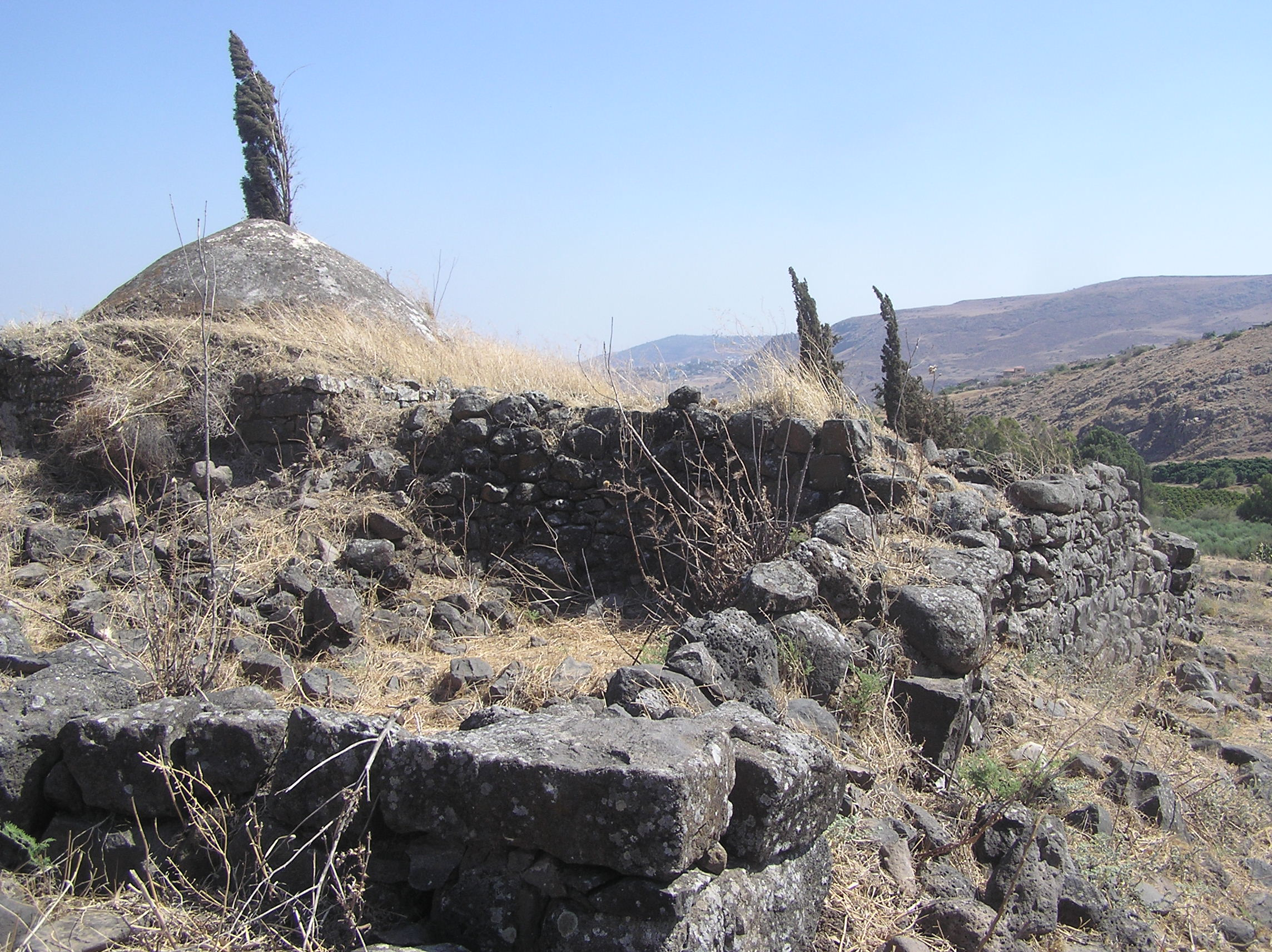
Maqam sheikh Abu Shusha, 2015

== Bibliography ==
- Conder, C.R.; Kitchener, H.H. (1881). The Survey of Western Palestine: Memoirs of the Topography, Orography, Hydrography, and Archaeology. Vol. 1. London: Committee of the Palestine Exploration Fund.
- Department of Statistics (1945). Village Statistics, April, 1945. Government of Palestine.
- Guérin, V. (1880). Description Géographique Historique et Archéologique de la Palestine (in French). Vol. 3: Galilee, pt. 1. Paris: L'Imprimerie Nationale.
- Hadawi, S. (1970). Village Statistics of 1945: A Classification of Land and Area ownership in Palestine. Palestine Liberation Organization Research Center.
- Khalidi, W. (1992). All That Remains: The Palestinian Villages Occupied and Depopulated by Israel in 1948. Washington D.C.: Institute for Palestine Studies. ISBN 0-88728-224-5.
- Morris, B. (2004). The Birth of the Palestinian Refugee Problem Revisited. Cambridge University Press. ISBN 978-0-521-00967-6.
- Palmer, E.H. (1881). The Survey of Western Palestine: Arabic and English Name Lists Collected During the Survey by Lieutenants Conder and Kitchener, R. E. Transliterated and Explained by E.H. Palmer. Committee of the Palestine Exploration Fund.
- Robinson, E.; Smith, E. (1841). Biblical Researches in Palestine, Mount Sinai and Arabia Petraea: A Journal of Travels in the year 1838. Vol. 3. Boston: Crocker & Brewster.
- Saulcy, L.F. de (1854). Narrative of a journey round the Dead Sea, and in the Bible lands, in 1850 and 1851. Vol. 2, new edition. London: R. Bentley.
