= Livnim =

Livnim: לִבְנִים, ליבנים (Hebrew)
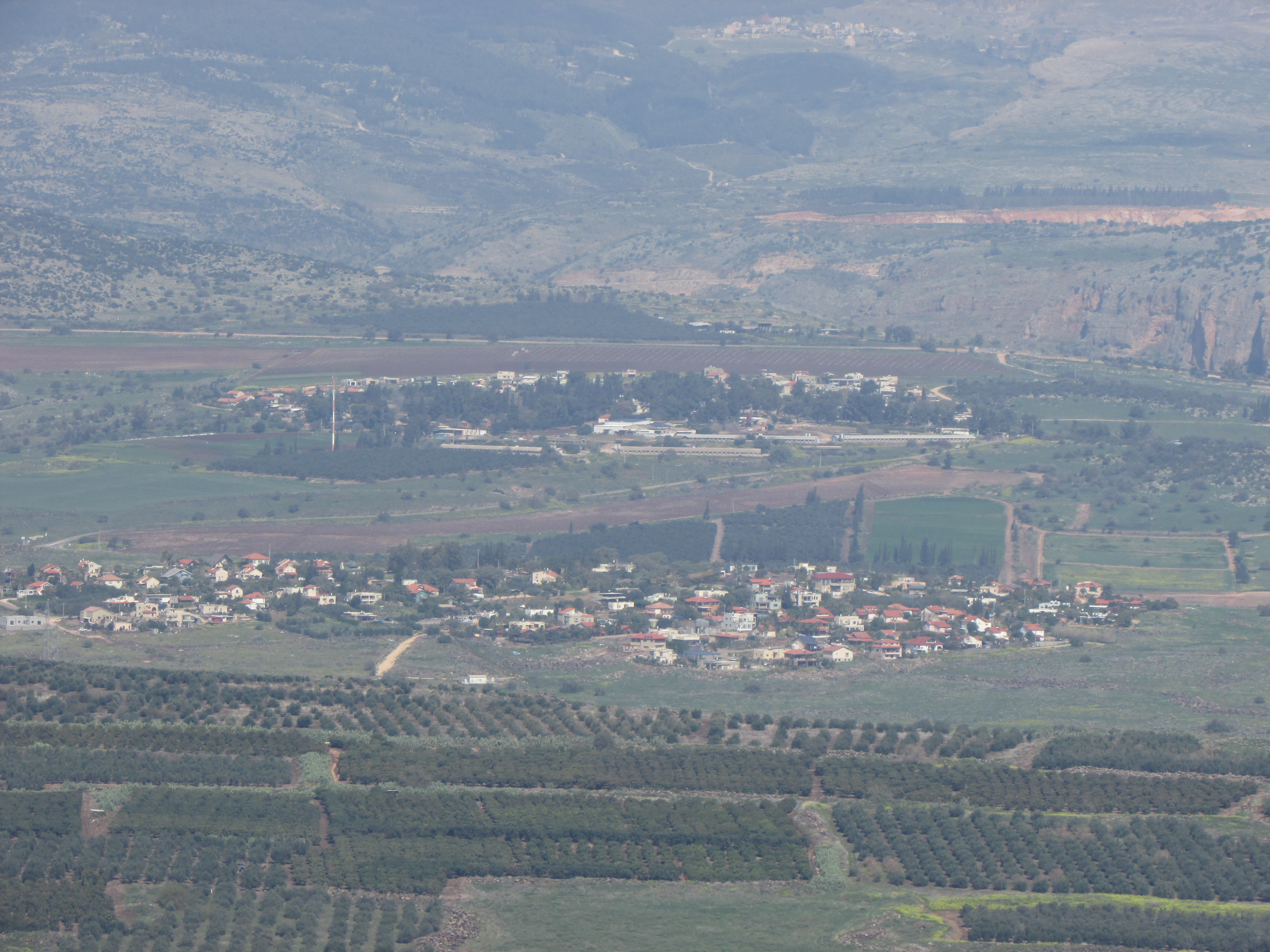
- Etymology: Birches
- Location within Northeast Israel Location within Israel
- Coordinates: 32°51′51″N 35°29′47″E
- Country: Israel
- District: Northern
- Subdistrict: Safed
- Council: Merom HaGalil
- Affiliation: Moshavim Movement
- Founded: 1982
- Population (2024): 516

Livnim (Hebrew: לִבְנִים, lit. Birches) is a community settlement in northern Israel. Located northwest of the Sea of Galilee in the western Ginosar Valley, it falls under the jurisdiction of Merom HaGalil Regional Council. In 2024 it had a population of 516.

== History ==
The community was founded in 1982 by members of nearby moshavim as a workers' moshav, on the lands of the depopulated Palestinian village of Ghuwayr Abu Shusha. In 1989 it became a community settlement. It is named after the plant "Livne" (Styrax officinalis), that grows in the area.
