= Hazon, Israel =

Moshav in northern Israel

Hazon: חָזוֹן (Hebrew)
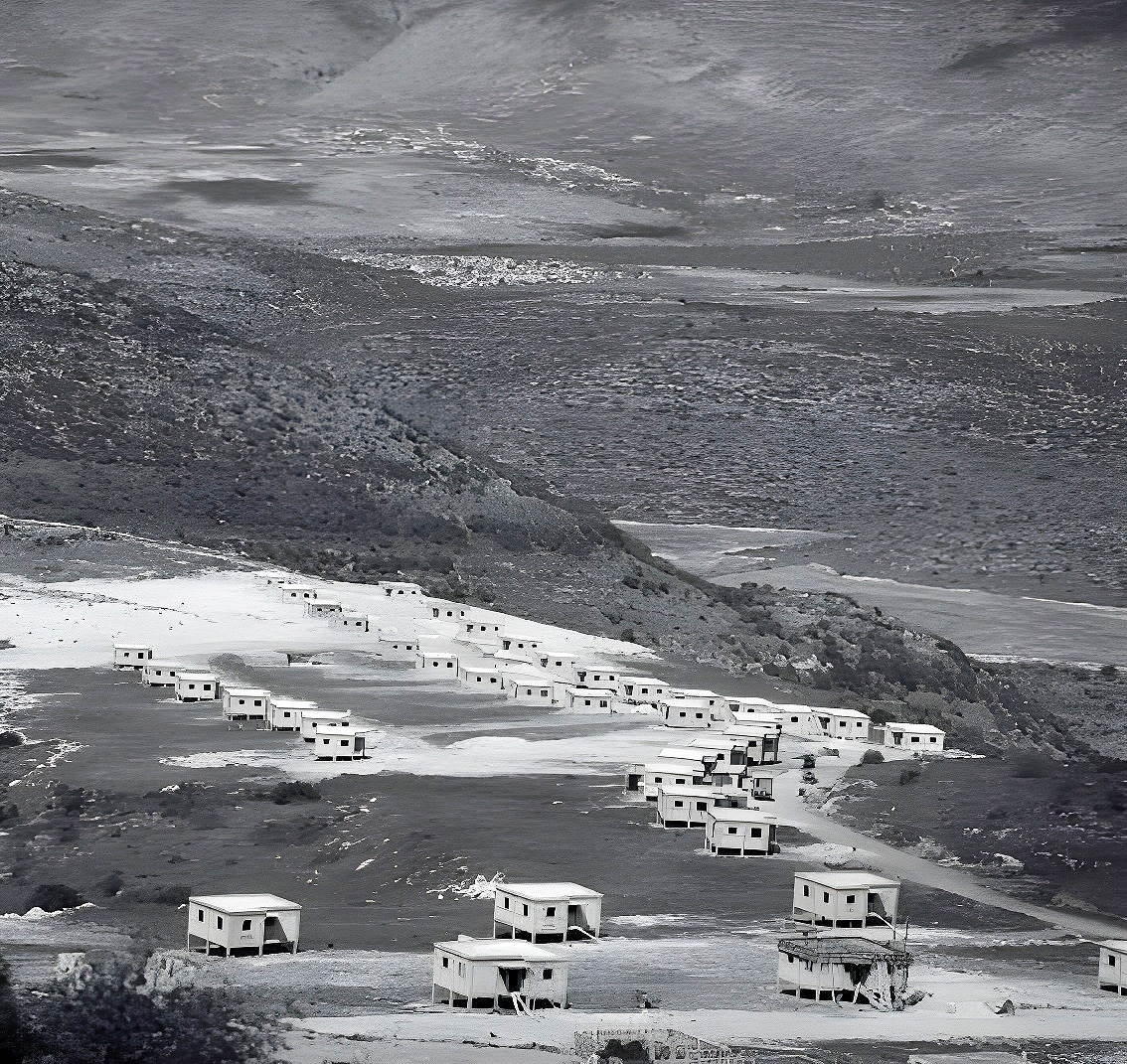
- Hazon upon its establishment

- Location within Northeast Israel Location within Israel
- Coordinates: 32°54′22″N 35°23′37″E
- Country: Israel
- District: Northern
- Council: Merom HaGalil
- Affiliation: Hapoel HaMizrachi
- Founded: 1969
- Founder: Moshavniks from Galilee
- Population (2024): 388
- Website: www.mizra.org.il

Hazon (Hebrew: חָזוֹן) is a moshav in the Upper Galilee in northern Israel. Located nine kilometers east of Carmiel, it falls under the jurisdiction of Merom HaGalil Regional Council. In 2024 it had a population of 388.

== History ==
The village was founded in 1969 by moshavniks from the Galilee, taking its name from the slopes of Mount Hazon, where it is located. It was established on the land of the depopulated Palestinian village of Al-Mansura.
