= Embassy of Israel, Oslo =

Israeli diplomatic mission in Norway

שגרירות ישראל באוסלו Embassy of Israel in Oslo
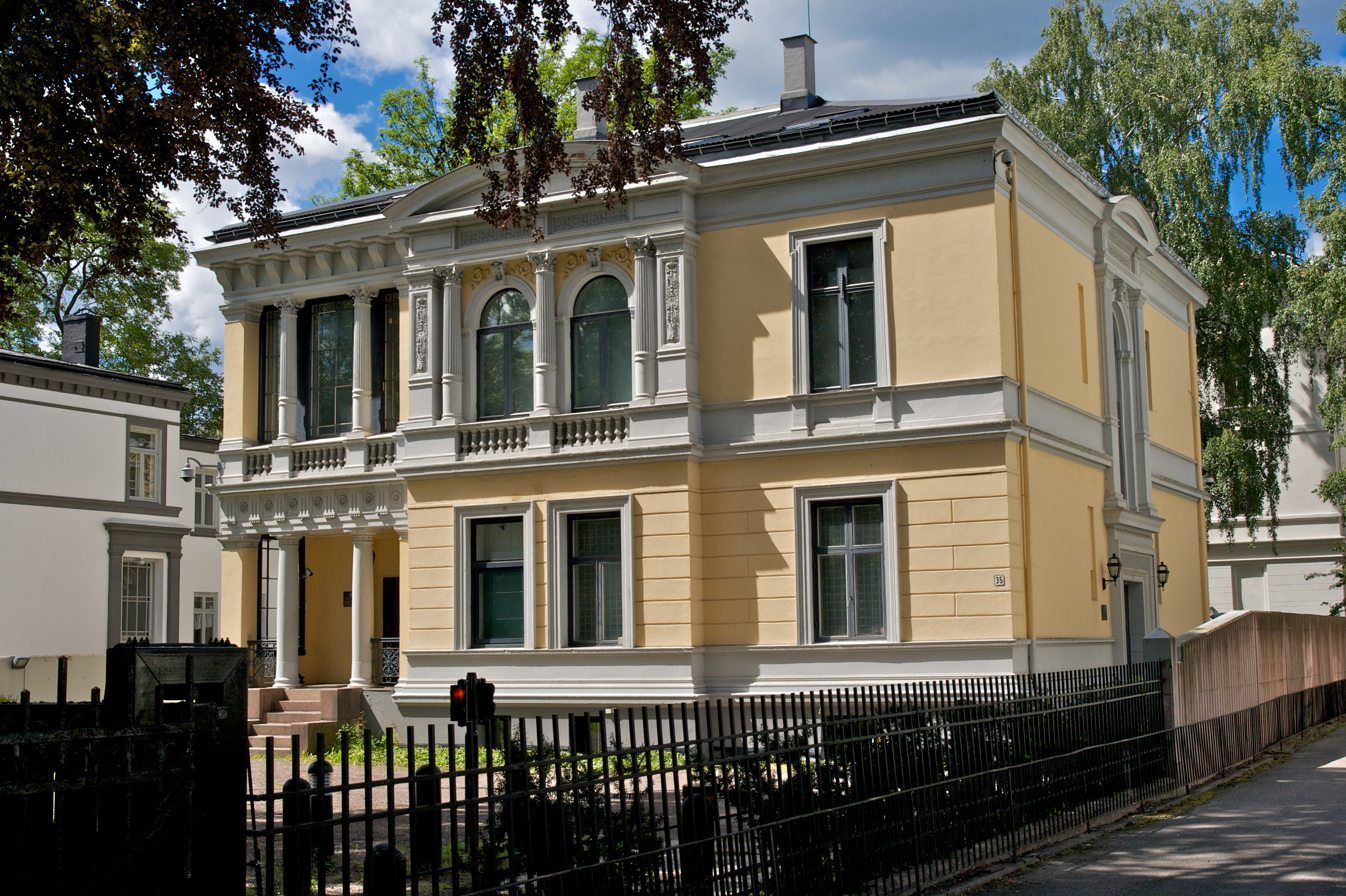
- Location: Parkveien 35, Oslo
- Address: Parkveien 35, 0258 Oslo, Norway
- Ambassador: None

The Embassy of Israel in Oslo is the diplomatic mission of Israel in Norway. The embassy also covers Iceland. The embassy building is located at Parkveien 35, behind the Royal Palace.

The embassy building dates from 1892 and is under the protection of the city antiquarian. The embassy was previously located in Drammensveien 82C and moved to its current premises in March 2000. Until 1960, the representation was through the Israeli embassy in Stockholm.

Avi Nir-Feldklein served as ambassador from 22 September 2022 to October 2024. He was recalled following Norway's recognition of Palestine on 28 May 2024.

The Lillehammer affair in 1973 resulted in the expulsion of a security attaché.
