= Maghar, Israel =

Maghar المغار (Arabic) מע'אר (Hebrew)
- City

Hebrew transcription(s)
  - Also spelled: Mughar (official); Mrar, Mghar (unofficial)
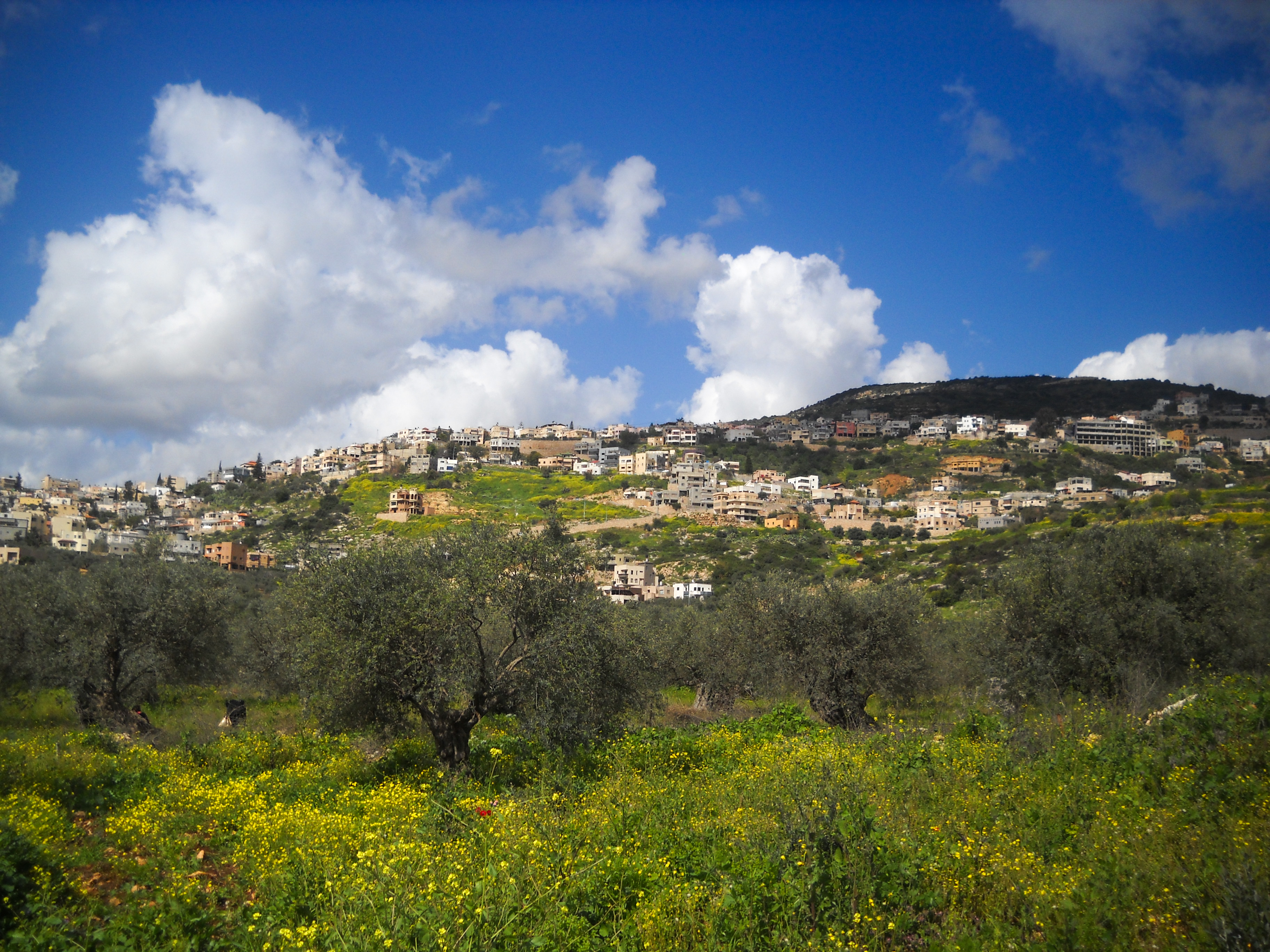
- View of Maghar

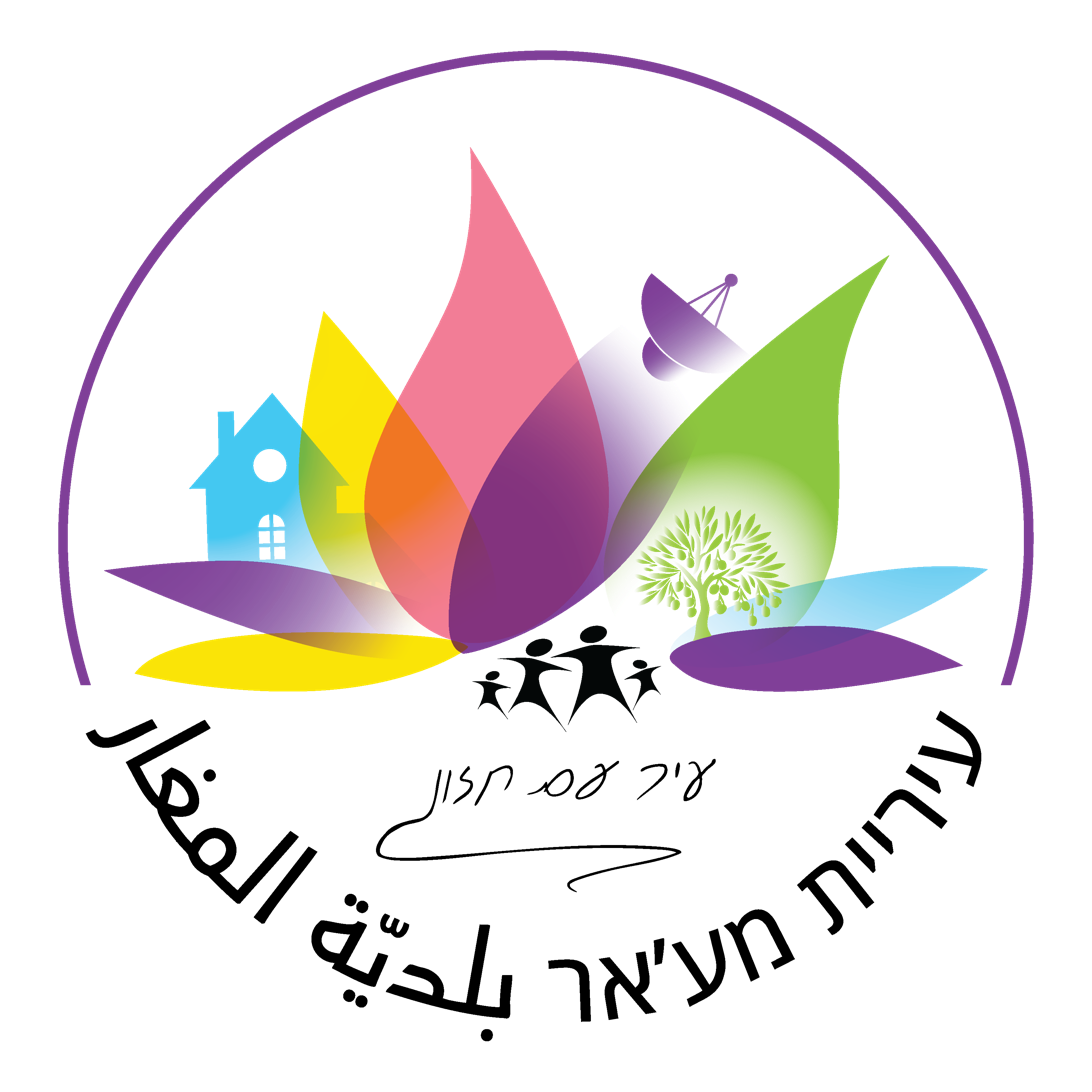
- Municipality logo

- Location within Northeast Israel Location within Israel
- Coordinates: 32°53′24″N 35°24′30″E
- Grid position: 188/255 PAL
- Country: Israel
- District: Northern
- Subdistrict: Kinneret
- Natural Region: Eastern Lower Galilee

Government
  - Type: Mayor–council
  - Body: Municipality of Maghar
  - Mayor: Taier Kizel

Area
  - Total: 27,364 dunams (27.364 km^{2}; 10.565 sq mi)

Population (2024)
  - Total: 23,486
  - Density: 858.28/km^{2} (2,222.9/sq mi)
- Time zone: UTC+2 (IST)
  - Summer (DST): UTC+3 (IDT)
- Name meaning: The Caves
- Website: www.al-maghar.co.il

Maghar (Arabic: المغار [(e)lmaˈɣaːr]; Hebrew: מע'אר) also al-Maghar or Mghar, is a city of mixed population of Muslims, Christians, and Druze in the Northern District of Israel, with an area of 19,810 dunams. Maghar was given the status of a local council in 1956, and of a city in 2021. In 2024 it had a population of 23,486. Its population consists of 56.9% Druze, 21.8% Muslims, and 21.3% Christians.

== History ==
=== Antiquity ===
Maghar is identified with Mearaia (Hebrew: מעריה), a place mentioned in Jewish sources as the seat of the Bilgah priestly family following the destruction of the Temple in 70 CE.

Pottery remains from the early Roman period have been found here, together with architectural remains and pottery fragments from the Late Roman period. A quarry has also been excavated.

The city's name comes from the Arabic word for "the caves".

=== Ottoman Empire ===
The village was incorporated into the Ottoman Empire in 1517 with all of Palestine, and in 1555 a tax was paid on silk spinning. In 1596 the village appeared in the tax registers as Magar Hazur, located in the nahiya of Tabariyya, part of Sanjak Safad with an entirely Muslim population consisting of 169 households and 17 bachelors. The villagers paid a fixed tax rate of 25% on various agricultural products, including wheat, barley, olive trees, goats and/or beehives, in addition on a press for olives or grapes, a total of 14,136 akçe.

In 1838, el Mughar was noted as a Christian and Druze village in the Esh-Shagur district, located between Safad, Acca and Tiberias.

In 1875 Victor Guérin found the village, which he called el-Mehar, to be a large one with 1200 inhabitants. It was divided into three-quarters, with Muslim, Christian and Druse inhabitants. In 1881, the Palestine Exploration Fund's Survey of Western Palestine described El Mughar as a "large stone-built village, containing about 1,100 Moslems, Druses, and Christians, situated on the slope of the hill, with extensive olive-groves to the south and west; a large spring and birkeh gives a good supply of water."

A population list from about 1887 showed El Mughar el Hazzur to have about 1,360 inhabitants; 180 Muslims, 625 Druze and 420 Catholic Christians.

=== British Mandate ===
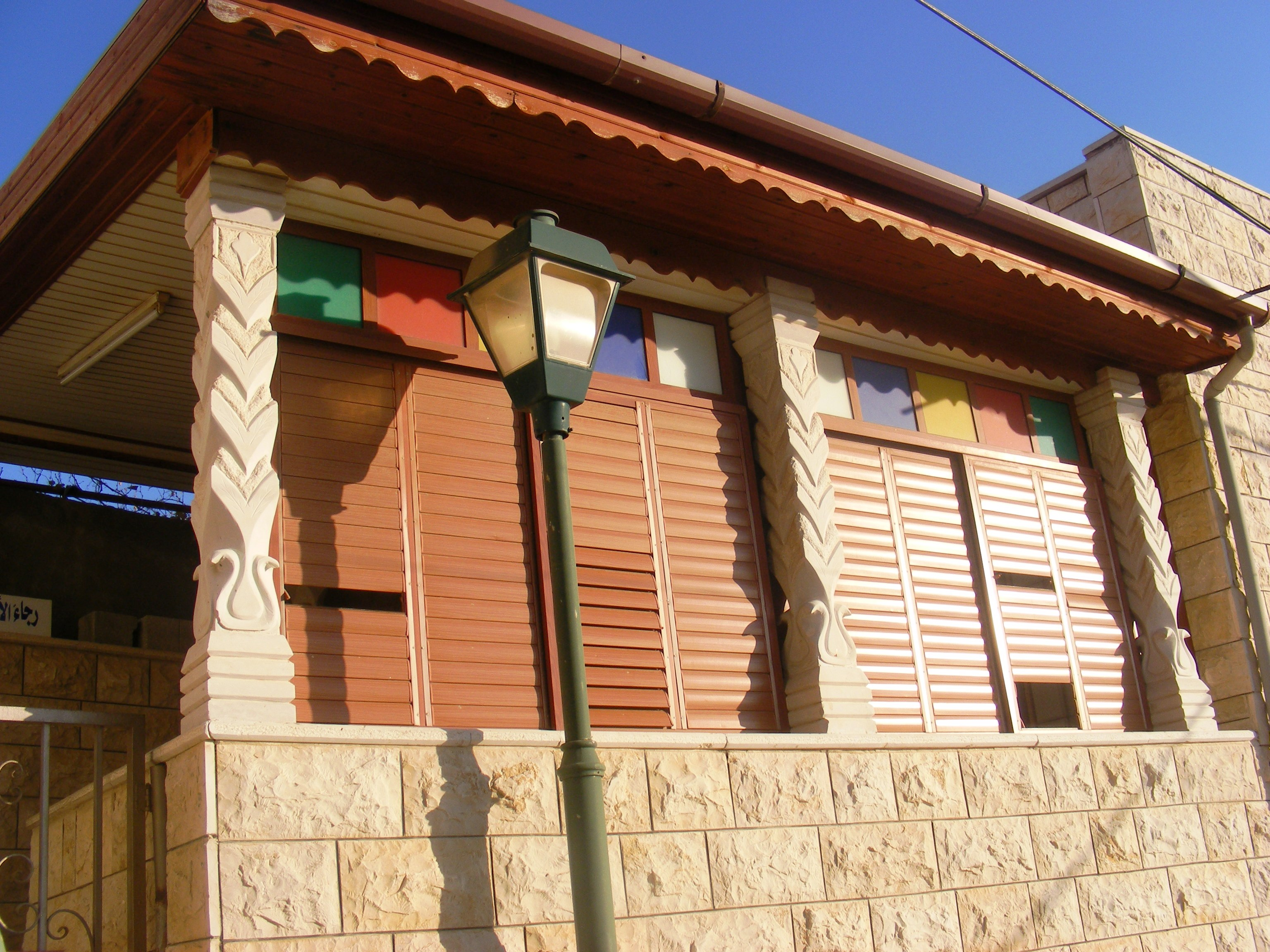
Druze khalwa in Maghar

In the 1922 census of Palestine, conducted by the British Mandate authorities, Mughar wa Mansura had a total population of 1377. Of these, 265 were Muslim, 676 Druze and 436 Christians. All the Christians were Roman Catholic. In the 1931 census the population of Maghar, together with Al-Mansura, was a total of 1733, in 373 inhabited houses. Of these, 307 were Muslim, 549 Christians, and 877 Druze.

In the 1945 statistics the population of Maghar, together with Al-Mansura, was 2,140; 90 Muslims, 800 Christians and 1,250 others. who owned 55,583 dunams of land according to an official land and population survey. 7,864 dunams were plantations and irrigable land, 18,352 for cereals, while 55 dunams were built-up (urban) land.

=== Israel ===
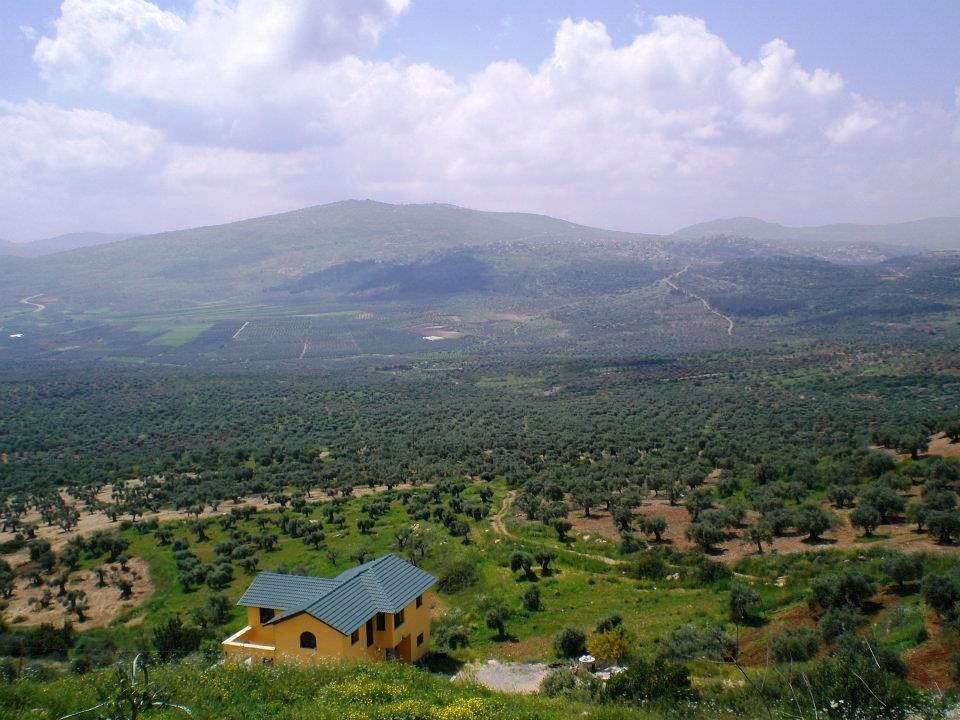
Olive groves in Maghar

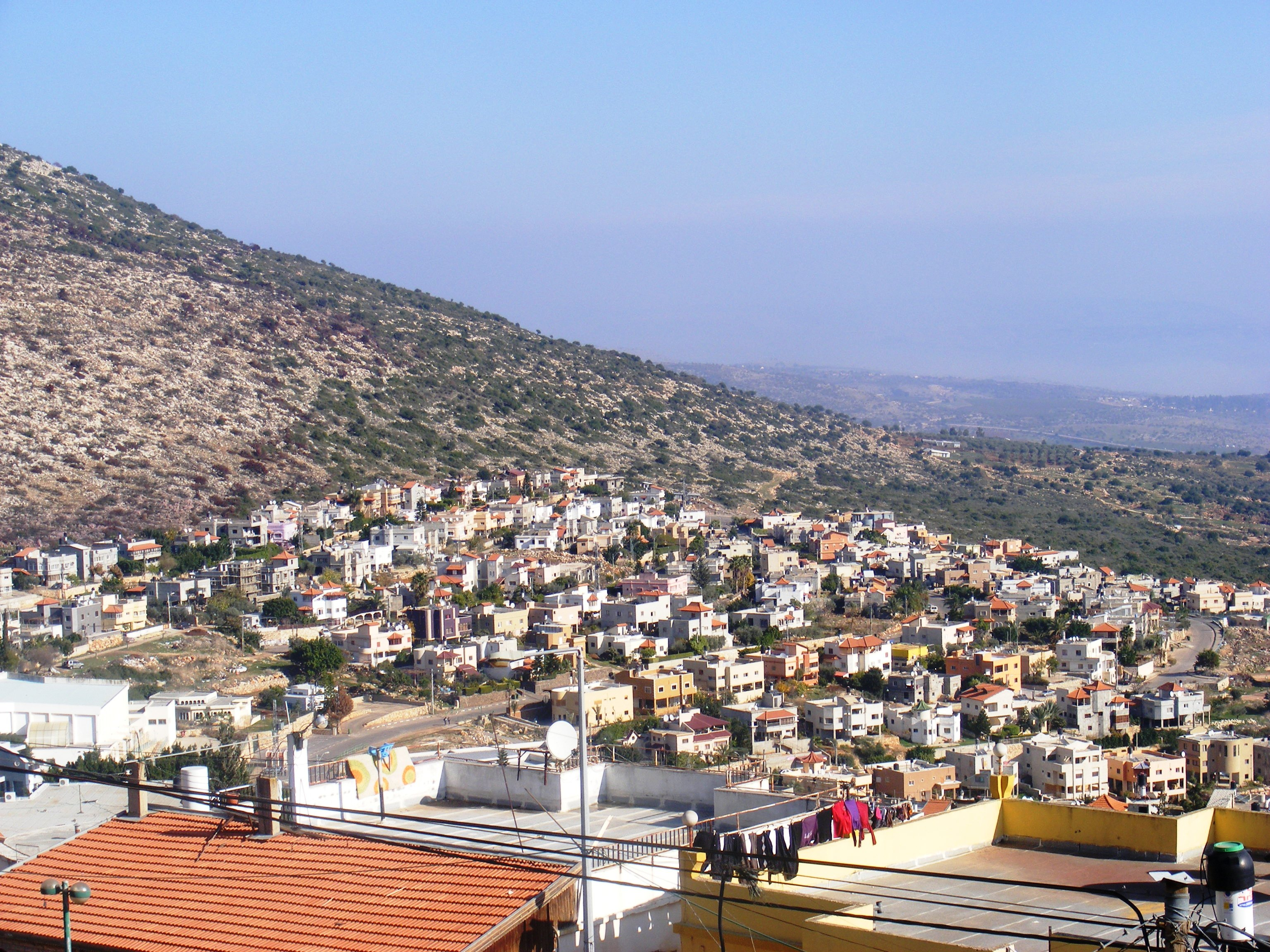
Druze neighborhood in Maghar

==== 20th century ====
During Operation Hiram, October 29–31, 1948, the town surrendered to the advancing Israeli army. Many of the inhabitants fled north but some stayed and were not expelled by the Israeli soldiers. The town remained under Martial Law until 1966.

==== 21st century ====
In August 2003 the Israel Circus School established a joint Jewish-Arab "Children’s Circus" together with its partner, Circus Maghar. A group of 20 Jewish and Arab children trained for the circus. In addition to local performances, the circus school toured Cyprus, giving workshops and performances for Christian and Muslim schools and community centers.

In 2005 Druze attacked Christians after rumors spread that some Christian youths created photo images of Druze girls as nude models and posted them on the internet. Christian shops, vehicle, house and the church were vandalized. The clashes forced around 2,000 of the Christians to flee their homes. According to Jack Khoury this clash may be a result of animosity between the wealthier Christian population and the poorer Druze. According to the police investigation, it turns out that a Druze youth had spread lie to his friends about the pictures. Dan Ronen the commander of Northern District commander called the violence "a pogrom".

During the 2006 Israel–Lebanon conflict two residents of Maghar were killed and several wounded in Hezbollah rocket and cluster bomb attacks. On July 25, Doua Abbas, 15, was killed by a rocket that hit her house. On August 4, Manal Azzam, a 27-year-old mother of two, was killed, and two other residents were seriously wounded when a rocket hit their apartment building.

Following a Facebook post supporting the 2017 Temple Mount shooting by a Muslim resident of Maghar, the hometown of one of the Druze victims, two mosques in the village were attacked in two separate incidents on the nights of July 14 and 16 with stun grenades and gunfire resulting in minor property damage. Israeli Police were on the scene of the attacks within minutes, where they gathered evidence and opened an investigation.

== Demographics ==
Historical population
Year	Pop.	±%
1972	6,600	—
1983	10,700	+62.1%
1995	15,200	+42.1%
2008	19,600	+28.9%
2022	22,564	+15.1%
2024	23,486	+4.1%

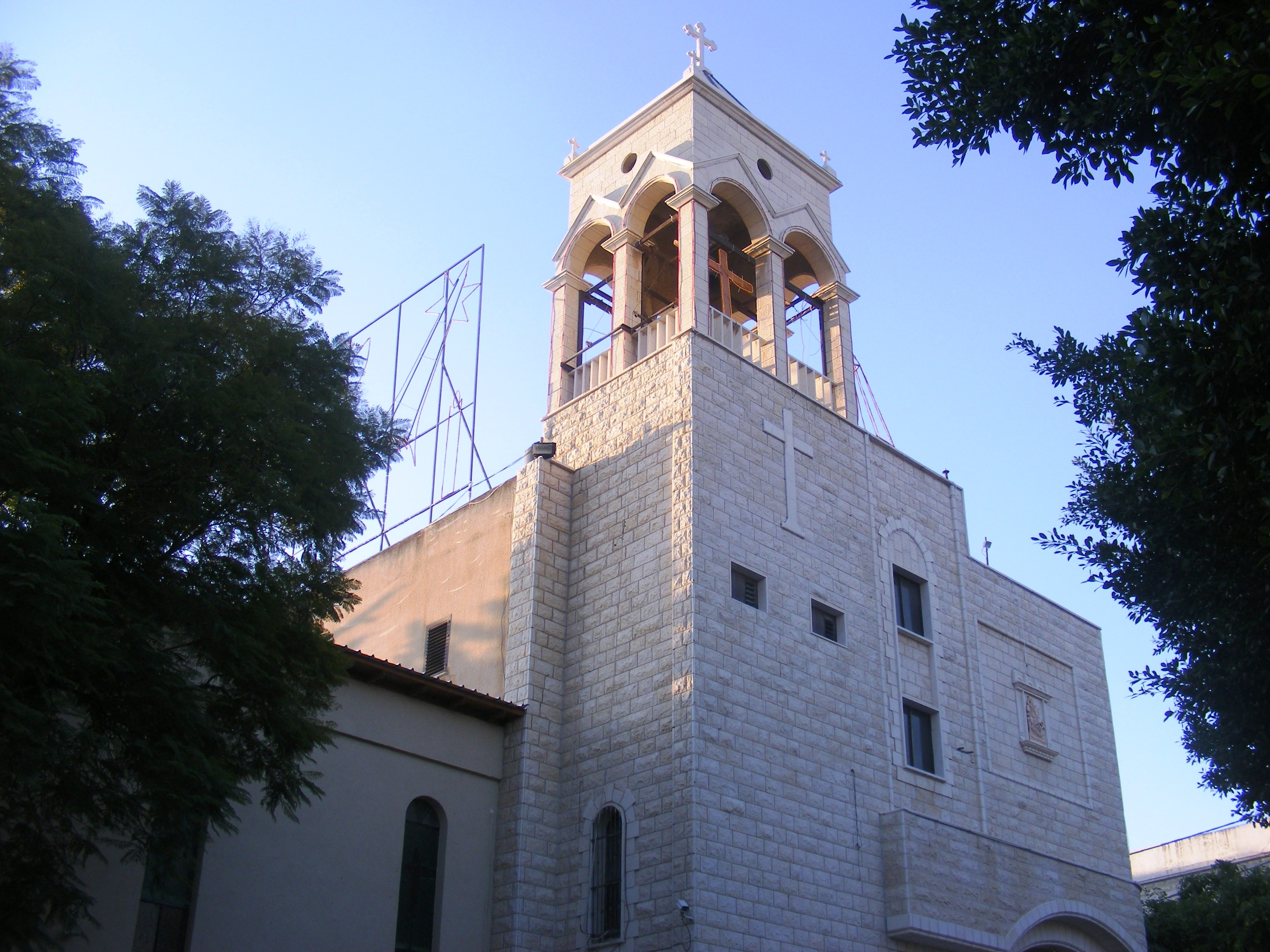
Melkite Greek Catholic Church in Maghar

Most residents are Druze (57.9%), with Arab Christians (21%) and Muslim (21.1%) minorities. Many of the Druze residents serve in the IDF and Israel Police. The Christian population is mostly Melkite Catholic. In 2022, 56.9% of the population was Druze, 21.8% was Muslim and 21.3% was Christian.

== Voting Patterns ==
In the 2022 election, 50 percent of voters in Maghar voted for the Arab parties, while 36 percent voted for the parties of the center-left coalition led by Yair Lapid and 11 percent voted for the parties of the right-wing coalition led by Benjamin Netanyahu.

In the 2026 election, 43 percent of voters in Maghar voted for the parties of the center-left coalition led by Gadi Eisenkot, while 42 percent voted for the Arab parties and 13 percent voted for the parties of the right-wing coalition led by Benjamin Netanyahu. An additional 0.5 percent voted for the Reservists, and 0.4 percent voted for Amcha Yisrael. Voter turnout increased 57 percent from the 2022 election.

== Notable people ==
- Mansour Abbas (born 1974), politician
- Naim Araidi (1950–2015), professor of Hebrew literature at Haifa University and Bar Ilan University, was appointed Israel's ambassador to Norway in 2012
- Suliman Bashear (1947–1991), was a leading Druze Arab scholar and professor, who taught at Birzeit University, An-Najah National University, and the Hebrew University of Jerusalem. Bashear was noted for his work on the early historiography of Islam
- Ihab Khatib, soldier
- Salman Masalha, poet, writer, essayist and translator
- Daud Turki, a Palestinian-Arab poet and the leader of the Jewish-Arab socialist group called the Red Front

== See also ==
- Arab localities in Israel
- Druze in Israel

== Bibliography ==
- Barron, J.B., ed. (1923). Palestine: Report and General Abstracts of the Census of 1922. Government of Palestine.
- Braun, Eliot (June 9, 2004). "Maghar Archive Report- Final Report" (116). Hadashot Arkheologiyot – Excavations and Surveys in Israel.
- Conder, C.R.; Kitchener, H.H. (1881). The Survey of Western Palestine: Memoirs of the Topography, Orography, Hydrography, and Archaeology. Vol. 1. London: Committee of the Palestine Exploration Fund.
- Government of Palestine, Department of Statistics (1945). Village Statistics, April, 1945.
- Guérin, V. (1880). Description Géographique Historique et Archéologique de la Palestine (in French). Vol. 3: Galilee, pt. 1. Paris: L'Imprimerie Nationale.
- Hadawi, S. (1970). Village Statistics of 1945: A Classification of Land and Area ownership in Palestine. Palestine Liberation Organization Research Center.
- Hütteroth, W.-D.; Abdulfattah, K. (1977). Historical Geography of Palestine, Transjordan and Southern Syria in the Late 16th Century. Erlanger Geographische Arbeiten, Sonderband 5. Erlangen, Germany: Vorstand der Fränkischen Geographischen Gesellschaft. ISBN 3-920405-41-2.
- Jaffe, Gilad Bezal’el (February 28, 2010). "Maghar Final Report" (122). Hadashot Arkheologiyot – Excavations and Surveys in Israel.
- Jaffe, Gilad Bezal’el (October 9, 2011). "Maghar Final Report" (123). Hadashot Arkheologiyot – Excavations and Surveys in Israel.
- Mills, E., ed. (1932). Census of Palestine 1931. Population of Villages, Towns and Administrative Areas. Jerusalem: Government of Palestine.
- Morris, B. (1987). The Birth of the Palestinian Refugee Problem. Cambridge University Press. ISBN 0-521-33028-9.
- Palmer, E.H. (1881). The Survey of Western Palestine: Arabic and English Name Lists Collected During the Survey by Lieutenants Conder and Kitchener, R. E. Transliterated and Explained by E.H. Palmer. Committee of the Palestine Exploration Fund.
- Rhode, H. (1979). Administration and Population of the Sancak of Safed in the Sixteenth Century (PhD). Columbia University. Archived from the original on March 1, 2020.
- Robinson, E.; Smith, E. (1841). Biblical Researches in Palestine, Mount Sinai and Arabia Petraea: A Journal of Travels in the year 1838. Vol. 3. Boston: Crocker & Brewster.
- Schumacher, G. (1888). "Population list of the Liwa of Akka". Quarterly Statement – Palestine Exploration Fund. 20: 169–191.
