= Shmidel =

Shmidel is a surname of German or Yiddish origin.

== Notable people ==
- Dovid Shmidel (born 1934), rabbi and the chairman of Asra Kadisha
- Felix Shmidel (1955–2023), Israeli social psychologist, anthropologist, chemical engineer, and methodologist
