= Dovid Shmidel =

Israeli rabbi (1934–2026)

Rabbi Dovid Shmidel דוד שמידל
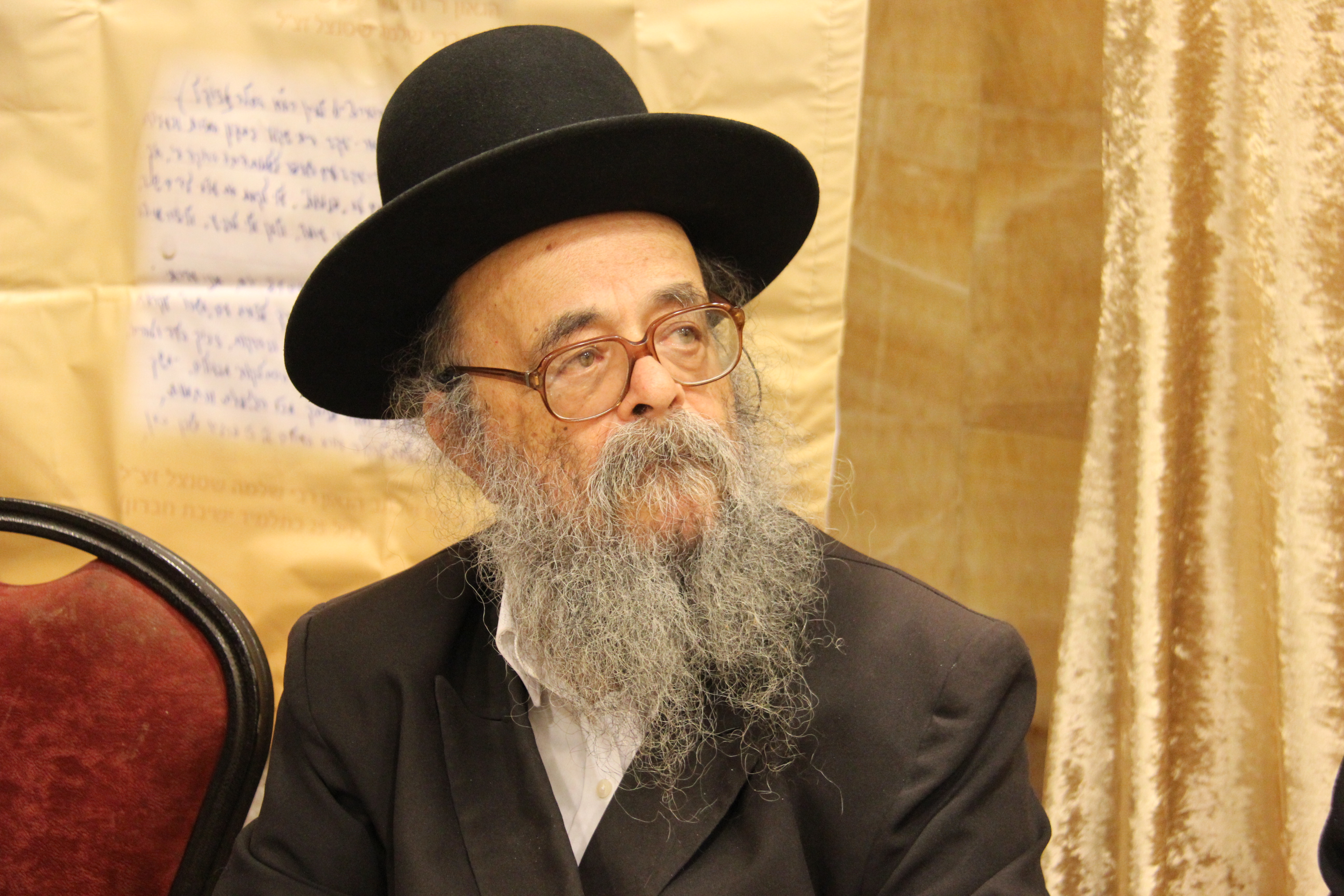
- Shmidel in 2014

Personal life
- Born: April 2, 1934 Vienna, Austria
- Died: May 11, 2026 (aged 92) Bnei Brak, Israel
- Children: 8
- Occupation: Rabbi

Religious life
- Religion: Judaism
- Denomination: Orthodox Judaism

Jewish leader
- Residence: Bnei Brak

Dovid Shmidel (also spelled Dovid Schmidel; Hebrew: דוד שמידל; April 2, 1934 – May 11, 2026) was an Austrian-born Israeli rabbi in Bnei Brak who was the Chairman of Asra Kadisha (the Committee for the Preservation of Gravesites). He was involved in struggles against excavations at various locations including at the Tomb of Maimonides in Tiberias in 1956 and at Israel's Highway 6; as well as at the disputed tomb of Antigonus II Mattathias in East Jerusalem. For an entire year, Shmidel was occupied with preserving the old Jewish cemetery in Egypt.

== Biography ==
Shmidel was born in Vienna, Austria, on April 2, 1934. In 1939, at age 5, he moved with his family to Mandatory Palestine. He studied at the Slabodka yeshiva and later at Kollel Chazon Ish in Bnei Brak under Rabbi Gedaliah Nadel.

He headed a kollel in Komemiyut for tens of married men who live in Jerusalem, Beit Shemesh, and other places, but they stay all week at the kollel and only go home for Shabbat. Shmidel delivered shiurim once or twice a week.

Shmidel died in Bnei Brak on May 11, 2026, at the age of 92.

== Public disputes and controversies ==
Shmidel's tenure as chairman of Asra Kadisha included several high-profile public disputes that received extensive coverage in Israeli media.

=== Stone-throwing at Rabbi Yosef Shalom Elyashiv's home (1997–1998) ===
In 1997–1998, during preparatory excavations for the Uzi Narkiss road near Pisgat Ze'ev in Jerusalem, dozens of graves were discovered. Rabbi Yosef Shalom Elyashiv, then the leading Lithuanian Haredi posek, ruled that the bones could be preserved in place by deep drilling and reinterment in clay vessels. Shmidel and Asra Kadisha rejected the compromise. Activists associated with the organization demonstrated outside Elyashiv's home in Jerusalem and threw stones at the building. The Lithuanian Haredi daily Yated Ne'eman published a sharp article condemning Asra Kadisha, and several prominent activists left the organization in protest to form a rival group, HaAguda LeMeniyat Chilul Kvarim, under Rabbi Micha Rothschild, an Elyashiv associate.

=== Beating of Aryeh Goloventzitz and rabbinic condemnation (2013) ===
The most prolonged internal Haredi controversy of Shmidel's tenure concerned the "Goloventzitz compound" in Ramat Beit Shemesh, a project of roughly 5,500 housing units. After burial caves were discovered in 2012, Rabbi Moshe Sternbuch, the Raavad (Chief Justice) of the Edah HaChareidis, personally inspected the site and ruled that there was no halachic problem with construction because the burials were not Jewish. Shmidel and Asra Kadisha rejected the ruling and launched a multi-year campaign against the developers and against Sternbuch personally.

On the night of 2 Elul 5773 (August 7, 2013), eight men identifying themselves as members of Asra Kadisha entered the Bayit Vegan home of developer Aryeh Goloventzitz by impersonating charity collectors. According to the developer's testimony, after he invited them in to make a donation, they beat him in front of his wife and daughter with a blunt object, fracturing his skull, and warned him: "This is only a first visit — the next will be worse." Goloventzitz was hospitalized for 14 hours at Hadassah Medical Center. Goloventzitz later told Bechadrei Chareidim that the attackers shouted at him that he was a rasha merusha ("wicked and evil") specifically for following Sternbuch's ruling rather than Shmidel's. When Goloventzitz subsequently visited Rabbi Chaim Kanievsky in Bnei Brak, Kanievsky's blessing — recorded on video by Kikar HaShabbat — was the unusually pointed phrase: "Hashem should help you escape from them."

The Israel Police subsequently raided several homes in Mea Shearim to arrest the attackers. Asra Kadisha-aligned protesters smashed the windows of police vehicles entering the neighborhood and shouted "Nazis, get out of here" at officers. Wider riots tied to the Asra Kadisha protests in Beit Shemesh led to 29 arrests, the torching of garbage containers, the setting of a forest fire adjacent to the construction site, and attacks on firefighters who arrived to extinguish it.

On 20 August 2013, Rabbis Chaim Kanievsky and Nissim Karelitz — two of the most senior Lithuanian Haredi authorities of the period — issued an unusually sharp public letter condemning Asra Kadisha. They called the organization's activists "inshi delo ma'ali" (Imperial Aramaic: אינשי דלא מעלי, "worthless people") who "have opened their mouths and their tongues against one of the great Torah sages of our generation", and prayed that they would "fully repent". Rabbis from the neighborhood of Har Nof, where Sternbuch lived — including representatives of Ger, Vizhnitz, the Bostoner Rebbe, and the roshei yeshiva of Hebron Yeshiva and Pachad Yitzchak — signed a parallel letter of condemnation.

The engineering supervisor Rabbi Zalman Menachem Koren told Bechadrei Chareidim that he had personally driven the elderly Sternbuch to inspect the site. While they were still in the car returning to Jerusalem, an Asra Kadisha activist phoned Koren mockingly asking what Sternbuch had concluded — proving the rabbi's vehicle had been under surveillance. Koren described Asra Kadisha's deputy chairman Chezki Kalmanovich as a "bully who took over Asra Kadisha". Asra Kadisha also organized propaganda posters in Jerusalem and Beit Shemesh labeling buyers in the project shaknak — a Hebrew acronym for "dwellers of graves" — and Asra Kadisha-aligned figures called for buyers to be placed under a cherem (formal ban).

The developer Rabbi Yitzchak Pirer told Bechadrei Chareidim that Asra Kadisha had demanded 200 million shekels for the engineering modifications it sought to impose, which would have added approximately 150,000 shekels to the cost of each apartment, and described Asra Kadisha activists as "charlatans". In February 2019, after roughly seven years of conflict and once residents had begun moving into the project, Kanievsky issued a handwritten ruling stating that "the place is certainly fit for the residence of kohenim and God-fearing people" — effectively rejecting Asra Kadisha's position in writing. A 2024 arbitration ruling reported by Globes ordered the developer Nof Tzurim to pay the Goloventzitz family 68.5 million shekels in compensation tied to delayed payments stemming from the project.

=== Allegations of "protection money": the 2013 Walla! investigation ===
On 2 September 2013, Walla! news published an undercover investigation by Yaki Adamker and Yehoshua Breiner titled "Haredi Protection: Pay and You Can Build on Graves". Using hidden cameras, the report alleged that Haredi workers operating in coordination with Asra Kadisha at a quarry near Ramla were quietly exhuming bones believed by some to be Jewish for paying developers, even as Asra Kadisha was publicly leading violent riots against similar work in Beit Shemesh where developers refused to pay. The reporters wrote that the workers fled the site when they saw cameras and returned only after the cameras were turned off.

The report named Mendel Eckstein as the operator on site, and identified Chezki Kalmanovich — Asra Kadisha's deputy chairman and presumed successor to Shmidel — as supervising the work. Asked to respond, Shmidel told Walla!: "Our people have no connection to the excavations at the quarry in Ramla", while conceding that Eckstein "operates from time to time under our direction".

Two named former insiders gave on-the-record statements. Aharaleh Yaktor, a former Asra Kadisha activist who had left to establish a rival organization, described Asra Kadisha as "an organization of murderers... if you refuse to pay, they will make your life miserable, demonstrate under your house, threaten your children, and do everything to stop the work." Yaktor also described a price list he said he had heard from a secular developer: "Got a million dollars? They evacuate two graves every Monday. Got only half a million? They build arches. Nothing? They send protesters with water bottles." Shalom Frid, a Ministry of Religious Affairs adviser on grave matters who had previously worked with Asra Kadisha for 28 years, said: "It's an organization without rules. Whoever decides is Rabbi Shmidel himself, and when he needs to, he permits himself." Frid also accused Asra Kadisha of burying excavated bones in building foundations in violation of Israeli law, which requires bones to be transferred to the Ministry of Religious Affairs.

In a separate 2011 op-ed in Kikar HaShabbat, Yaktor accused Shmidel of pressuring detained protesters not to sign release agreements, ignoring the tears of arrestees' children, and promising taxi fare to released protesters that was never paid. Yaktor further alleged that Shmidel's circle had planned for the Rachmastrivka Rebbe to be physically attacked during a protest in order to provoke wider unrest, and had asked Yaktor not to coordinate the Rebbe's arrival with police. Yaktor also alleged that Shmidel had sent him personally to take possession of desecrated burial land in Nazareth, but that the organization lost interest in the operation because it was not useful for its public profile.

=== Abu Kabir protocol: alleged hypocrisy on excavation (2009–2011) ===
In May 2011, Kikar HaShabbat published the minutes of a 28 June 2009 meeting at the Israel Antiquities Authority, supplied by Yaktor. The minutes recorded that the meeting was held at the request of Shmidel personally, and stated its stated purpose verbatim as "the request of Rabbi Schmidel from Shuka Dorfman that the Antiquities Authority excavate Jewish graves on the relevant land for the purpose of public display." The land in question was the ancient Jewish cemetery at Abu Kabir in Jaffa. Other rabbis, including Israel's Chief Rabbi Yisrael Meir Lau, had publicly opposed the excavation. The reported request appeared to contradict Asra Kadisha's stated public position prohibiting any disturbance of Jewish graves.

=== Yedioth Ahronoth investigation: infrastructure capture (2011) ===
A separate investigation by Guy Lieberman in the Yedioth Ahronoth weekend supplement 7 Yamim, summarized in Bechadrei Chareidim, alleged that Asra Kadisha under Shmidel had captured significant influence over Israeli infrastructure planning. The report documented Asra Kadisha's role in delaying construction of Israel's Highway 6, the doubling of the Tel Aviv–Be'er Sheva railway near Ramla, an industrial expansion in Shoham, and infrastructure projects in Yehud, Akko, and Kibbutz Parod. Then-chairman of Israel Railways Yaakov Efrati told the paper: "[Asra Kadisha] is not a public body, but it decides... Until we reached agreements with them last year, it was impossible to continue work, and that caused, in my estimation, a six-month delay." Ramla mayor Yoel Lavi was quoted: "It cannot be that Asra Kadisha will dictate to an entire city to be stuck in a traffic jam." A construction manager described being summoned to the office of the Israel Railways chairman to find Shmidel and former Knesset member Meir Porush waiting there: "The feeling was of a kangaroo court."

The same report alleged that Asra Kadisha maintained an internal intelligence network of informants inside the Israel Antiquities Authority, enabling its activists to arrive at sensitive sites with unusual speed. The report also alleged that, several months after Shalom Frid was hired by the Ministry of Religious Affairs as an external consultant on grave issues, the mobile phone he used was paid for by Asra Kadisha — raising the question of whether the regulator had been captured by the organization he was meant to regulate.

=== Barzilai Medical Center crisis (2009–2010) ===
In 2009–2010, Asra Kadisha led national protests against the relocation of ancient graves discovered at the planned site of a fortified emergency room at the Barzilai Medical Center in Ashkelon, an area within range of Qassam fire from Gaza. The IAA concluded that the bones were pagan — a finding confirmed after pig bones were identified at the site — but Deputy Health Minister Yaakov Litzman adopted the Asra Kadisha position, and the cabinet initially approved relocating the emergency room at an additional cost of roughly 90 million shekels to public funds. Ashkelon mayor Benny Vaknin publicly criticized Shmidel and Litzman, saying Litzman was "sanctifying the dead at the expense of the living". Opposition leader Tzipi Livni framed the affair as "a struggle over Judaism", and Haaretz columnist Yossi Sarid wrote that "in the eyes of the Israeli government, the dead take precedence over the living". The cabinet ultimately reversed course, and the graves were exhumed under heavy police protection; 47 Asra Kadisha activists were arrested attempting to trespass at the site, some of whom police suspected of setting fire to nearby fields.

At the height of the crisis, Shmidel told Haaretz: "Only risking lives will enable us to stop the desecration. We will fight even if they dig up the graves of soldiers and other Jews." Yair Ettinger of Haaretz profiled him on 24 March 2010 under the headline "Holder of the Dignity-of-the-Dead Portfolio and his War Against the Hospital".

=== Violence against archaeologists ===
A 2021 peer-reviewed study in Israel Affairs by Avi Sasson and Eliav Taub documents that Asra Kadisha's conflicts with Israeli archaeologists during Shmidel's tenure repeatedly involved intimidation, vandalism, and assault. During the Mamilla excavations in Jerusalem in November 1992, after the archaeologists Ronny Reich and Eli Shukron returned to a disputed burial cave to collect remaining finds, they discovered that all eight tires on their two vehicles had been slashed. During subsequent protests between November 1992 and January 1993, six police officers were injured by stones thrown at them, some requiring hospitalization; protesters also overturned cars belonging to non-Jewish bystanders and minority residents.

The Israel Antiquities Authority under its founding director Amir Drori was the target of telephone harassment campaigns during this period; Drori publicly testified to the harassment. In 1984, during a Tiberias hotel construction dispute, Asra Kadisha activists publicly cast a pulsa diNura death curse on those involved in the project; when three workers later died, the organization's supporters attributed the deaths to the curse.

In December 2011, after an antiquities storage container was set ablaze overnight at a National Roads Company excavation site on the Afula bypass, destroying archaeological finds, a senior Asra Kadisha activist told Ynet that the organization did not regret the arson: "When they take the graves of our fathers, the great righteous ones, no one cares; but if anyone damages something there, everything is in an uproar."

=== Jaffa Andromeda Hill and the "pig bones" denial (2011) ===
In 2010 and 2011, Asra Kadisha led extended protests at the Andromeda Hill hotel and residential complex in Jaffa. After the IAA found that the burials at the site included pig bones — definitive evidence that the burials were not Jewish — Shmidel rejected the findings in an interview with Haaretz: "We assume that the people buried here were Jews, and so we are going to continue the struggle... We heard the story about the pigs. Not long ago a private archaeologist hired to appear in court told an unlikely story about pigs. Who is buried with pig bones in a burial cave? Not Jews and not non-Jews." A separate Haaretz analysis described the Andromeda Hill riots as part of a wider internal Haredi struggle and noted that Rabbis Ovadia Yosef, Aharon Leib Shteinman, and Elyashiv had all refused to sign a proposed boycott against the Electra real estate firm despite voicing support for halting the project, with moderate members of the Edah HaChareidis rabbinical court opposing Asra Kadisha's tactics.

=== Bank Leumi boycott (1984) ===
During an earlier Tiberias dispute concerning a hotel project undertaken by a subsidiary of Bank Leumi, Shmidel was involved in a coordinated rabbinic call for a public boycott of the bank. Haredi depositors withdrew funds from Bank Leumi en masse, and Haredi businessmen closed commercial accounts. The economic pressure forced the bank's management to require the hotel operator to find a compromise acceptable to Asra Kadisha.

=== Aura affair in Yehud (2025) ===
A major confrontation in the final year of Shmidel's life arose in 2025, when the urban renewal firm Aura, headed by Yaakov Atrakchi, began work on a project in Yehud after the IAA identified approximately 280 graves at the construction site. Asra Kadisha, led by Kalmanovich, demanded that Aura preserve the bones in place via a concrete burial chamber under the planned parking garage. Atrakchi, who said the redesign would cost roughly 10 million shekels, refused.

Calcalist reported that approximately 100 Haredi protesters arrived at Atrakchi's Tel Aviv home by bus, broke through his gate, smashed his intercom, damaged his garden, and threw bags of human excrement at the property and at members of his family, before moving on to attack the home of Aura's deputy CEO in Elkana in a similar manner. Atrakchi described the events to Calcalist and Ynet as "a pogrom" and said that the protesters had each been paid 1,000 shekels and bused to the site, an allegation Kalmanovich denied. Atrakchi further alleged that Asra Kadisha-affiliated activists set fire to a tractor at the Yehud construction site shortly afterward. Police later arrested Kalmanovich for organizing illegal protests; the Edah HaChareidis warned of further demonstrations if he was not released, and protests in Jerusalem followed.

=== Death of Avraham Walles (2014) ===
On 4 August 2014 (Tisha B'Av eve), Avraham Walles, a 29-year-old Toldos Aharon Hasid and father of five, was killed in a tractor attack in the Shmuel HaNavi neighborhood of Jerusalem. Walles was working as a site inspector for Asra Kadisha when he was struck and killed by a tractor driven by Mohammed Naif Ja'abis, who was subsequently shot and killed by security forces. Walles had not originally been scheduled to be at the site that day, but had agreed to substitute for another inspector. Shmidel delivered one of the eulogies at the funeral. In an essay published in Charedim 10, commentator Daniel Goldman wrote that the presence of Shmidel and Asra Kadisha on the funeral stage was disturbing given the organization's "involvement in not a few violent incidents", and implicitly questioned whether the practice of stationing untrained Haredi inspectors at active construction sites had contributed to Walles's death.
