= Kollel Chazon Ish =

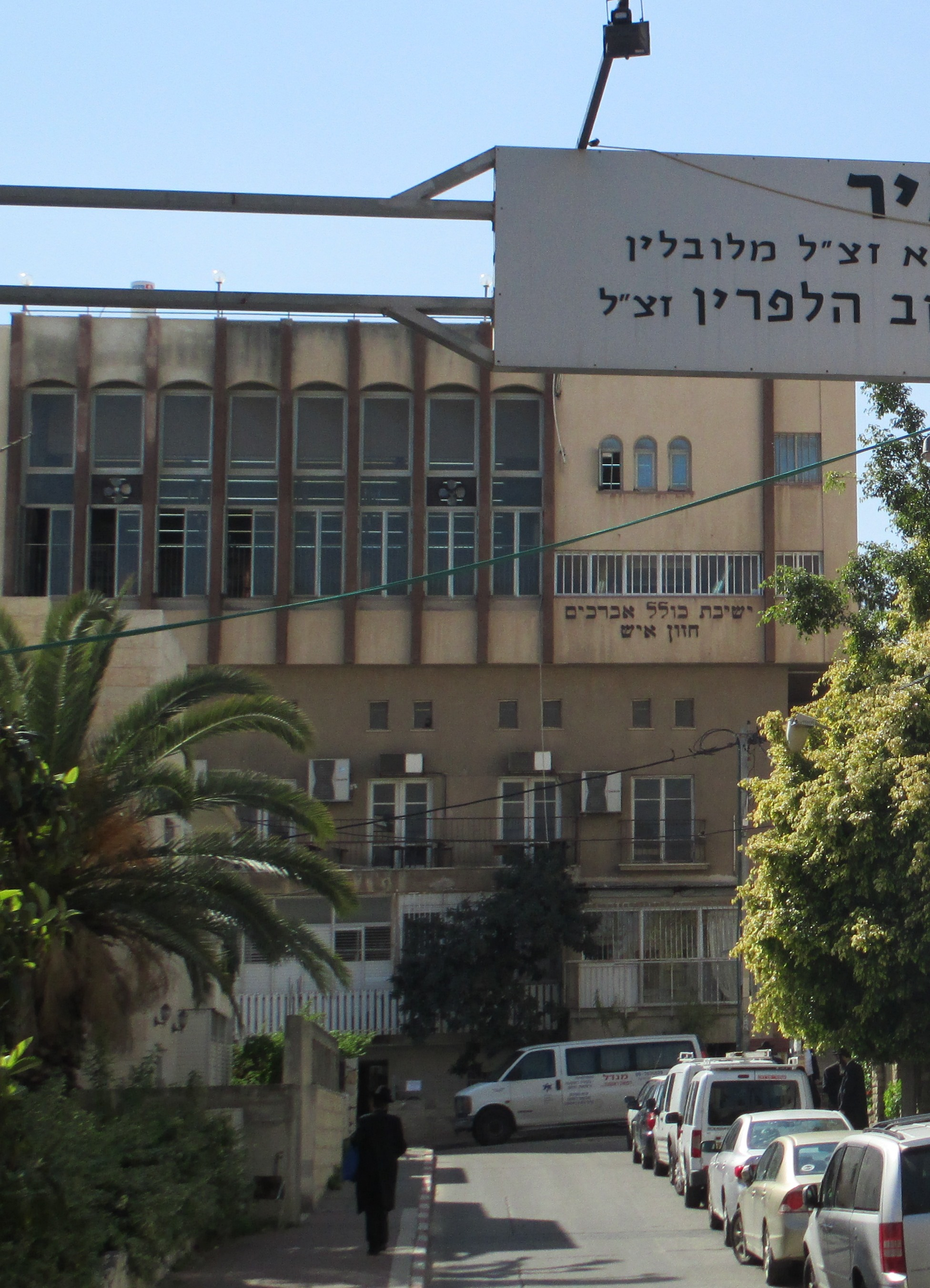
Exterior of Kollel Chazon Ish. Words on the building's facade read Yeshivas Kollel Avreichim Chazon Ish

Kollel Chazon Ish is a kollel (group of married Jewish men who study Torah) of rabbis on HaAri St 3, in Bnei Brak, Israel with a focus on Talmud study.

The Kollel was originally established by Rabbi Avrohom Yeshaya Karelitz, who was known as the Chazon Ish. Rabbi Yaakov Yisrael Kanievsky, his brother-in-law, taught there.

== Notable members ==
- Rabbi Yechezkel Brettler
- Rabbi Aharon Feldman
- Rabbi Chaim Kanievsky
- Rabbi Nissim Karelitz
- Rabbi Yaakov Kohn
- Rabbi Gedaliah Nadel
- Rabbi Moshe Shmuel Shapiro
- Rabbi Yehuda Shapiro (Yudel Shapiro)
- Rabbi Dovid Shmidel
- Rabbi Aaron Teitelbaum
- Rabbi Yisroel Eliyahu Weintraub
- Rabbi Yechezkel Moskovitz
