= Asra Kadisha =

Jewish cemetery preservation organization

- אתרא קדישא
- Formation: 1959; 67 years ago
- Founder: Yitzchok Zev Soloveitchik
- Founded at: Israel
- Type: Nonprofit
- Legal status: Association
- Purpose: Graves preservation
- Region served: International
- Chairman: Vacant
- Key people: Yitzchok Tuvia Weiss
- Parent organisation: Edah HaChareidis

Asra Kadisha (Hebrew: אתרא קדישא lit. 'Holy Place') is an international organization for the preservation of Jewish cemeteries and gravesites.

== Description ==
The organisation's focus is the preservation of Jewish cemeteries and gravesites throughout the world. It strives to avoid desecration of ancient gravesites by preventing construction in their vicinity.

== History ==
Asra Kadisha was founded in Israel in 1959. According to the organisation's longtime director, Dovid Shmidel, Joel Teitelbaum asked Yitzchok Zev Soloveitchik to establish Asra Kadisha as a response to excavations at Beit She'arim National Park.

In 2013, a new housing development under construction in the Ramat Avraham neighbourhood of Beit Shemesh was found to be situated atop an ancient burial ground. Since Jewish law forbids the desecration of cemeteries, the project was put on hold pending an investigation. Asra Kadisha, led at the time by its spiritual leader Yitzchok Tuvia Weiss, determined that all construction on the site must immediately be halted, with the area to be left permanently abandoned. However, Weiss' Edah HaChareidis colleague Moshe Sternbuch issued a competing ruling through his Agudat Eretz HaHayim burial society, declaring that it was permissible to investigate the remains, the aftermath of which led to resumption of the construction work. As a result of Weiss' ruling being ignored, rioting ensued in Ramat Avraham on the part of Haredi residents from Ramat Beit Shemesh Bet and Mea Shearim.

== See also ==
- Chevra kadisha
