= Aron Grünhut =

- אהרן גרינהוט
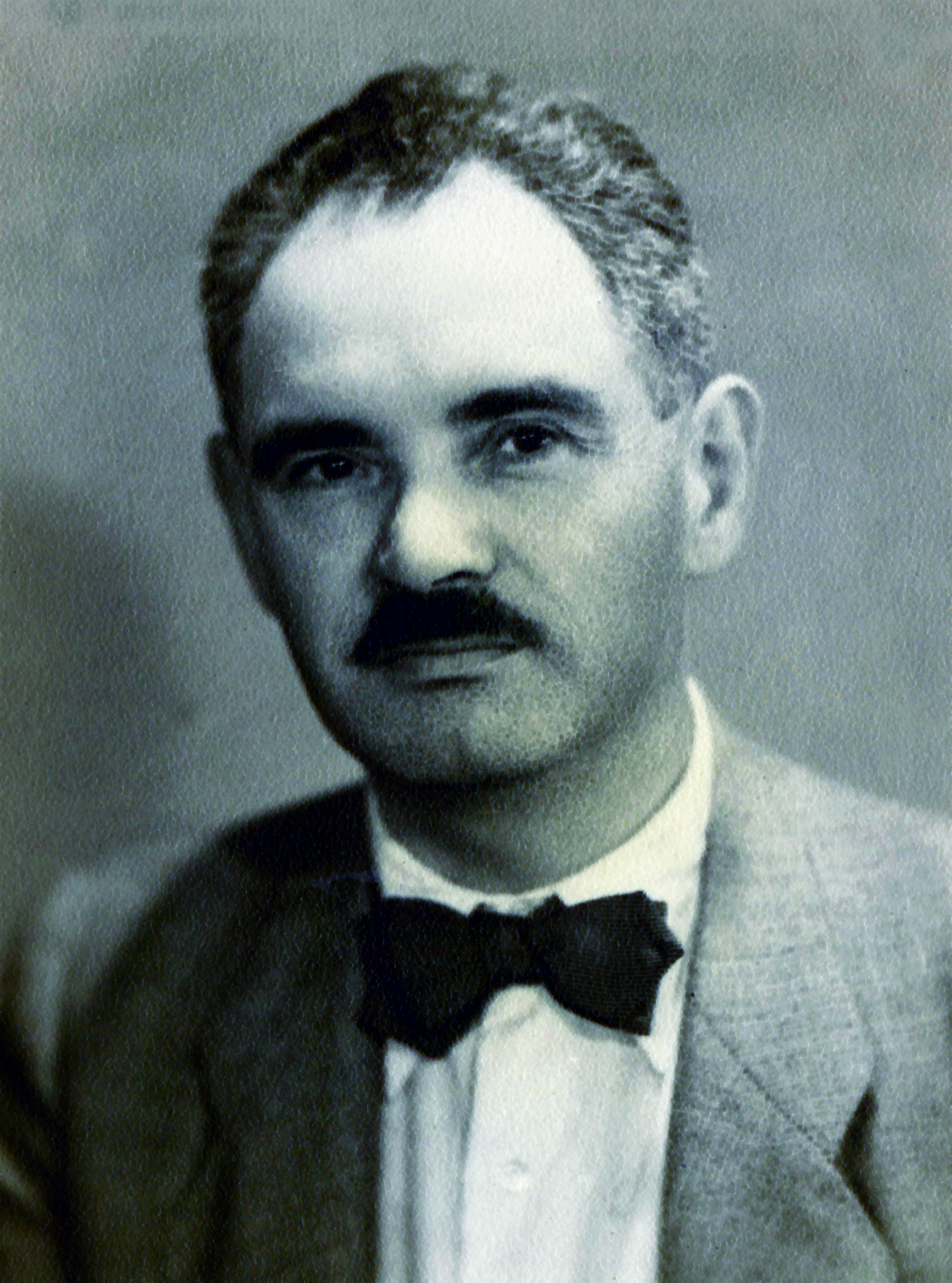
- Born: 31 March 1895; Bratislava, Austria-Hungary
- Died: 6 May 1974 (aged 79)
- Citizenship: Israel
- Occupation: Activist
- Known for: Rescue of Jews during The Holocaust.

Aron Grünhut (31 March 1895 – 6 May 1974) was a Bratislava-based Jewish activist who helped 1,365 Slovak, Czech, Hungarian, and Austrian Jews illegally emigrate to Palestine before and during World War II. Grünhut later received an unauthorized Salvedorean visa from George Mandel-Mantello for himself and his family.

== Biography ==
=== Interwar period ===
In the interwar period, Grünhut became a restaurant entrepreneur and devoted himself primarily to the trade in goose liver. He ran a Jewish restaurant, was a member of the Chamber of Commerce and Industry and was active in the Orthodox Jewish community in Bratislava. Thanks to his work as a merchant and frequent trips abroad, Grünhut understood a lot about the political situation in Europe. He watched with concern the radicalization of conditions in Germany and knew of the danger that threatened Jews as a result of Hitler's policies. A notable case of help for Jewish refugees from persecution in Austria was Grünhut's efforts to help a hundred Jews from Kittsee and the surrounding area who were being held captive in a tugboat on the Danube island of Sihoť. After difficult efforts lasting several months, Grünhut managed to obtain valid travel documents for all of them, with which they could leave the country legally. At the same time, Grünhut had a tent camp set up for hundreds of homeless Jews who had gathered near Dunajská Streda. At the same time, he organized their departure to Palestine.

In October 1938, Grünhut rescued Juda Goldberger, a Bratislava clothing merchant, who was kidnapped and arrested in Austria on the orders of the Gestapo. Grünhut managed to free Goldberger and enable him and his family to escape to the United States. After Grünhut learned of the Kindertransports to England, which Sir Nicholas Winton had organized in Prague, he managed to ensure that a group of Jewish children could leave Bratislava. He organized the necessary travel documents for ten boys - including his son Benny - so that they could travel to London in June 1939, where they survived the war. Only after many years did it emerge that among the boys was the later Chief Rabbi of Jerusalem, Tibor (Yitzchak Tuvia) Weiss, as well as the later London Rabbi Kurt (Scholem Ber) Stern and the Israeli journalist legend Paul Kohn.

The climax of Grünhut's efforts to save Jews from Nazi persecution was his mission in July 1939, when he wanted to bring as many Jews as possible to safety in Palestine. To do this, he hired two luxury Danube steamers (Queen Elizabeth and Zar Dusan), which left the Port of Bratislava with 1,365 refugees from Slovakia, Austria, Bohemia and Moravia. The boat trip, which was initially planned for six days, was significantly extended due to reprisals by the Bulgarian and British authorities, so that the refugees ultimately had to spend more than four weeks in international waters on the Danube. Only after Grünhut's difficult and intensive negotiations were they able to board the cargo ship Noemi Julia in the Romanian port of Sulina in the Danube Delta on the Black Sea and, after another exhausting 83 days, arrive at their destination in Haifa. The port city in Palestine was under British mandate at the time. Grünhut arranged the entry visas for Palestine.

=== Second World War ===
Even after the outbreak of the World War II, Grünhut did not want to leave his hometown of Bratislava and remained active in the Jewish resistance. He was arrested by the authorities in late 1942 because of his activities. He remained incarcerated as a political prisoner in Ilava for several months until his friends and family secured his release from prison in May 1943. In the meantime, Grünhut's wife and youngest son managed to escape to Hungary, where Grünhut also came after his release. In Budapest, he lived under a false identity and hid with his wife in the building of the former Czechoslovak embassy. His life was saved by the Czech stoker Emanuel Zima. Zima hid Grünhut and his wife as well as other Jews until Budapest was liberated, thus saving their lives. Grünhut never forgot this: towards the end of the 1960s, he ensured that Zima received Israel's highest civil award for foreigners, "Righteous Among the Nations".

=== Post-war years ===
Aron Grünhut returned to his hometown of Bratislava on May 10, 1945. From then on, he tried to help the few Jews returning from the Nazi concentration camps and provided accommodation and medical care for the survivors of the Holocaust. At the same time, he worked to restore the Jewish community. After the communists came to power in Czechoslovakia in 1948, Grünhut and his family decided to emigrate to the newly founded State of Israel.

Grünhut tried to keep the legacy of Jewish Bratislava alive in Jerusalem and financed the construction of a new synagogue and a yeshiva, which was given the name Pressburg. This yeshiva continued the tradition of Bratislava's oldest Jewish school, which had once been made famous by Chatam Sofer. Grünhut organized fundraising in Israel and supported Jewish communities in Slovakia. He campaigned for the rescue of the Jewish Orthodox cemetery in Bratislava and for the reconstruction of the Chatam Sofer memorial. In later years he summarized his memories of Jewish Orthodox Bratislava and the persecution of Slovak Jews in the book Katastrophenzeit des Slovakischen Judentums – Aufstieg und Niedergang der Juden von Pressburg, which was published in German in Tel Aviv in 1972.

== Memory ==
After Grünhut's death, his actions were almost forgotten in Slovakia. The public learned about his actions and the rescue of persecuted Jews thanks to the work of journalist Martin Mózer. While working on a documentary about children from Bratislava's Jewish Orthodox families threatened by Nazism, who got on the trains organized by Sir Nicholas Winton and bound for England, Mózer came across the name of Aron Grünhut, who arranged this journey for the Bratislava children. Martin Mózer began a search for Grünhut's story, the result of which was the exhibition entitled "Aron Grünhut, savior of Jews, fighter for human rights", which was held for the first time in September 2014 in the hall of the Ministry of Culture of the Slovak Republic, and Grünhut's son Benny also attended its opening.

This was followed by the Slovak edition of Grünhut's memoirs under the title "The Disaster of Slovak Jews" (Marenčin, 2015). The exhibition and the publication of the book stimulated the interest of the media in the personality of Aron Grünhut, whose name thus became more familiar to the Slovak public. On October 7, 2015, a commemorative plaque commemorating his merits in rescuing the racially persecuted citizens of Slovakia was ceremoniously unveiled at Heyduková street 8 in Bratislava, on the house where Aron Grünhut lived.

== See also ==
- Working Group (resistance organization)
