= Parod =

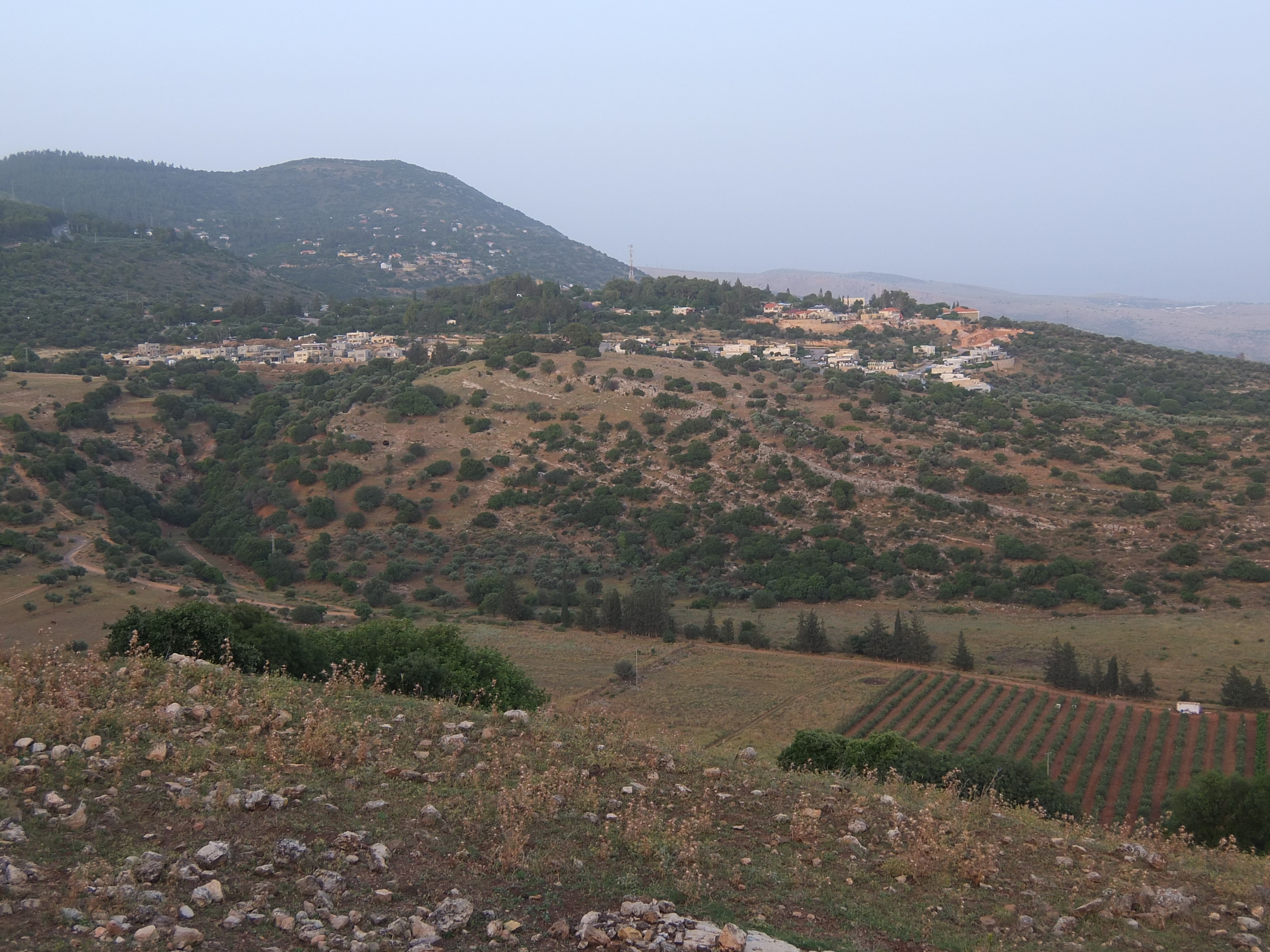
- Parod in Galilee

- Location within Northeast Israel
- Coordinates: 32°55′56″N 35°26′2″E
- Country: Israel
- District: Northern
- Subdistrict: Safed
- Council: Merom HaGalil
- Affiliation: Kibbutz Movement
- Founded: 1949
- Founder: Hungarian Jews
- Population (2024): 661

Parod (Hebrew: פָּרוֹד) is a kibbutz in northern Israel. Located in the Upper Galilee near Safed, it falls under the jurisdiction of Merom HaGalil Regional Council. In 2024 it had a population of 661.

== History ==
The community was founded in 1949 by Jewish immigrants from Hungary, on the lands of the depopulated Palestinian village of Farradiyya.

The kibbutz was initially named "Gardosh" (from Hungarian "Gárdos") to honor József Gárdos, a Hashomer Hatzair activist and member of the founding nucleus, who was successful at organising the escape of fellow Jews from Nazi-controlled Europe throughout the war, survived the Holocaust but died of illness in 1945, soon after liberation. However, it was later renamed Parod after an ancient Jewish community mentioned once in the Babylonian Talmud, probably located at the site of Farradiyya. The name, which means "separated," might also hint at the community's location on the border between the Upper and Lower Galilee.

Located to the west of Parod is the nearby, ancient hilltop ruin of Bersabe (Khirbet Abu esh-Shebaʿ), a once thriving city (later turned fortress) during the late Second Temple period. To its immediate south is the hilltop ruin of Kafr 'Inan (Kefar Hanniah), a cite once inhabited since Mishnaic times.

== Gallery ==
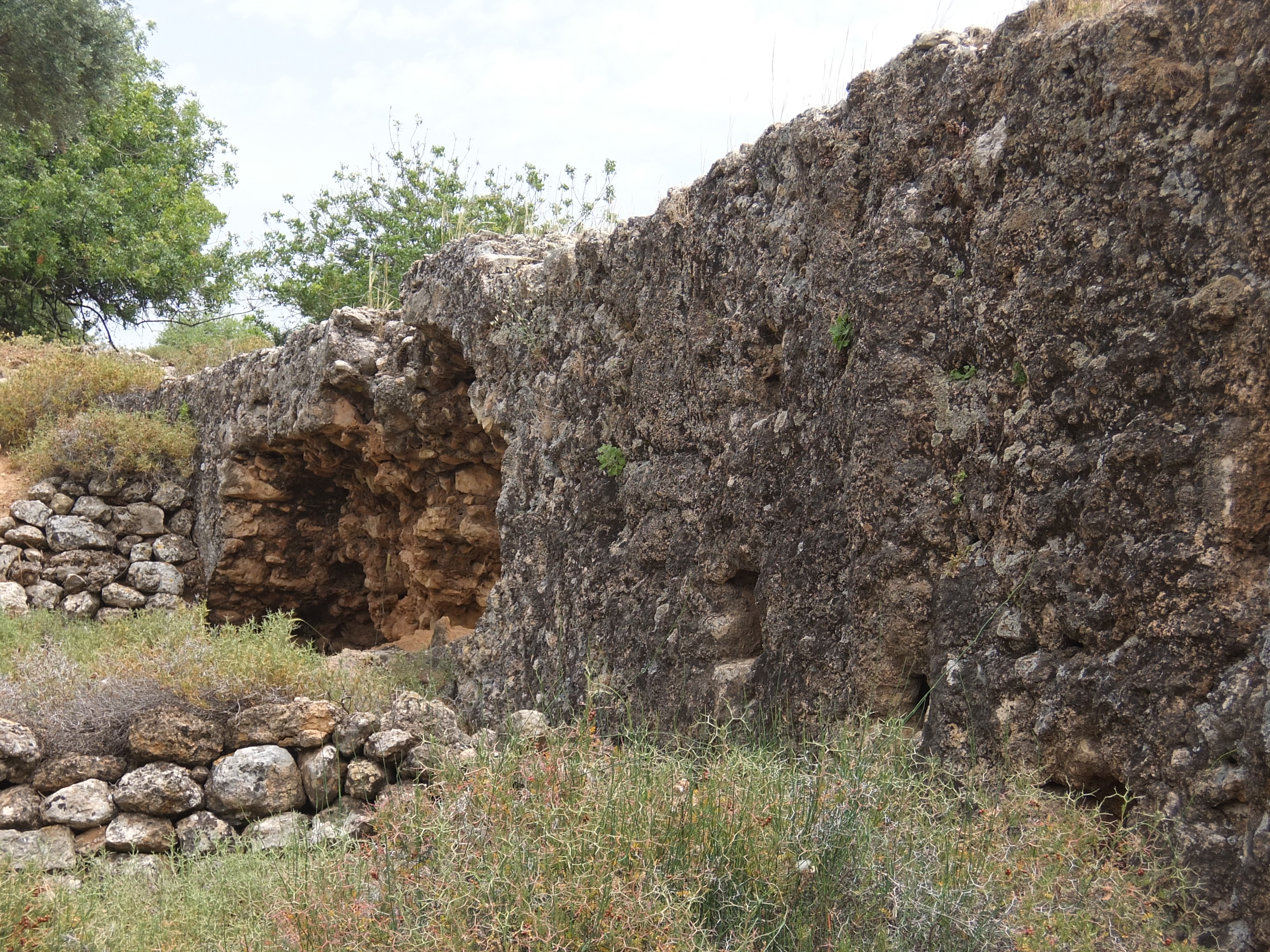
Remains of ancient Parod (Farradiyya)

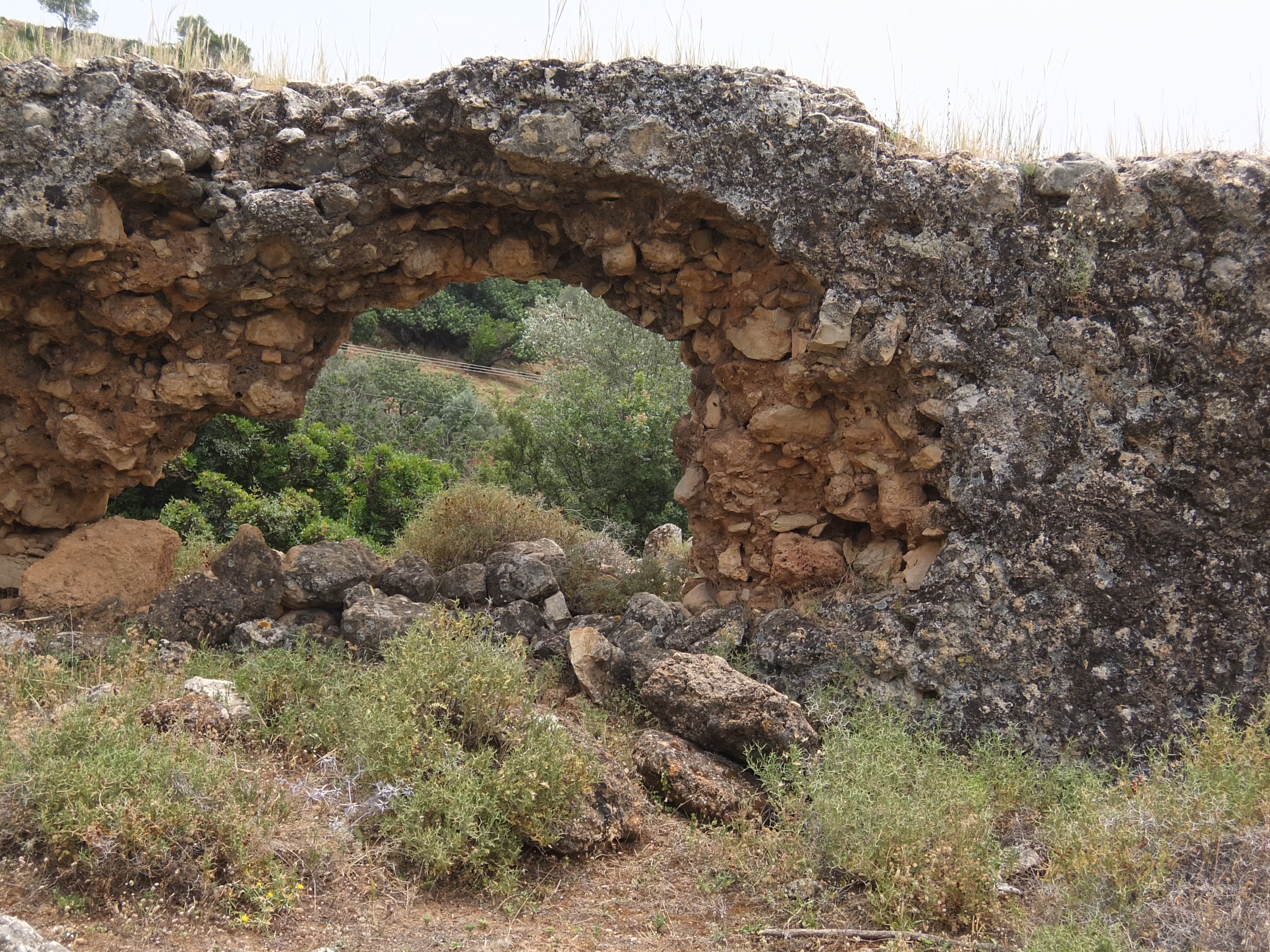
Broken wall

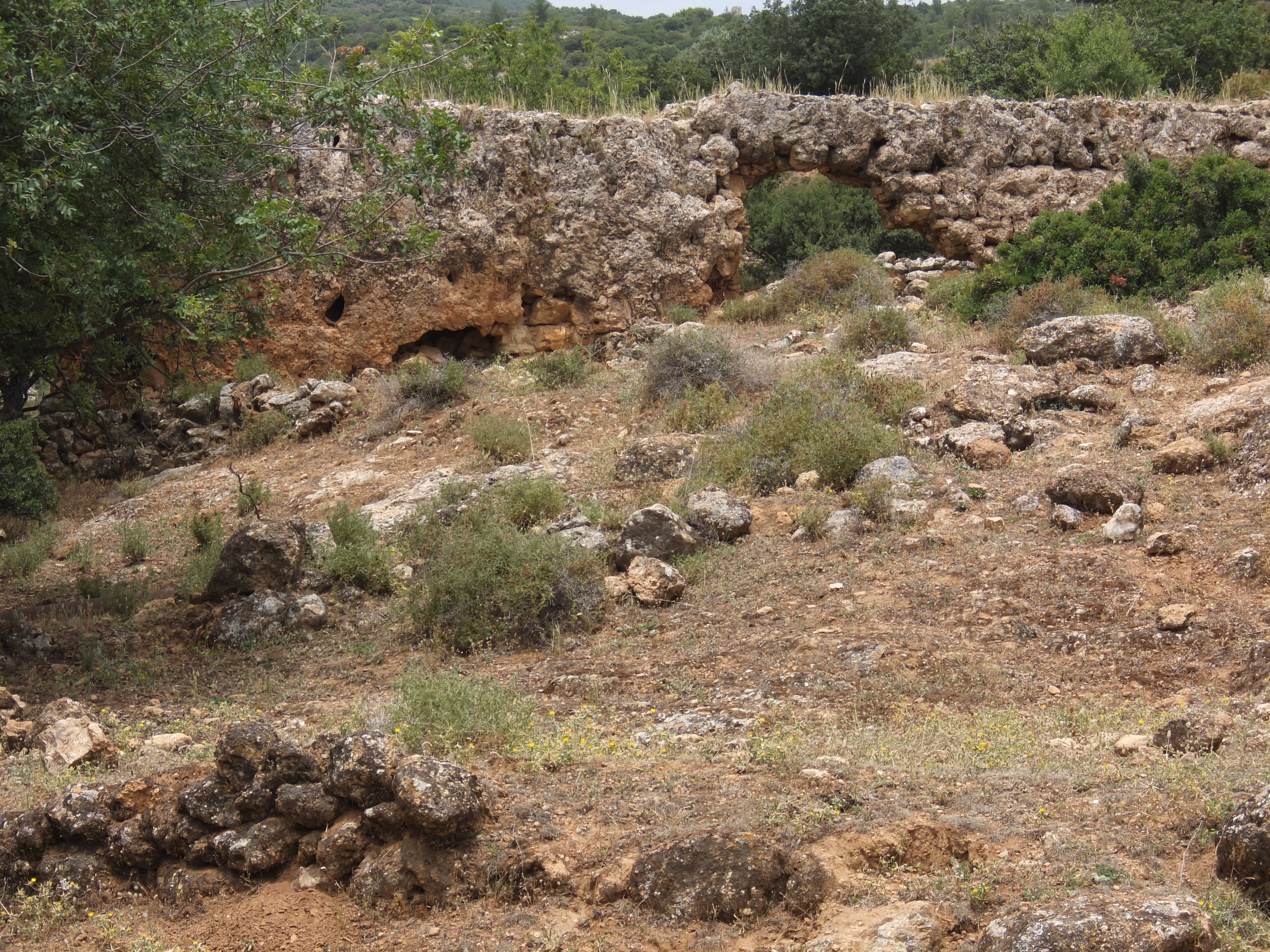
Ancient wall of Parod

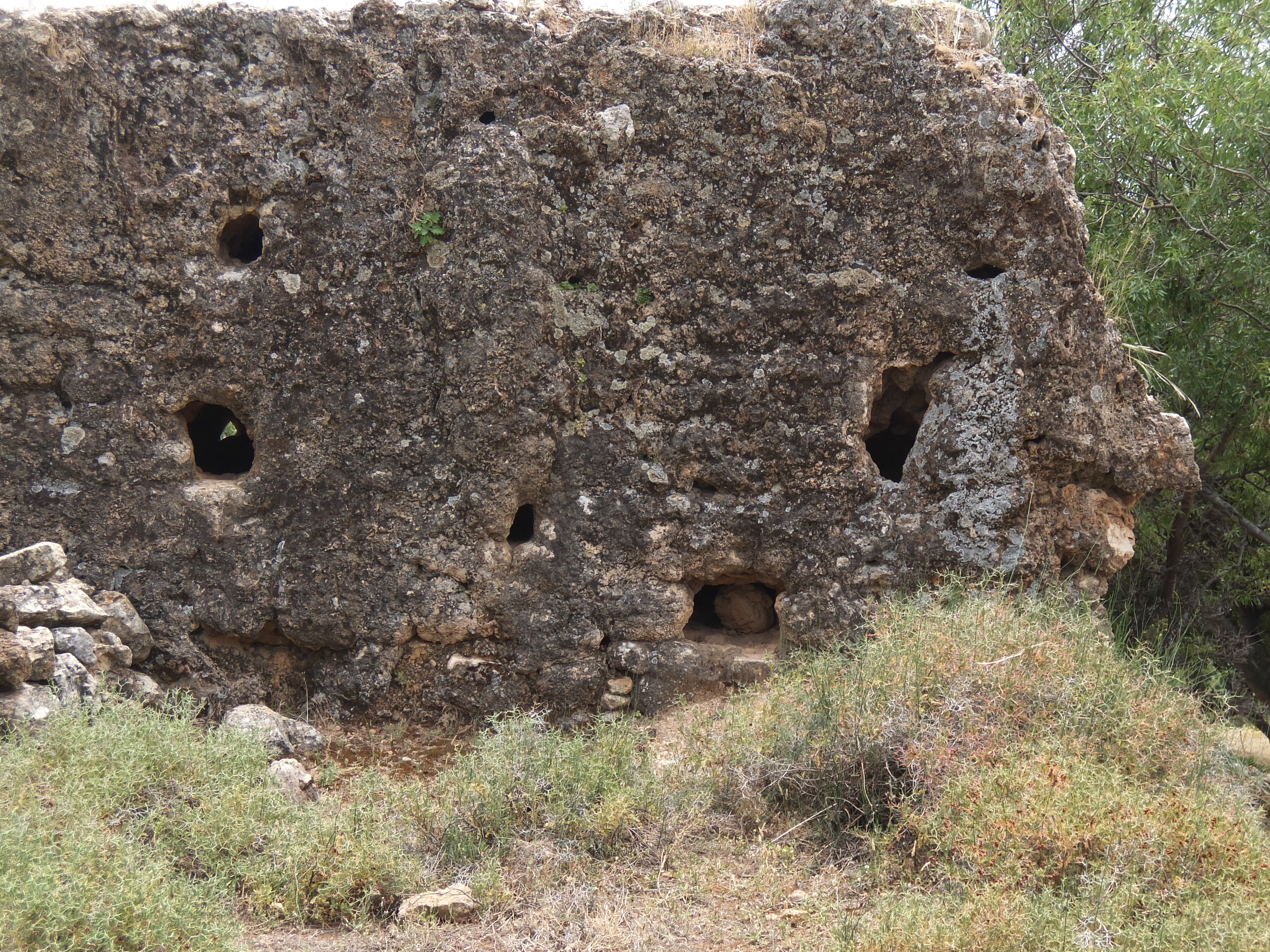
Old wall

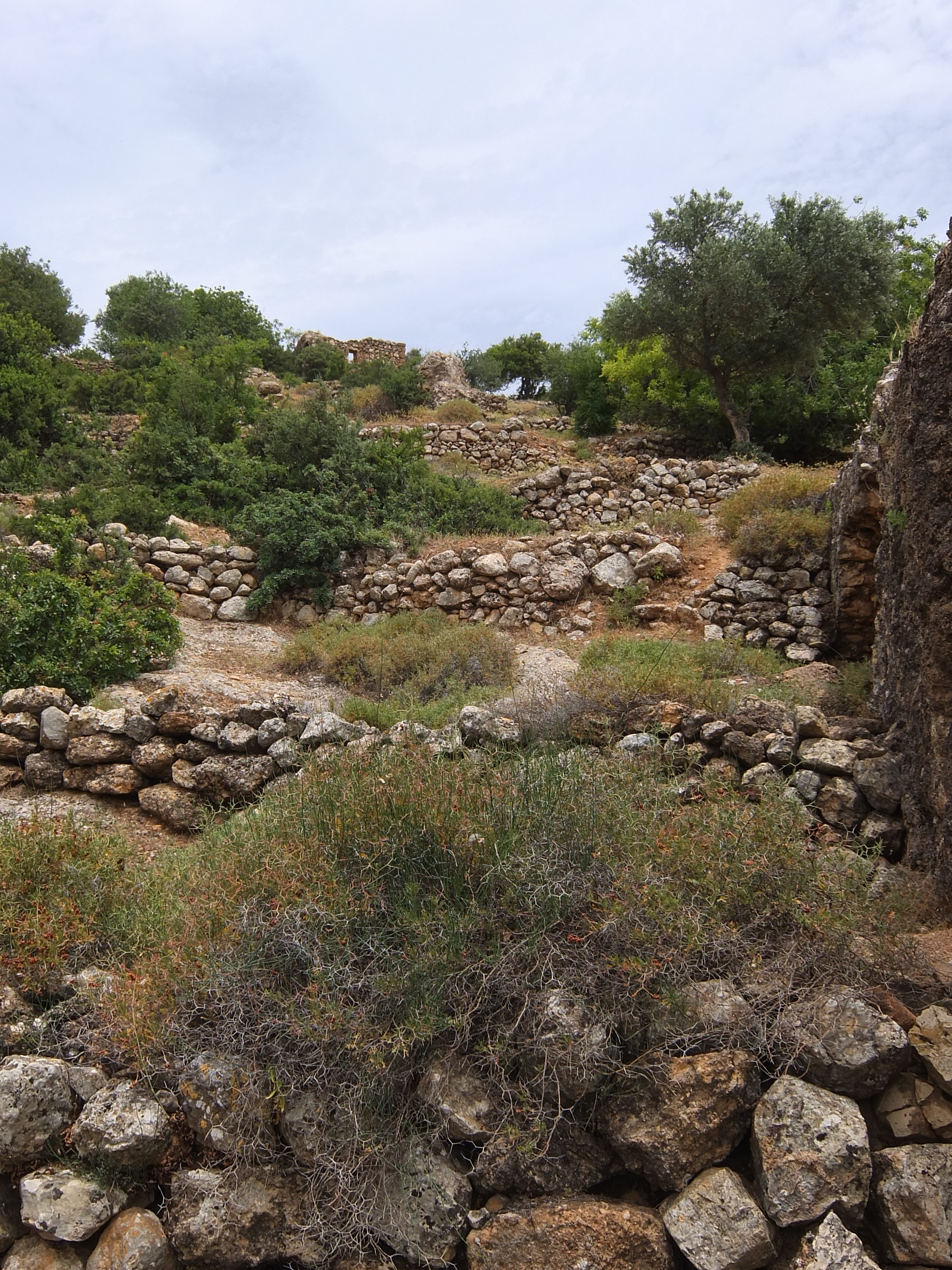
Farradiyya in Galilee

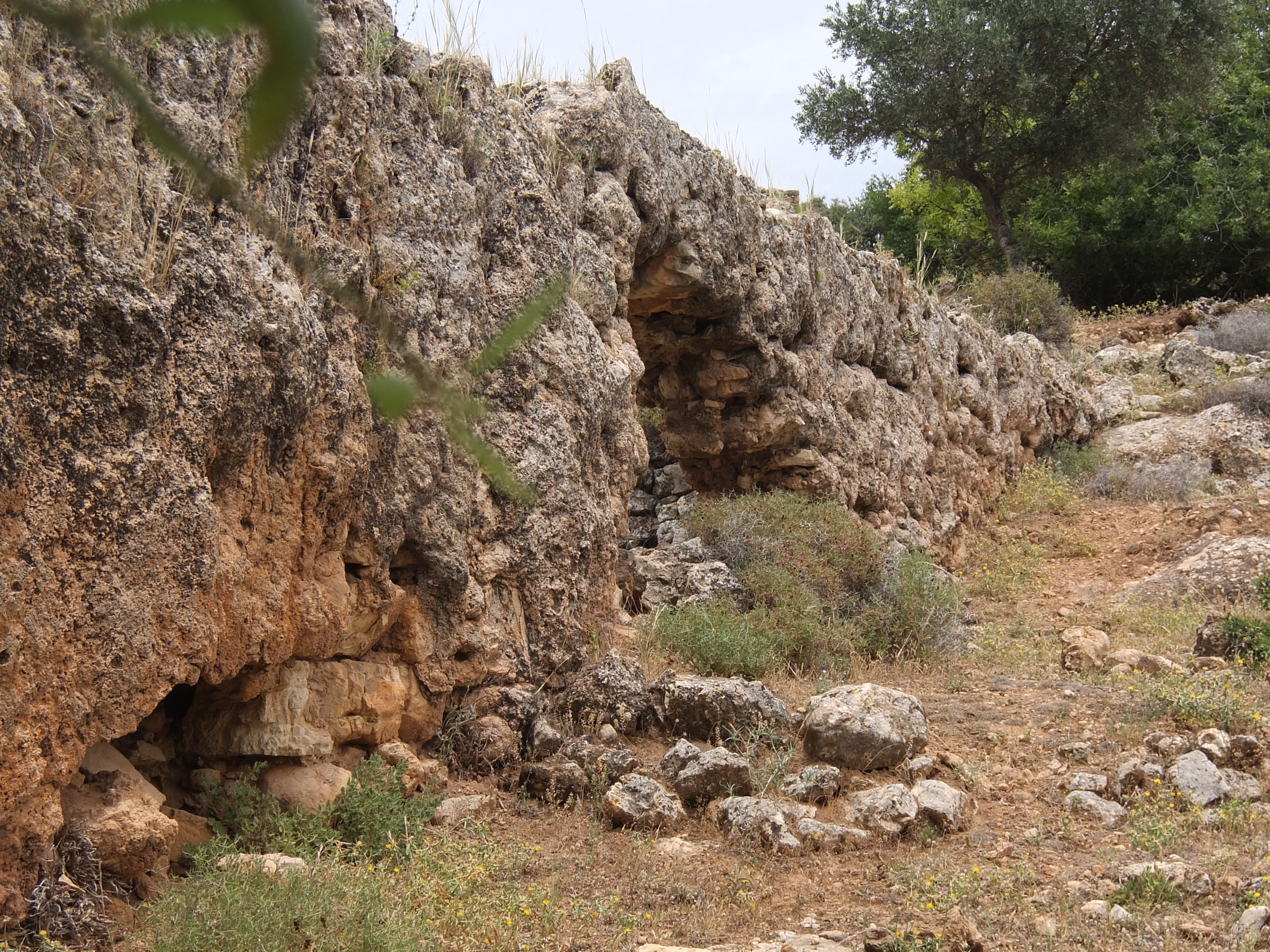
Ancient walled structure

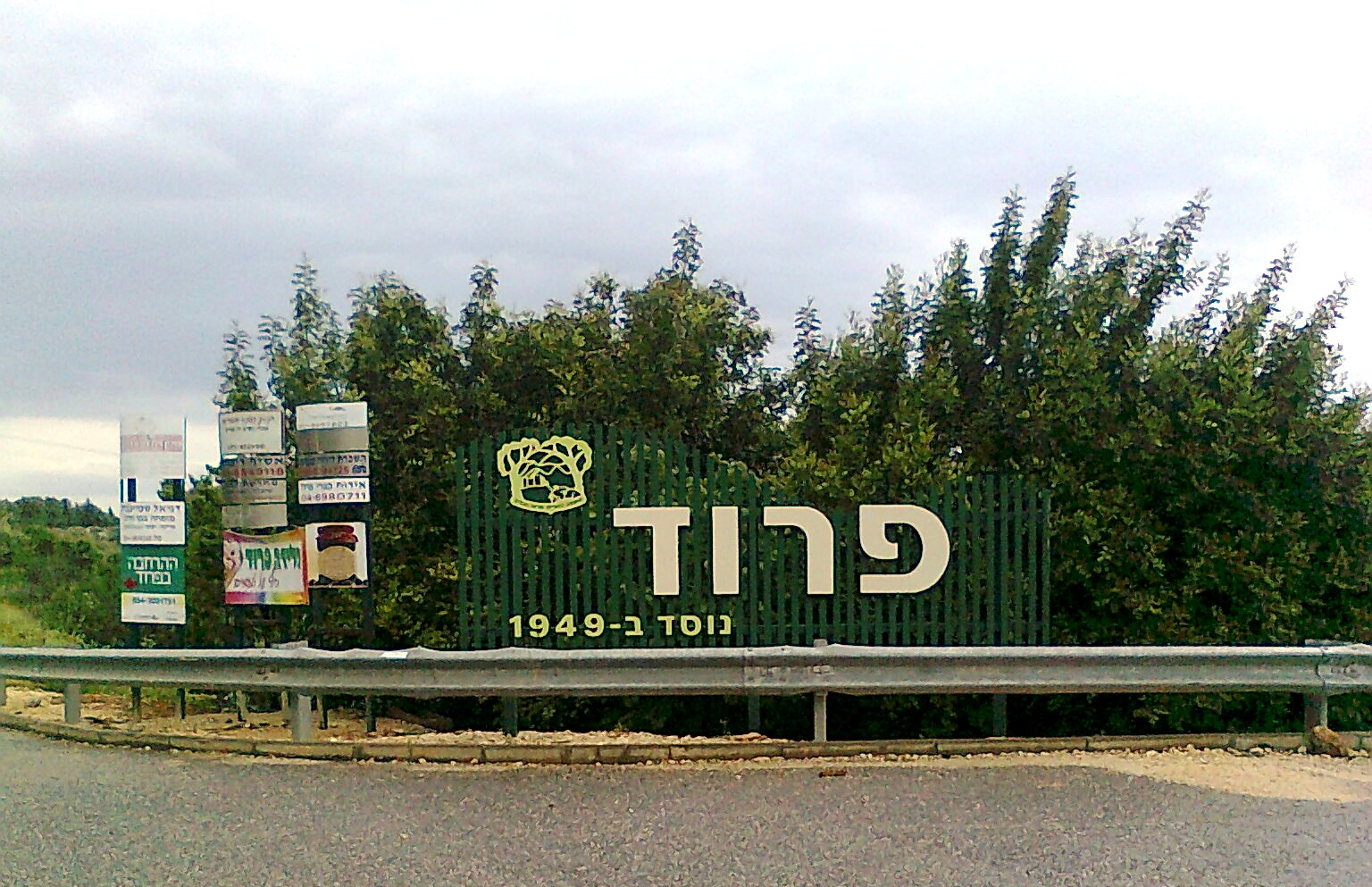
Entrance to Parod
