= Felix Shmidel =

Israeli social psychologist, anthropologist, chemical engineer

- פליקם שמידל
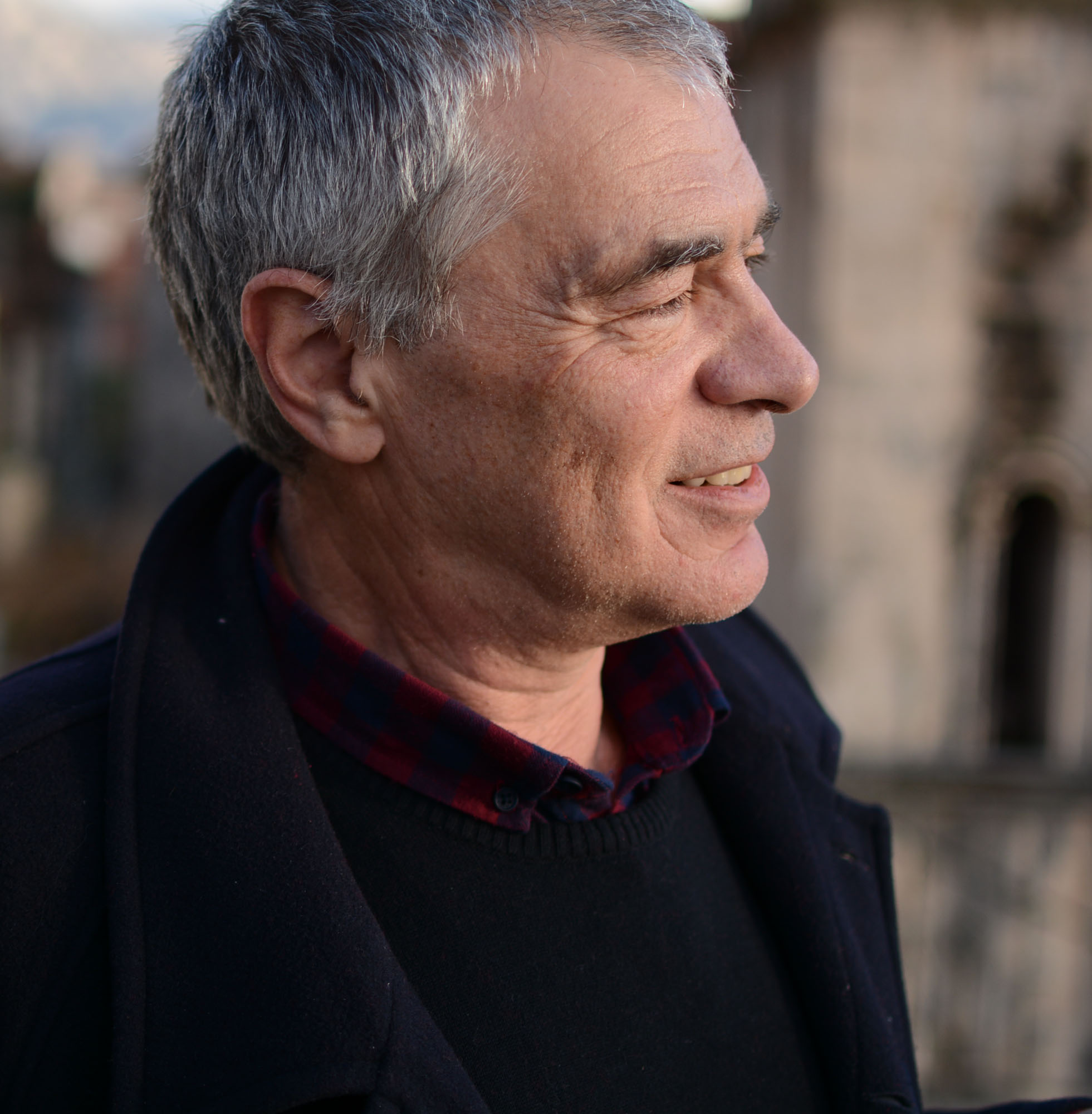
- Born: 27 January 1955; Moscow
- Died: 3 March 2023 (aged 68); Herceg Novi, Montenegro
- Education: Moscow Institute of Chemical Industry Machinery
- Occupations: social psychologist; anthropologist; chemical engineer; methodologist

Felix Shmidel (Hebrew: פליקם שמידל; 27 January 1955 - 3 March 2023) is an Israeli social psychologist, anthropologist, chemical engineer, and methodologist. Author of the theory of power relations, based on the method of formalized and structured thinking about human experience. He is a Doctor of Philosophy (1989).

== Biography ==
Born in Moscow, Russia on 27 January 1955, finished secondary school No. 17 in Mytishchi, Moscow Oblast, Russian Federation (1962–1972). Graduated from Moscow Institute of Chemical Industry Machinery (1972–1977). Chairman of the Council of Young Scholars of the All-Union Scientific-Research and Design Institute of Glass Industry Machinery (1982–1989). Member of the Expert Council of the Live Electronics of Russia national award (2010–2013).

=== Career ===
Places of work: the All-Union Scientific-Research and Design Institute of Synthetic Fiber (1977–1980; researcher), Capital Construction Board for Cultural Facilities of Moscow (1980–1983; engineer), the All-Union Scientific-Research and Design Institute of Glass Industry Machinery (1980–1990; researcher), Plasmasil scientific-research enterprise (1990–1993, Moscow; head of department), SP Geolink (1993–1998, Moscow; head of department), Borets compressor plant (1998–2000, deputy general director; 2006–2008, administrative director), OOO Retreyd (2001–2006, 2013–2015, Moscow; technical director), OOO Orgo System (2008–2012, Moscow; technical director). A citizen of Israel. Lived in Herceg Novi, Montenegro.

== Activity ==
=== Chemical engineering ===
In 1977–1998, F. Shmidel was engaged in research in plasma chemistry and processing of dispersive materials. He defended his thesis "Purification of quartz mineral raw materials by means of air classification method and plasma chemical treatment" (1989).

His research results were published in specialized scientific collections as well as in the specialist periodical Theoreticheskie Osnovy Khimicheskoy Tekhnologii magazine (published by the Kurnakov Institute of General and Inorganic Chemistry of the Russian Academy of Sciences). Participated in a number of conferences on chemical engineering, in particular, in the IV All-Union Symposium on Plasma Chemistry (Dnipropetrovsk, 1984), the VI All-Union Scientific and Technical Conference on Quartz Glass (Leningrad, 1987).

Author of patents "Method for separating powder by size" (USSR patent No. 1217494 dated 15 March 1986), "Method for separating powder into fractions" (USSR patent No. 1526845 dated 7 December 1989).

=== Methodology ===
In the field of methodology, Felix Shmidel developed his own Orgo system and a method of applying it to restore the manageability of companies. During 2000–2014, over 30 successful applications of the system took place. Among them are the oldest Russian compressor building company Borets compressor plant, the largest Russian mustard seed processing company Volgograd Mustard Oil Plant Sarepta, Pharmacy Chain 36.6, Veropharm pharmaceutical company, the Moscow Instrument-Making Plant Manometer.

Interviews include a publication in the Upravlenie Personalom journal. The results of his methodological research were published in particular in the Proizvodstvo Elektroniki journal (Moscow).

=== Social psychology ===
In the 2000s–2010s, Felix Shmidel published a number of articles on social psychology in scientific and popular journals, among which are Nezavisimiy Psikhiatricheskiy Zhurnal, and the Snob (Moscow).

Among his interviews for the mass media, there is a live interview with the journalist and man of letters Valery Panyushkin for his authorial program on the TV Rain channel (2010). During 2011–2012, he collaborated with the Vedomosti business newspaper (Moscow), where 26 of his articles were published. Publications in the Vedomosti caught the attention of the doctor of economics Anatoly Zhukov and his colleague Daria Khabarova, who afterwards analyzed them in their book.

=== "Philosophical treatises" ===
F. Shmidel's major works were published in Kyiv, Ukraine, where his three-volume "Philosophical treatises" (2019) saw the light. The first two volumes were published as separate books in Moscow (1999, 2012), and later the three books were combined into a single Kyiv edition. The three volumes deal with the issues of philosophical anthropology and social psychology.

The doctor of sciences Irina Remezova devoted a chapter of her book to considering the main ideas of the book "The metaphysics of meaning". As I. Remezova notes, F. Shmidel's true and productive unity of society is incompatible with a hostile attitude to the differences of another person; he contemplates a form of coexistence of subjects in which they are immersed directly into each other's existence.

His book "The will to joy" was reviewed by the literary critic Anna Kuznetsova in the Znamya magazine (Moscow). A. Kuznetsova emphasizes that F. Shmidel calls a person's feelings about the meaninglessness of existence forced (such that cannot be understood and just fill the consciousness). That is why he considers a person's longing to add a personal meaning to their life as a condition for living in joy.

The book "Power" was reviewed by Victoria Guseva on I-UA TV channel (Kyiv). Guseva notes that the book describes the picture of human relations world at the time when a reasonable human is transforming from a social product to a subject of parity compatibility.

== Literature ==
=== Books ===
1. Шмидель, Ф. Метафизика смысла. Москва : Carte Blanche, 1999. 160 с. ISBN 5-900504-17-4. 2nd ed.: Шмидель Ф. Философские трактаты. [Киев] : Exodus Creative Laboratory : [ArtHuss], 2019. Т. 1 : Метафизика смысла. 204 с. ISBN 978-617-7799-15-2. (in Russian)
2. Шмидель, Ф. Воля к радости. Москва : Новое литературное обозрение, 2012. 208 с. ISBN 978-5-86793-987-8. 2nd ed.: Шмидель Ф. Философские трактаты. [Киев] : Exodus Creative Laboratory : [ArtHuss], 2019. Т. 2 : Воля к радости. 256 с. ISBN 978-617-7799-16-9. (in Russian)
3. Шмидель, Ф. Философские трактаты. [Киев] : Exodus Creative Laboratory : [ArtHuss], 2019. Т. 3 : Власть. 232 с. ISBN 978-617-7799-17-6. (in Russian)

=== Articles ===
1. Shmidel, F. Phenomenology of improvements. Vedomosti. 15 September 2011. (in Russian)
2. Shmidel, F. Identity crisis. Vedomosti. 12 January 2012. (in Russian)
3. Shmidel, F. How to overcome the corporate style of common indifference. Vedomosti. 21 June 2012. (in Russian)
