= Yitzchok Tuvia Weiss =

British-Israeli Rabbi (1926–2022)

Rabbi Yitzchok Tuvia Weiss יצחק טוביה וייס
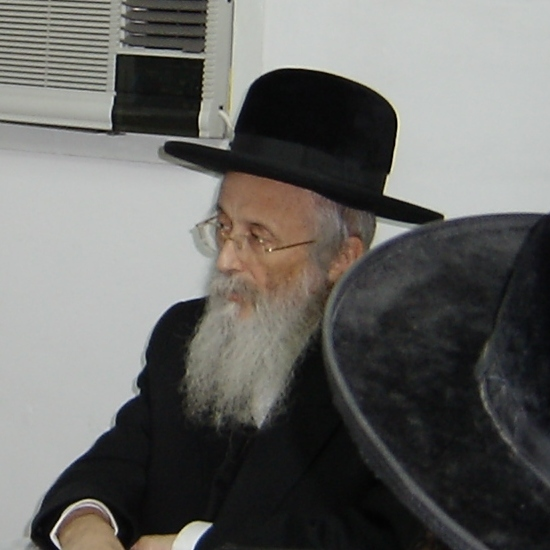

Personal life
- Born: Tibor Weiss; 26 August 1926 Pezinok, Slovakia
- Died: 30 July 2022 (aged 95) Jerusalem
- Parent(s): Shlomo and Rikel Weiss

Religious life
- Religion: Judaism

Jewish leader
- Predecessor: Yisroel Moshe Dushinsky
- Position: Ga'avad
- Organisation: Edah HaChareidis
- Began: 2003

Rabbi Yitzchok Tuvia Weiss (Hebrew: יצחק טוביה וייס; 26 August 1926 – 30 July 2022) was the Chief Rabbi and Grand Patriarch, or Ga'avad (Gaon Av Beis Din), of Jerusalem for the Edah HaChareidis. He was appointed to this post in 2003, after having served as a dayan, or Rabbinical Judge, of the Machzike Hadass community of Antwerp, Belgium. Weiss was a British national.

According to his brother, he was born in Pezinok, Slovakia as Tibor Weiss to Salomon (Shlomo) Weiss, a timber merchant. He attended the local secular school in the mornings, and took religious instruction with a private melamed in the afternoons.

Before World War II, at the age of 12, he escaped Slovakia on a Kindertransport, arranged by Aron Grünhut and Sir Nicholas Winton, leaving his parents and family behind. He arrived with the Kindertransport in London in late May 1939, after the Jewish holiday of Shavuos. He celebrated the Shabbos of his bar mitzvah at the home of a British woman who took him in. He received a set of tefillin, sent to him from his father through the Red Cross before he was murdered by Nazis. By the time the tefillin arrived, neither of his parents were alive. He was adopted by the Sassover Rebbe, Simcha Rubin of London.

Weiss continued his education at Yeshivas Toras Emes in Stamford Hill, London (also known as Schneider's Yeshiva), where he studied under Rabbi Moshe (Yehuda) Schneider. Another student at the yeshiva was Moshe Sternbuch, who served alongside him as the Ra'avad (Rosh Av Beis Din) of Jerusalem. After his marriage, he studied at the Gateshead Kollel under Rabbi Eliyahu Eliezer Dessler, who served as rosh kollel. After Dessler moved to Israel in the late 1940s, Weiss was appointed to serve as one of the executives of the Gateshead Kollel.

A few years later, Weiss moved to London, where he was hired as a maggid shiur at Yeshiva Horomo, led by Rabbi Elyokim Schlesinger, and as rabbi of the Tzeirei Agudas Yisroel shul (synagogue), known as "Upstairs 69". Later, he moved to Antwerp, where he served as a maggid shiur at a yeshiva in Wilrijk, and where he was appointed dayan in 1967. He also served, in an unofficial capacity, as the rabbi of the Gerrer Shtiebel, and the Yingerleit Shul in Antwerp.

== Edah HaChareidis ==
Weiss became the Grand Patriarch of the Edah HaChareidis in 2003. When he accepted his new role as Ga'avad, he also adopted the traditional Jerusalem mode of dress.

In 2019, a collection of Weiss' novellae on the books of Genesis and Exodus was published, titled Shaarei Tuviah.

When the Israeli government first came out with certain restrictions on citizens to protect the country from the coronavirus pandemic, such as limiting prayer quorums and other large gatherings of people, Weiss opposed those decisions, but retracted soon after.

On 2 April 2020 he was diagnosed with COVID-19 after being admitted to Jerusalem's Hadassah Ein Kerem Hospital on the previous day with high fever and low blood pressure, and on 5 April he was released after his condition improved.

Weiss died on 30 July 2022, at the age of 95.
