= Moshe Sternbuch =

British-born Israeli Haredi rabbi (born 1926)

Rabbi Moshe Sternbuch משה שטרנבוך
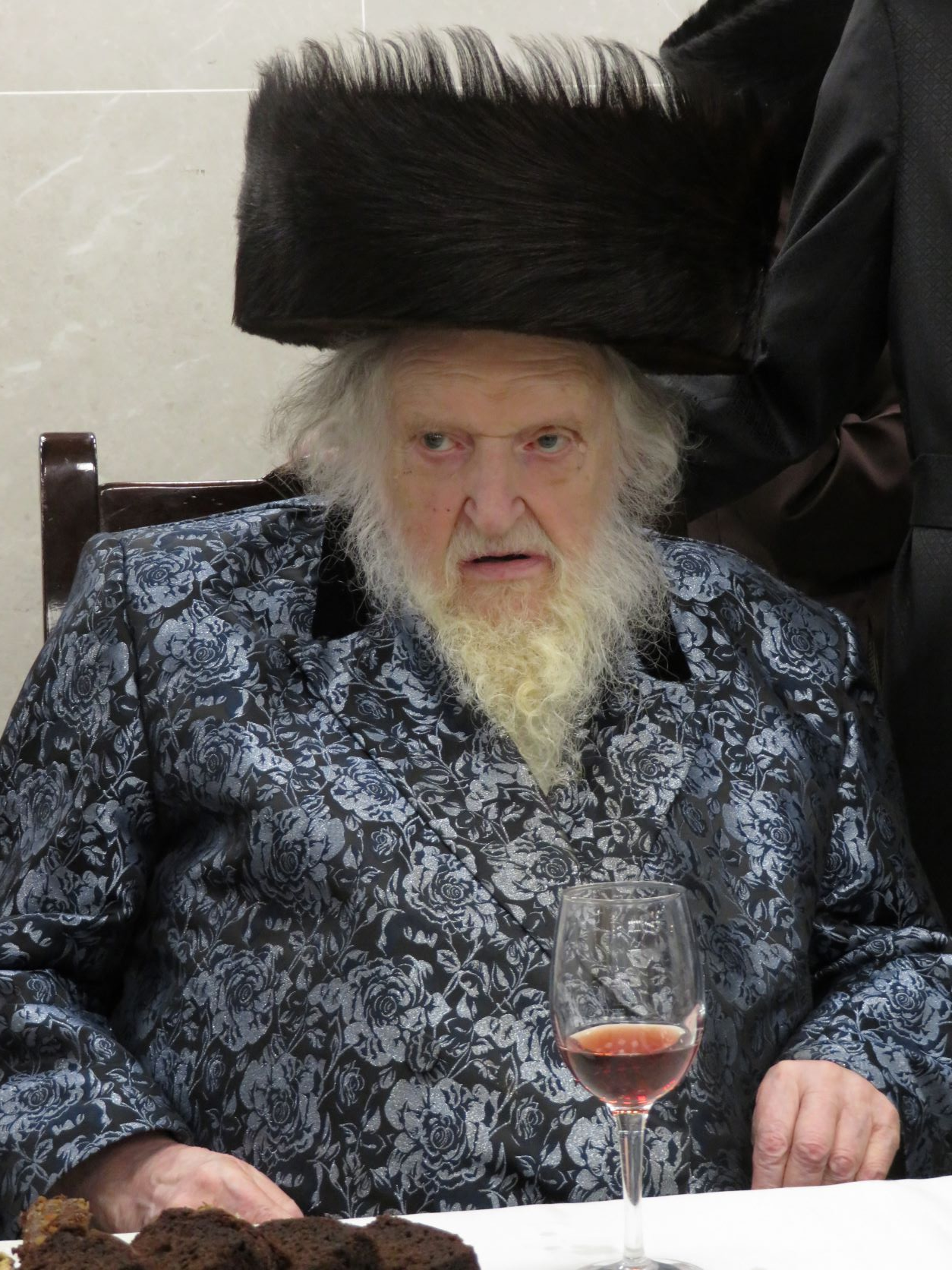

Personal life
- Born: 15 February 1926 (age 100) London, England
- Parent: Osher Sternbuch

Religious life
- Religion: Judaism
- Denomination: Haredi Judaism

Jewish leader
- Synagogue: Gra Shul of Har Nof, Jerusalem
- Organization: Edah HaChareidis
- Residence: Har Nof, Jerusalem

Moshe Sternbuch (Hebrew: משה שטרנבוך; born 15 February 1926) is a British-born Israeli Haredi (ultra-Orthodox) rabbi. He is the de facto supreme rabbinic figure of the Edah HaChareidis in Jerusalem, and the rabbi of the Gra Synagogue in the Har Nof neighbourhood.

== Biography ==
Moshe Sternbuch was born in London on 15 February 1926, one of nine children of Osher Sternbuch, an Orthodox Jewish merchant, and Devorah. His parents hosted numerous rabbis who came to London to raise money for their yeshivas, among them Elchonon Wasserman, who after learning with Sternbuch declared that he was a davar sheyeish bo mamash (a boy of substance). He was tested in learning every Shabbat by Yechezkel Abramsky, who predicted he would one day become a moreh hora'ah (posek). Before long he was known as the Londoner Illui (prodigy).

Osher died in 1939 at the age of 39, leaving behind his eldest child of 18 years, the 10-year-old Sternbuch, and the youngest, who was only 2 years old. In 1940, he entered the Toras Emes yeshiva in Stamford Hill, of which Moshe Schneider was the rosh yeshiva, where he would remain for ten years. He studied there with Bezalel Rakow, who would later become the Gateshead Rov, Yitzchok Tuvia Weiss, his future colleague in the Edah HaChareidis, and future Olympia and York businessman Paul Reichmann.

Sternbuch's family fled London during World War II due to The Blitz. They moved to a small nearby village where he shared a room with Eliyahu Eliezer Dessler, author of Michtav me-Eliyahu, who predicted that Sternbuch would someday be one of the gedolei hador (greatest of the generation). Due to the increasing threat of a Nazi invasion of Britain, Sternbuch's mother attempted to arrange his safe passage to Canada or the United States. She asked Elyah Lopian, a rosh yeshiva from the East End of London, for advice on whether or not to allow her son to board the ship. He offered to perform a ceremony which included fasting in order to help her reach a decision. In the end, the ship departed without Sternbuch and sank with all 300 children aboard.

In 1954, R'Sternbuch married the daughter of Yaakov Schechter, an acquaintance of Avrohom Yeshaya Karelitz (the Chazon Ish). Meshulam Dovid Soloveitchik and Chanoch Ehrentreu were his brothers-in-law.

In 2026, Sternbuch received congratulations from King Charles III upon turning 100 years old.

Sternbuch resides in the Har Nof neighbourhood of Jerusalem, where he is the rabbi of the local Gra Synagogue, named after the Vilna Gaon of whom he is a direct descendant. His aunt was Recha Sternbuch, who was involved in rescuing Jews during the Holocaust in Switzerland.

== Rabbinic career ==
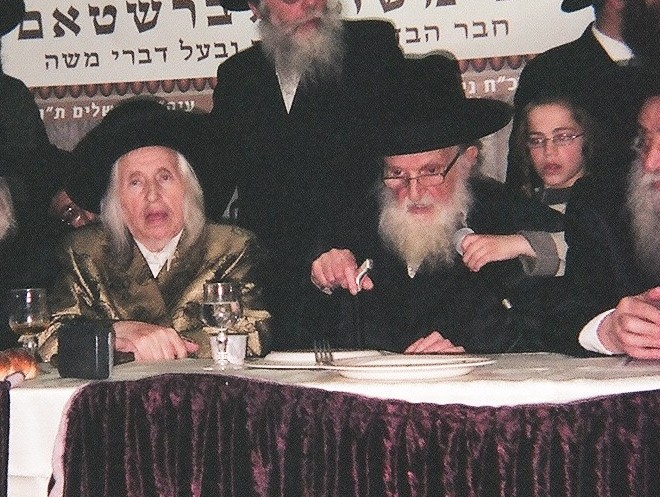
Moshe Sternbuch, seated, with the Kaliver Rebbe to his right

After the war, Sternbuch immigrated to Israel in order to study Torah and be in close proximity to Rabbi Yitzchok Zev Soloveitchik. He enrolled in the Hebron Yeshiva, and cultivated relationships with Soloveitchik, the Chazon Ish and Rabbi Dov Berish Weidenfeld, with whom he used to meet regularly in their homes.

After his marriage in 1954, Sternbuch moved to an apartment in Jerusalem next to Soloveitchik. He was appointed rosh yeshiva of Yeshivat Hamasmidim. In 1960, after Soloveitchik's death, the family moved to Bnei Brak, where they resided for the next 20 years. Rabbi Yechezkel Abramsky encouraged Sternbuch to devote himself to strengthening Torah study in Rosh HaAyin, a nearby town with a substantial Yemenite Jewish immigrant population. Forgoing an opportunity to establish an elite kollel in Bnei Brak, he established one in Rosh HaAyin and founded Beit Olot, a home for immigrant Mizrahi girls on the model of Bayit L'Pleitot, a similar home for Ashkenazi girls.

In 1980, Sternbuch took up a position in Johannesburg, South Africa. He was involved in outreach there, including giving lectures to medical professionals. When he later moved to Jerusalem, many of these South Africans joined him in his new location in Har Nof.

Starting in 2003, Sternbuch served as Ra'avad (Head of Court) of the Edah HaChareidis in Jerusalem. On July 20, 2023, Elyakim Schlesinger – a senior rabbi in London not affiliated with the Edah – declared Sternbuch as ga'avad (Gaon Av Beis Din) of the Edah HaChareidis via broadcast, succeeding Yitzchok Tuvia Weiss who died exactly one year prior. This action was done in defiance of the Va'ad HaPoel (lit. 'Acting Committee'), which had refrained from taking this step in the immediate aftermath of Weiss' death so as not to anger right-wing elements in the Edah still bristling at Sternbuch's disagreement with Weiss over the permissibility of using a former burial ground as a housing development in Beit Shemesh. Following the controversial ceremony, which was held in the Dushinsky synagogue in Jerusalem, the administration of the Edah HaChareidis immediately released a statement declaring that "as always Rabbis will only be appointed by the Administration and Community Leaders", and in the course of time twice issued the statement "there is currently no Gaavad".

== Views and opinions ==
Sternbuch opposes Zionism and the State of Israel.

In 2013, a new housing development under construction in the Ramat Avraham neighbourhood of Beit Shemesh was found to be situated atop an ancient burial ground. Since Jewish law forbids the desecration of cemeteries, the project was put on hold pending an investigation. Sternbuch ruled, through his Agudat Eretz HaHayim burial society, that it was permissible to investigate the remains. This decision led to resumption of the construction work. However, the competing organisation Asra Kadisha, led by Weiss, determined that all construction on the site must be halted immediately, with the area to be left permanently abandoned. After the latter's ruling was ignored, rioting ensued in Ramat Avraham on the part of Haredi residents from Ramat Beit Shemesh Bet and Mea Shearim.

In September 2018, Sternbuch criticized British Chief Rabbi Ephraim Mirvis for publishing an educational pamphlet warning against LGBT bullying in Orthodox schools. Sternbuch viewed this as advocacy for the LGBT lifestyle.

== Bibliography ==
- Frankfurter, Yitzchok (28 March 2018). "From One Generation to Another: A Conversation with the Renowned Posek and Rosh Beis Din of Yerushalayim Rav Moshe Sternbuch". Ami Magazine. No. 361. pp. 42–68.
