= Gedaliah Nadel =

Israeli Haredi rabbi

Rabbi Gedalia Nadel הרב גדליה נדל
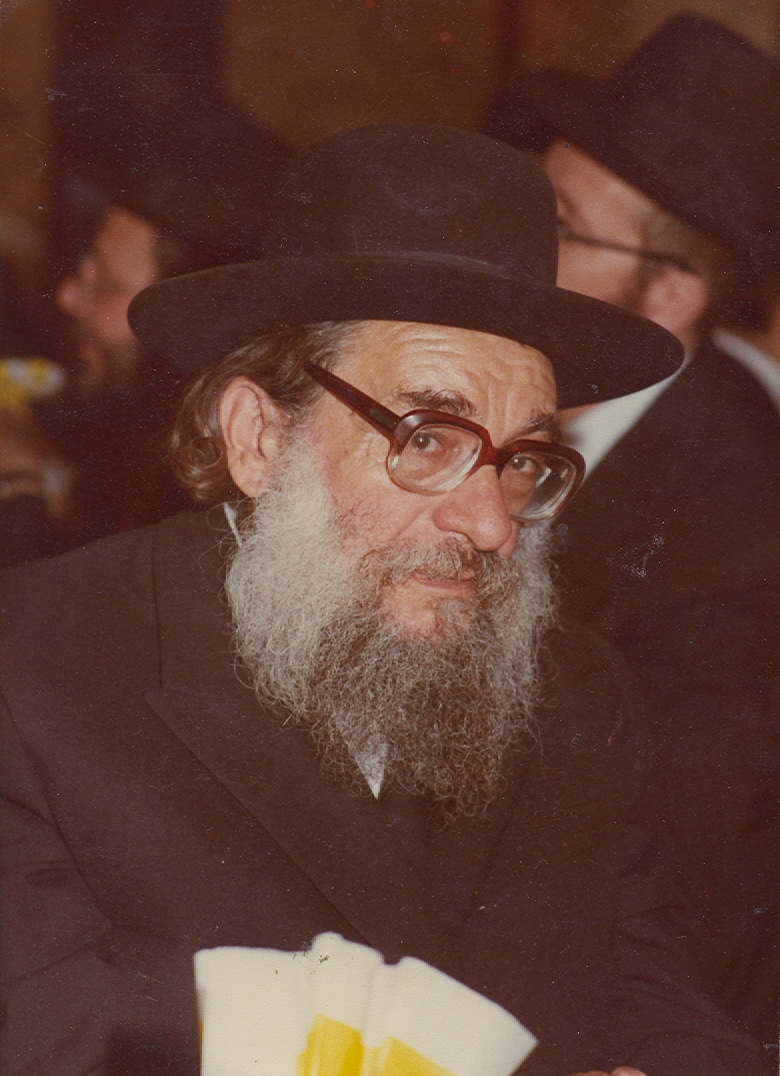
- Rabbi Gedalia Nadel

Personal life
- Born: 1923 Šiauliai, Lithuania
- Died: June 5, 2004 (aged 81) Bnei Brak, Israel
- Buried: Ponevezh Yeshiva Cemetery, Bnei Brak
- Spouse: Sarah Rachel Weiner
- Children: 9
- Parent(s): Reuven Heshel and Nechama Nadel

Religious life
- Religion: Judaism
- Denomination: Haredi

Jewish leader
- Position: Rosh yeshiva
- Yeshiva: Vizhnitz Yeshiva
- Other: Instructor at Kollel Chazon Ish

Gedaliah Nadel (Hebrew: גדליה נדל; 1923–2004) was an influential rabbi in Israel's Haredi community, and a close disciple of the Chazon Ish. He was one of the heads of Kollel Chazon Ish and was the leading authority of Jewish Law in the Chazon Ish neighbourhood of Bnei Brak. He was an expert in all facets of Torah and Talmudic knowledge.

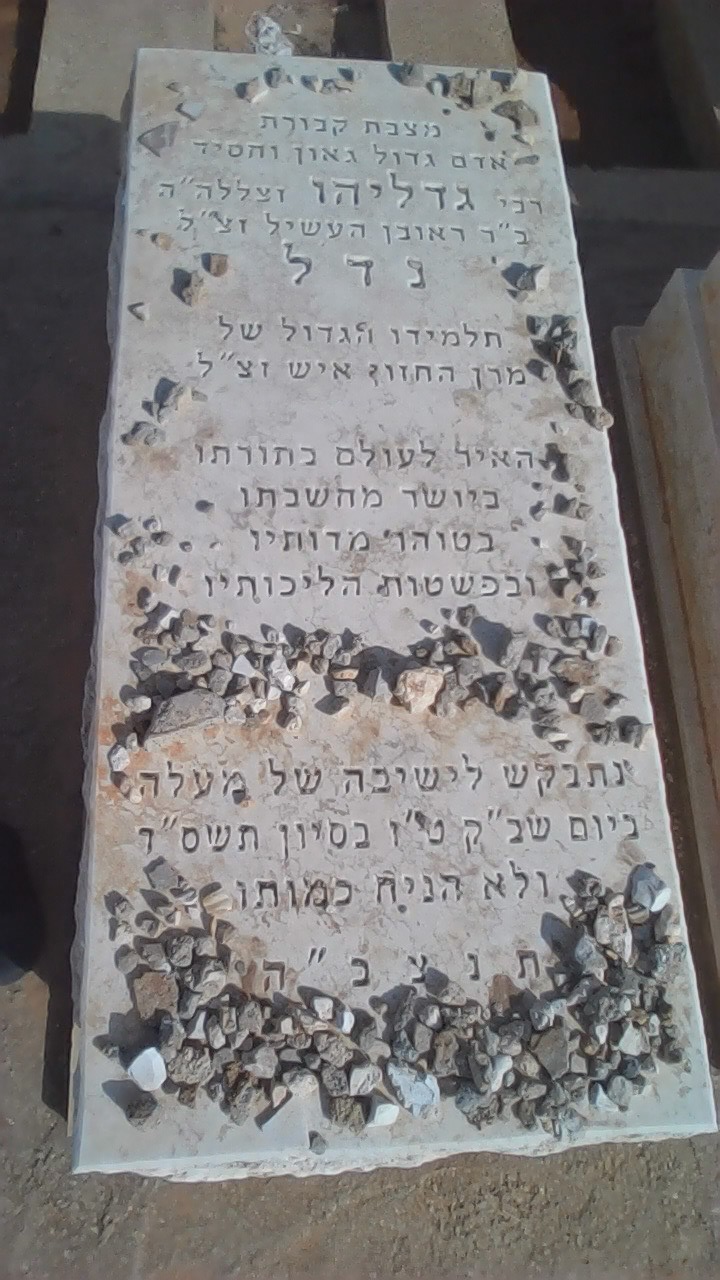
Nadel's grave with visitation stones

== Biography ==
Nadel was born in Šiauliai, Lithuania, to Reuven Heshel and Nechama Nadel. In 1937, at age 14, he immigrated to Mandatory Palestine with his family, who settled in Balfouria, where his father received a plot of land. As a child, Gedaliah was known for his diligence and devotion to studying Torah, reportedly studying for up to eighteen consecutive hours. Rabbi Reuven Trop visited the settlement and suggested that Nadel’s father send him to Heichal HaTorah Yeshiva in Tel Aviv. There, under the influence of Rabbi Yehoshua Yagel, he grew close to the Chazon Ish, visiting him weekly on Fridays to discuss learning. The Chazon Ish moulded him into his principal student. After completing his studies at Heichal HaTorah, he joined Lomza Yeshiva in Petah Tikva, where he studied under Rabbi Elazar Menachem Man Shach and became close to him.

Rabbi Nadel married Sarah Rachel, daughter of Rabbi Eliyahu Yehoshua Weiner, a disciple of the Chofetz Chaim. After his marriage, Nadel lived in Jerusalem, close to his father-in-law, and developed connections with Rabbi Shimshon Aharon Polonsky and the Brisker Rav. Later, he moved to Bnei Brak and served as a teacher at Yeshivat Beit Yisrael v'Damasek Eliezer, affiliated with Vizhnitz Hasidism.

During the 1948 Arab-Israeli War, Nadel joined the IDF, declaring it a milhemet mitzvah. However, following the Altalena Affair, he deserted, citing concerns over the leadership of the army. He also sought to enlist during the Six-Day War.

He became Rosh Yeshiva (dean) at Yeshivat Beit Yisrael v'Damasek Eliezer, and later became a senior instructor at Kollel Chazon Ish.

RaNadel's approach emphasized a logical and straightforward interpretation, as espoused by the Chazon Ish. He studied works generally not included in the litvak curriculum, such as Hasidic and philosophical texts. Despite his intellectual freedom, he maintained a radical and zealous stance on community issues. He abstained from voting in Israeli legislative elections and was one of the signatories against the National Service law for women.

Nadel would learn Maimonides' Guide for the Perplexed immediately after praying Shacharis vatikin. Rabbi Nadel was left with nine children, none of whom were married at the time.

In the 1970s he began to delve into philosophical and secular literature, developing unconventional views, such as on Judaism and evolution. He proposed that Adam the father of Seth was different from the "Adam" who fathered Cain and Abel, and accepted the scientific age of the universe, contrary to traditional creationist beliefs.

== Family ==
Nadel had nine children.

== Writings ==
Rabbi Nadel did not publish his writings. His students compiled two volumes titled Hiddushei R’ Gedalia (Bnei Brak, 2001), and a booklet titled Shiurei R’ Gedalia. After his death, Rabbi Yitzchak Sheilat published BeTorato Shel R’ Gedalia with complete transcriptions of his teachings. The book faced opposition from his family and certain rabbis who were concerned about preserving his legacy.

B'Torato Shel Rav Gedaliah was banned by three prominent Bnei Barak rabbis because it supported Darwin's theory of evolution, including sentences such as:

"Regarding [the idea that] the creation of man in the image of God marked the end of a long process which started with a non-cognizant animal which gradually evolved until this creature was given a human mind... this is an accurate description. Darwin's proofs, and those of geologists, for the existence of early stages of mankind, seem convincing."

B'Torato Shel Rav Gedaliah is a compilation of teachings prepared, which, according to the book, is taken from Nadel's audio recordings and published at his request. It was published by Rabbi Yitzchak Sheilat, one of Nadel's main students, and at the personal request of Nadel.

In 5772 (or 2010/2011 CE), Sheilat published a new edition.

Rabbi Nadel’s son-in-law, Rabbi Dovid Levi, authored several works influenced by Nadel’s teachings, including the "Derech Dovid" series on various Torah topics.
