= Canada Park =

National park in the Occupied West Bank

Coordinates: 31°50′19″N 34°59′52″E

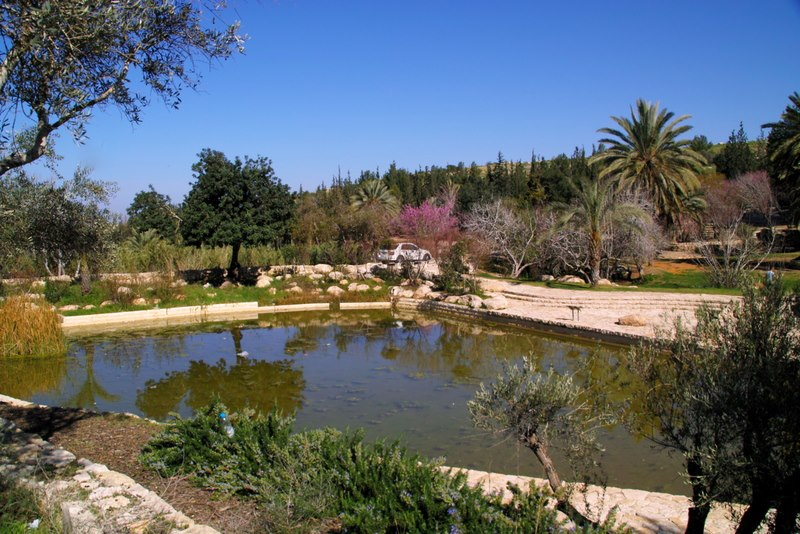
Canada Park

Canada Park (Hebrew: פארק קנדה, Arabic: حديقة كندا, also Ayalon Park) is a national park stretching over 7,000 dunams (7 km^{2}) in the Israeli-occupied West Bank. The park is located north of Highway 1 (Tel Aviv–Jerusalem), and is situated near the Ayalon Valley, between the Latrun Interchange and Sha'ar HaGai. It was established following the ethnic cleansing of the ancient Palestinian villages of Yalu, Bayt Nuba and Imwas by Israeli troops during the Six-Day War.

Today, the park is full with natural attractions, including man-made forests, Mediterranean woodlands home to many local flowers, and the remains of ancient orchards. The park also has a number of historical interest, including a Hasmonean Jewish fort, burial caves and ritual baths of the Second Temple period and the Bar Kokhba revolt, a Crusader fort, a Roman bathhouse that was turned into a maqam, the remnants of the three depopulated Palestinian villages, and various military memorials. There are also recreation areas, springs, and panoramic several hilltop views.

Canada Park is considered a popular tourist destination for Israelis, drawing some 300,000 visitors annually.

The park was heavily damaged in the 2025 Israel–West Bank fires.

== Features ==
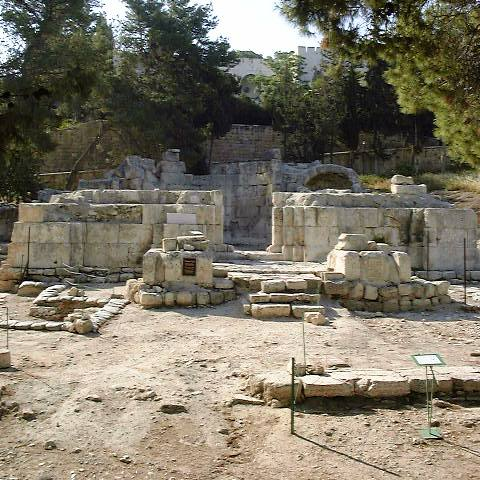
Ruins of Byzantine church, Canada Park

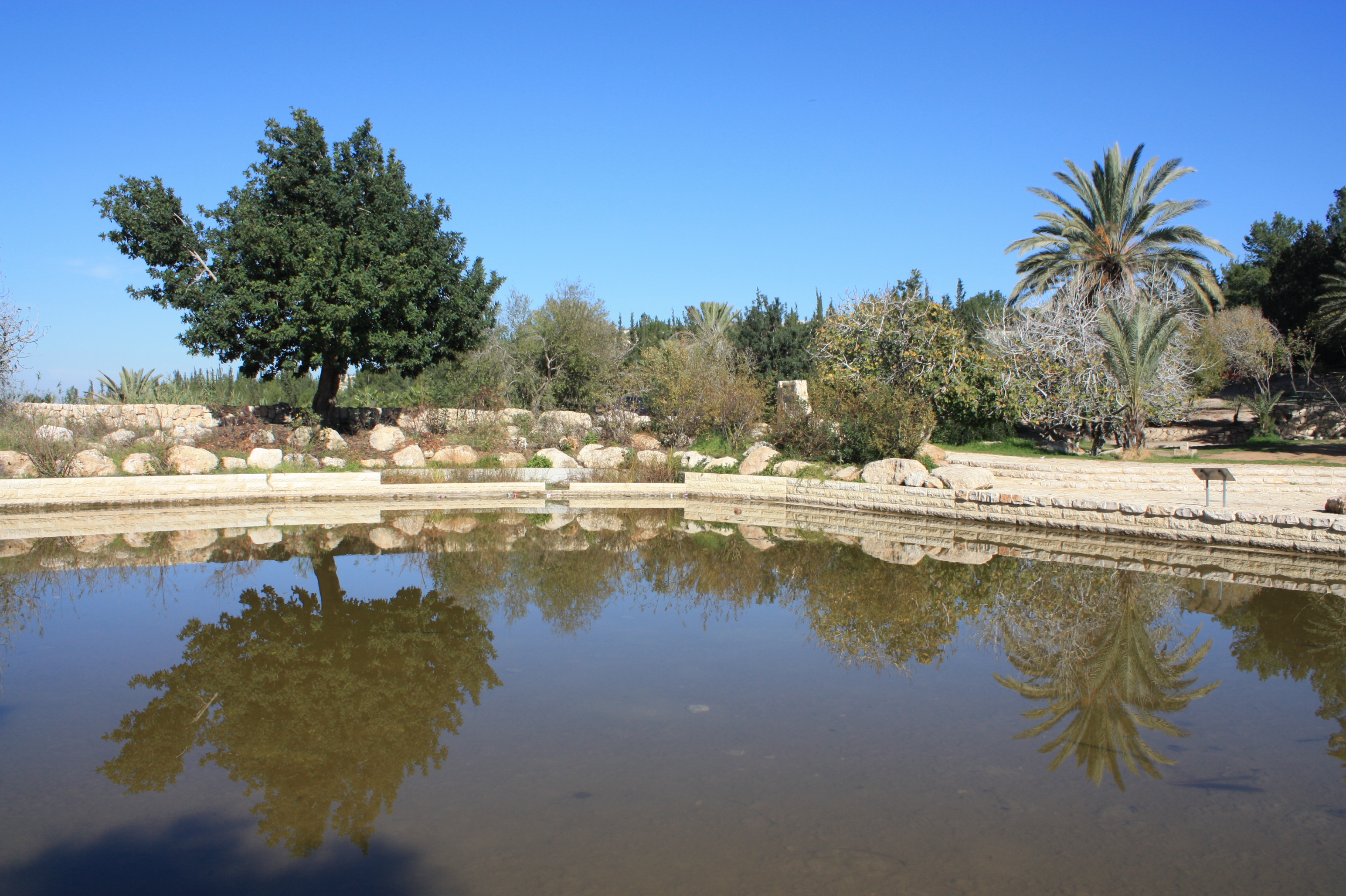
Lake in Canada Park

Canada Park covers an area of 7,000 dunams. It is filled with wooded areas, walking trails, water features and archaeological sites. Trees in the park include olive, carob, pomegranate, pine and almond. The area is also home to a range of wildlife from lizards and turtles to gray ravens and blue jays.

Historical ruins on the grounds of the park include a Roman bathhouse, a Hasmonean Jewish cemetery, and a Crusader fortress (Castellum Arnaldi). Two Second Temple period mikvehs, a type of Jewish ritual bath, were also discovered there. At the foot of one of the hills that overlooks the city of Modi'in is a large reservoir built by the Jewish National Fund for irrigating local fields.

In the middle of the park is a forest planted to commemorate over 300 American and Canadian Jews who died in Israel's wars or were victims of terror. An annual memorial ceremony is organized by the Association of Americans and Canadians in Israel (AACI). In 2011, the ceremony was attended by the US Ambassador to Israel Daniel Shapiro.

== Establishment ==
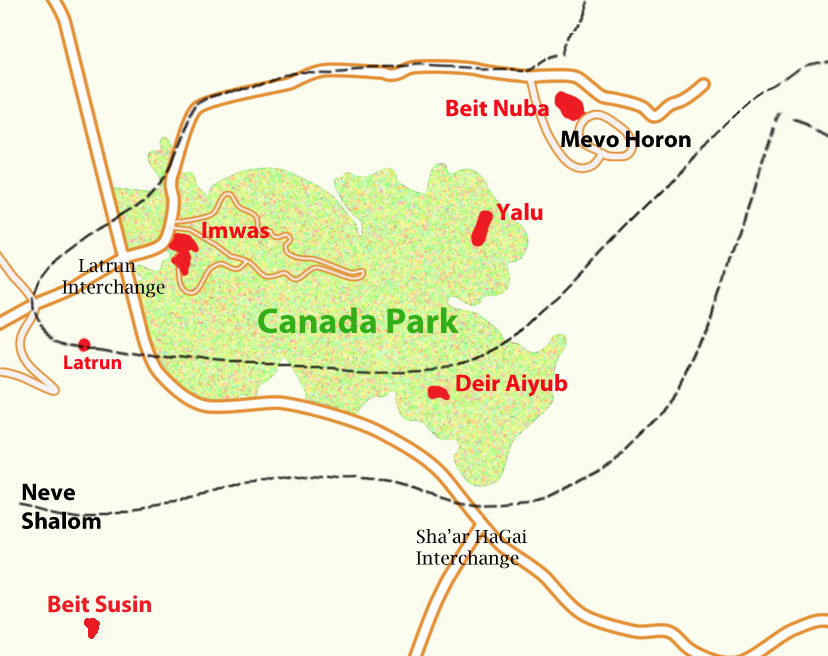
Map of destroyed villages and armistice lines

After capturing the area in 1967 during the Six-Day War, Israel took over the Palestinian villages in the area, which were then razed on the orders of Israeli general Yitzhak Rabin, with 7,000–10,000 inhabitants expelled and 1,464 homes demolished. Imwas, Yalo and Bayt Nuba were demolished as part of strategic plans to widen the Jerusalem corridor. Dayr Ayyub, also on the grounds of the park, had been partly destroyed during the fighting in 1948 and never rebuilt.

=== Canadian funding ===
In 1972, Bernard Bloomfield of Montreal, then President of JNF Canada, spearheaded a campaign among the Canadian Jewish community to raise $15 million ($80m in terms of 2010 values) for the park's establishment. The road leading to the park is named for John Diefenbaker, the former Canadian prime minister, who opened it in 1975. The project was completed in 1984.

== Residents' request to return ==
The inhabitants were offered compensation but not allowed to return. The lands of the 3 villages were confiscated and declared a closed area, and only declared 'public land' to be developed for a recreational park two years later in 1969. The settlement of Mevo Horon was built on the lands of Bayt Nuba in 1970. Signage in the park indicates that it falls under the Department of Archaeology, Civil Administration of Judea and Samaria, Judea and Samaria being the Israeli terms for the West Bank.

In 1976, Palestinian residents of Imwas, Yalo and Beit Nouba wrote to the Israeli prime minister Yitzhak Rabin asking for what they described as their "legitimate humanitarian right to return to the villages from which we were driven and expelled" in order to rebuild their houses without requesting compensation from Israel. They did not receive a reply. In 2007, the Israeli NGO Zochrot wrote to Israel's minister of defense, Ehud Barak, on behalf of the residents to ask why they could not return to their homes. In 2008, the minister's office informed them that "The return of the village inhabitants [was] not allowed for security considerations".

In 2013, the Palestinian National Authority's Negotiations Affairs Department launched a campaign to have the 50-km (30 mile) Latrun Valley, contiguous to the Green Line, restored to it as 'vital and integral part of the State of Palestine as defined by the 1967 border.

== Criticism ==
According to former Israel parliamentarian Uri Avnery, the creation of the park was tantamount to complicity in ethnic cleansing, and Canadian involvement in its creation a "cover to a war crime". According to Meron Benvenisti the function of such re-afforestation projects like that at Canada Park was to confiscate Arab land in the Palestinian territories Israel occupied after 1967.

The JNF's reafforestation programme privileges pine over indigenous species, and, according to Ilan Pappé, the choice of planting a forest based on fast-growing species was dictated by considerations of rapidly hindering a return of refugees to their land, while, as evergreens, quickly concealing the demolished village sites with year round leafage.

== See also ==
- Ajalon
- Emmaus Nicopolis
- Horvat 'Eqed
- List of national parks and nature reserves of Israel

== Bibliography ==
- Benvenisti, Meron (1986). Conflicts and contradictions. Villard. p. 200. ISBN 978-0-394-53647-7.
- Benveniśtî, Mêrôn (2000). Sacred landscape: the buried history of the Holy Land since 1948 (Illustrated ed.). University of California Press. ISBN 0-520-21154-5.
- Brynen, Rex; El-Rifai, Roula (2007). Palestinian Refugees Challenges of Repatriation and Development: challenges of repatriation and development. Canada: International Development Research Centre. ISBN 978-1-55250-231-0.
- Colombo, John Robert (2001). 1000 questions about Canada: places, people, things, and ideas : a question-and-answer book on Canadian facts and culture. Dundurn Press Ltd. ISBN 978-0-88882-232-1.
- Cook, Jonathan (10 March 2009). "Israeli park a lesson in forgotten history". The National.
- Cook, Jonathan (18 June 2009). "Canadian ambassador honoured at illegal park". The National.
- Davis, Uri (24 September 2004). "Apartheid Israel and the Jewish National Fund of Canada: The Story of 'Imwas, Yalu, Beit Nuba and Canada Park". Address at Carleton University, Ottawa.
- Hepburn, Bob (6 October 1991). "Wiped Off The Map". The Toronto Star.
- David Newman, Clive Schofield (1995). Boundaries in Flux: The 'Green Line' Boundary Between Israel and the West Bank - Past, Present and Future. IBRU. ISBN 978-1-897643-25-9.
- Oren, M. (2002). Six Days of War. Oxford University Press. p. 307. ISBN 0-19-515174-7.
- Swedenburg, Ted (2003). Memories of revolt: the 1936-1939 rebellion and the Palestinian national past. University of Arkansas Press. ISBN 978-1-55728-763-2.
- Winter, Dave (2000). Israel Handbook: With the Palestinian Authority Areas. Canada: Footprint Handbooks. ISBN 1-900949-48-2.
