= 2025 Israel–West Bank fires =

2025 wildfires in Israel and the Israeli-occupied West Bank

- Date: April 30, 2025; 17 months ago
- Location: Israel and the West Bank, Palestine

Statistics
- Burned area: 25,000 dunams (25 km^{2}; 9.7 sq mi)

Impacts
- Injuries: 45+
- Evacuated: 10,000+
- Cost: Tens of millions of shekels

On 30 April 2025, Israel and the Israeli-occupied West Bank experienced major fires in more than 100 different locations through the Judaean Mountains area. Israel requested help with extinguishing the fires from neighboring countries, declared a national emergency and deployed IDF troops to help extinguish the fires. Additionally, communities located about 30 kilometres (19 mi) west of Jerusalem, including Neve Shalom, Beko'a, Ta'oz, Mevo Horon, Mishmar Ayalon and Nahshon were evacuated, and at least 45 people have been injured.

TV footage showed fires along the highway and people abandoning their cars and running from the fires. Additionally, the two main highways from and to Jerusalem, Highway 1 and Highway 3 were closed.

The fires spread quickly within a few days, mostly through forests and areas west of Jerusalem, leading Israel to seek international aid.

== Background ==
The wildfire season in Israel coincides with the dry season, normally between April and November, with virtually no natural fires reported and most ignition points due to human activity. Wildfires are a common phenomenon in the Jerusalem Mountains. Between 1987 and 2009, approximately 4,000 wildfire incidents occurred in the region, although most of them affected areas smaller than 100 dunams (0.1 square kilometres (0.039 sq mi)). According to estimates, a large wildfire, defined as one damaging at least 6,000 dunams, occurs on average once every 12 years, while fires affecting around 1,500 dunams occur approximately once every four years. The last major wildfire in the area occurred in 2021.

After the major wildfires in California in January 2025, fire officials noted Israel's lack of manpower to handle a major wildfire, as their fire teams could only employ one firefighter for every 4,500 residents. A 2023 report by the Knesset Research and Information Center highlighted a manpower shortage, noting that only 123 fire stations existed out of the 150 required, and just 2,400 firefighters were employed compared to the 3,366 needed.

In the days preceding the fire, the Israel Meteorological Service warned that the Jerusalem hills area was at severe risk of wildfires. As a precaution, the Israel Fire and Rescue Services deployed forces on standby and prohibited lighting fires in open areas, although other relevant agencies did not take similar measures. A week earlier, on 23 April, at around 11:00 a.m., a wildfire broke out in the area causing the moshavs of Eshtaol, Mesilat Zion and Beit Meir to be evacuated and Highways 1, 38 and 44 to be intermittently closed to traffic. Approximately 110 fire crews and 11 firefighting aircraft and a helicopter were operating. The next day, the fire was brought under control. Approximately 70 fire crews and 6 firefighting aircraft from the Elad Squadron were working to fight the fire. According to the Israel Nature and Parks Authority, approximately 10,000 dunams burned.

== Fires ==
On the morning of 30 April 2025, Israel's Memorial Day for fallen soldiers (Yom HaZikaron), a wildfire broke out between Eshtaol and Latrun, in the outskirts of Jerusalem, and spread rapidly. Israeli authorities identified Neve Shalom as the epicenter of the fire and identified five other major points: Highway 3, Canada Park, Mesilat Zion, Harel, and Ramat Beit Shemesh. According to Shmulik Friedman, the commander of the Jerusalem District of the Israel Fire and Rescue Services, a fire erupted near Mesalit Zion at approximately 9:30 a.m. and spread west due to strong winds before moving eastward. He also stated that the fires were possibly the largest in Israel's history and were far from containment. By night, the Jewish National Fund (JNF) estimated that around 11,700 dunams were burned by the fire, with Canada Park almost entirely engulfed in flames.

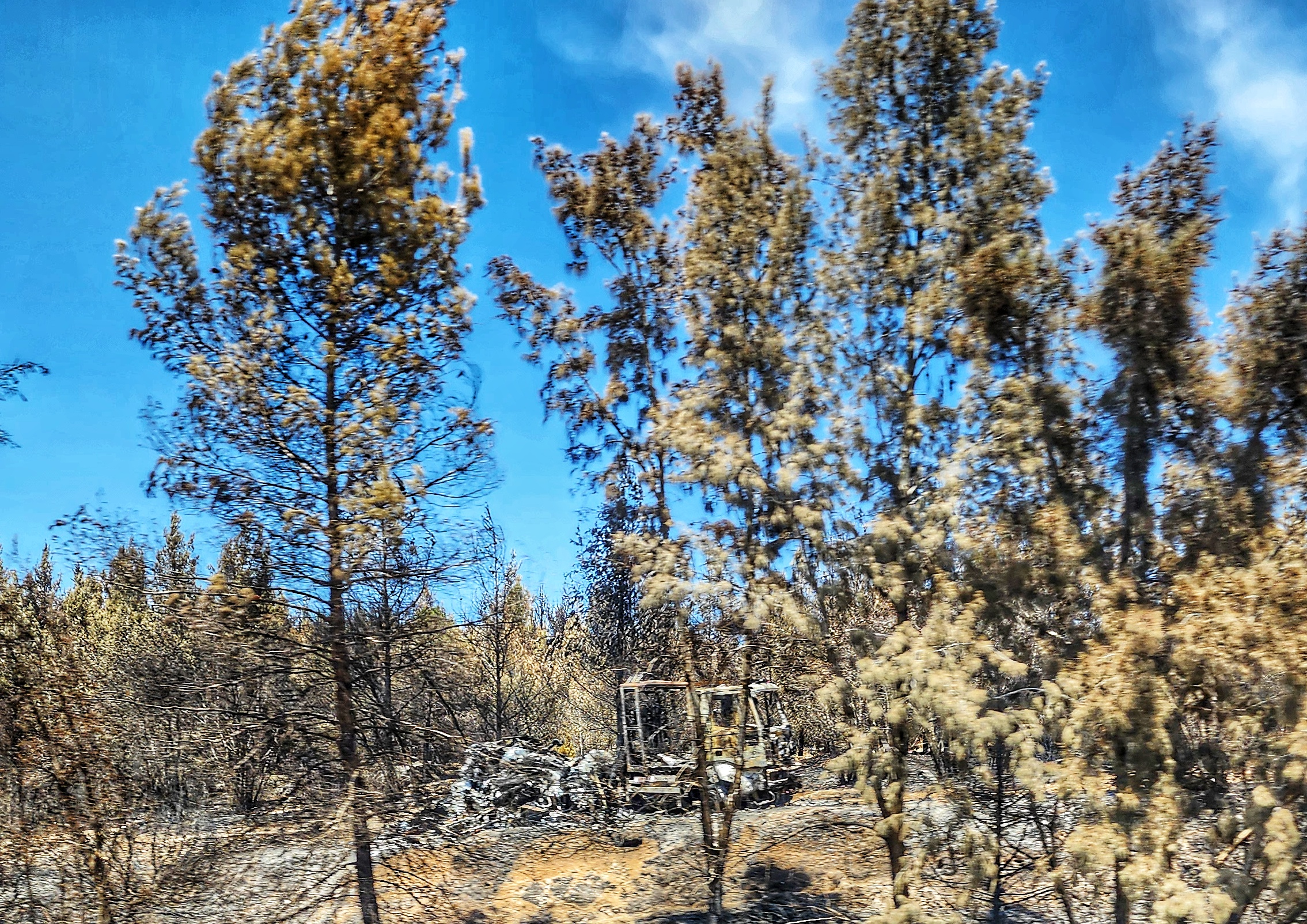
Burnt truck near Latrun after 30 April 2025 wildfire

Footage on social media displayed thick smoke in the air along Highway 1, a key highway that connects Jerusalem and Tel Aviv. At least nine people were rescued from their cars, and many other drivers abandoned their vehicles and fled on foot. Three empty cars and a truck caught on fire. Fires also burned on a hillside near the city of Modi'in, as well as around decommissioned tanks at the Yad La-Shiryon Armored Corps Memorial Site and Museum in Latrun. Flames were filmed approaching a Catholic monastery, although the Latin Patriarchate of Jerusalem stated on 30 April that it was too early to assess if damage had occurred. A military base was engulfed by fire, trapping soldiers. Fires were later reported at open areas in Petah Tikva.

Initially, winds as high as 40 miles per hour (64 km/h) caused the fire to spread quickly. Wind speeds were expected to increase to between 90 kilometres per hour (56 mph) and 100 kilometres per hour (62 mph) later in the day. Prime Minister Benjamin Netanyahu claimed that the fire was exacerbated by a "deadly combination" of dryness and strong winds. He also warned that the winds "can push the fire easily towards the outskirts of [Jerusalem] – and even into the city itself". High temperatures and extremely dry foliage following a mild winter contributed to its spread. Many regions experienced temperatures between 36 °C (97 °F) and 39 °C (102 °F), while humidity dropped below 10%. Rain showers occurred in areas such as the western Negev desert, but overall rainfall was too insufficient to put out the fires. Winds also gusted in excess of 95 km/h (60 mph), temporarily grounding firefighting aircraft.

By approximately 5 p.m. IDT the following day, five fire sectors were active. Seventy-six fire and rescue teams, reinforced by four firefighting aircraft and 40 ATVs, were operating at that time in the five sectors. Later that day, on 6:22 p.m. IDT, the fire was declared under control. By the end of the day, firefighting crews were still working to contain a few smaller, controlled fire sectors, mainly in the Givat Washington area.

The initial wildfires came to an end on 2 May 2025, after burning more than 25,000 dunams in total. A day after, on 3 May 2025, another fire broke out in the Ben Shemen Forest area.

== Emergency response ==
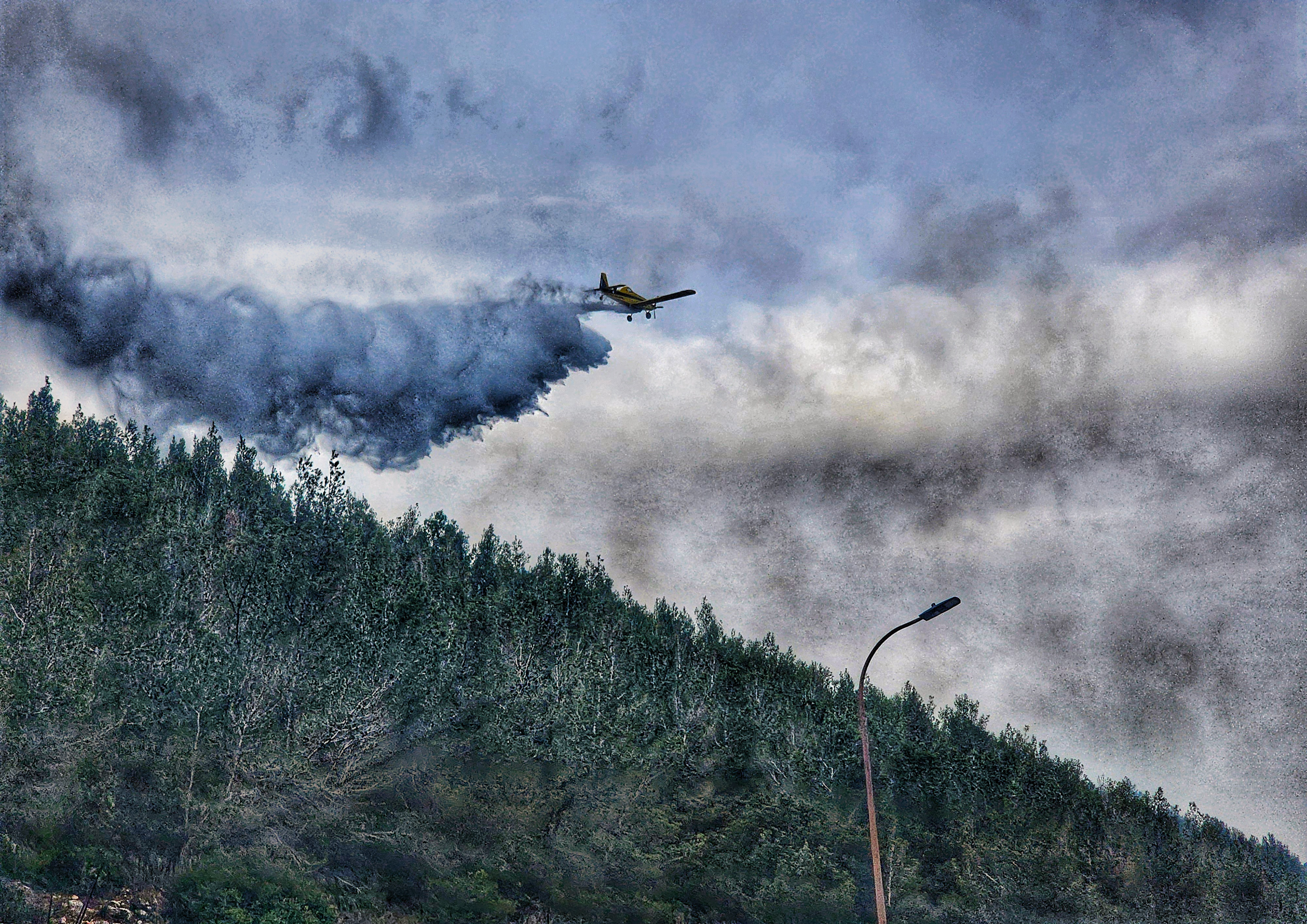
Fire fighting plane over Sha'ar HaGai on 24 April 2025

By the evening of 30 April, 163 firefighting squads and 12 airplanes were deployed by the Fire and Rescue Services. The Home Front Command and Technological and Logistics Directorate dispatched over 50 fire engines, several search and rescue teams, and supplied more than 300,000 liters of water. The Israel Defense Forces (IDF) used dozens of construction vehicles.

Eyal Zamir, the chief of staff of the IDF, ordered the Israeli military to respond to the fires. The Israeli Air Force dispatched several firefighting teams as well as four Lockheed Martin C-130J Super Hercules heavy transport planes, which had dropped over 95 loads of fire retardant overnight. Unit 669, a search and rescue unit of the IAF, performed scans with helicopters and a Beechcraft King Air plane. Unit 9900 of the Military Intelligence Directorate mapped out the fires with aircraft and satellites.

=== International assistance ===
Following the fires, Israeli foreign minister Gideon Sa'ar requested aid from several countries, including the United Kingdom, France, the Czech Republic, Sweden, Argentina, Spain, North Macedonia and Azerbaijan. Earlier, Israel formally requested assistance from Greece, Cyprus, Croatia, Italy and Bulgaria. Croatia and Italy sent three Canadair CL-415 firefighting airplanes.

Romania declared that it would dispatch two aircraft. José Manuel Albares, the foreign minister of Spain, declared that his nation would send two firefighting aircraft, and France also announced its intention to send one. Other countries that expressed "willingness to assist" included Ecuador and Ukraine, while other countries volunteered to send helicopters. The Palestinian Authority volunteered to send firefighting squads around Jerusalem, however Israel did not respond to the request.

== Impact ==
No serious injuries were reported, but at least 18 people were hospitalized at Kaplan Medical Center and Shamir Medical Center due to smoke inhalation or burns, including two pregnant women and two infants aged one and six months. Most of those admitted to Shamir Medical Center were from the Latrun area. Ten other people were treated without hospitalization. Hundreds of others were at risk, according to Magen David Adom. At least 17 firefighters were injured, including two requiring hospitalization. Authorities evacuated more than 7,000 residents in the area.

Up to ten communities in the vicinity were evacuated, including Neve Ilan, Shoresh, Nataf, Yad HaShmona, Eshtaol, and Mishmar Ayalon, while El'ad was partially evacuated. All evacuated communities were allowed to return to their homes by the following day. Highway 1, which connects Jerusalem to Tel Aviv, was closed to traffic, alongside Highway 3, Highway 424, Highway 444, and Highway 44. Trains between Jerusalem and Modi'in were suspended by Israel Railways, as were trains in the vicinity of Ashdod.

IQAir reported that Jerusalem momentarily had the worst air quality in the world amid the fires. By 1 May, the JNF estimated that around 20,000 dunams were destroyed in the fires, with 13,000 of those being woodland. No homes sustained damage, according to the Fire and Rescue Services. Around 70% of Canada Park in the Israeli-occupied West Bank was destroyed, with the scale of destruction being compared to the 2010 Mount Carmel forest fire which killed 44 people. Latin Patriarchate spokesman Farid Jubran reported heavy damage to agricultural land and some buildings in Catholic communities in the area, but no damage to historic churches.

Independence Day ceremonies were cancelled in several locations, including Jerusalem, Tel Aviv, Ashkelon, Modi'in, Beersheba, Mevaseret Zion, Lod, Ariel, Ma'ale Adumim, and Kiryat Ono. The annual torch-lighting ceremony on Mount Herzl that marks the transition between Yom HaZikaron and Independence Day was cancelled as well, and footage from a general rehearsal of the event on 28 April was aired instead. The Hostages and Missing Families Forum cancelled a planned rally in Tel Aviv's Hostages Square, while Israeli singers Sarit Hadad and Pe'er Tasi postponed their performance in Ashkelon.

== Cause ==
As of 1 May 2025, the cause of the fire was under investigation. Jerusalem District Fire Commander Shmulik Friedman initially telling reporters that they had no insight into the cause of the fires and were focusing on fighting and containing the fire at that time. Hebrew language media reported that a preliminary assessment found that negligence by hikers was a likely cause, and according to Channel 13, more hikers than average had visited the Mesilat Zion area, where the fire started, in the hours preceding it. Some, such as Israeli President Isaac Herzog and former lawmaker Dov Khenin, attributed the fires to the climate crisis.

=== Allegations of arson ===
In the evening of 30 April, Israeli officials announced that they had arrested several Palestinians on suspicion of attempted arson, one of which was allegedly caught with lighter, cotton wool and other flammable materials. The same day of the fires, it was reported that a Telegram channel associated with Hamas urged Palestinians to set fire to "fields, forests, and settlers' homes."

On 1 May, Netanyahu raised claims that 18 suspects had been detained in connection to the start of the wildfires. This was later scaled back by police sources to only three suspects detained with one already being in detention and his time extended.

== Reactions ==
Israeli President Isaac Herzog thanked all fire fighting efforts and connected the wildfire with the climate crisis, stating that the fire and climate change required the population to prepare for challenges, make decisions, and enact legislation to combat it.

Israel National Security Minister Itamar Ben Gvir, who also oversees the Israeli fire department publicly accused Palestinians of setting the fire and called for their execution.

After the fires started, Dov Ganem, the chairman of the Israel Fire and Air Rescue Association told Walla reporters that he had been raising concerns about the lack of preparedness for wildfires for almost twenty years but had been met with indifference from politicians.

== See also ==
- November 2016 Israel fires
- 2021 Israel wildfires
- Wildfires in 2025
