= AACI =

AACI may refer to:

- Anglo-American Committee of Inquiry
- Asociación Arte Concreto-Invención
- Association of American Cancer Institutes
- Association of Americans and Canadians in Israel
- American Accreditation Commission International
