= Bayt Nuba =

Bayt Nuba بيت نوبا Bait Nuba, Beit Nubah, Beit Nouba
- Etymology: "House of Nuba"
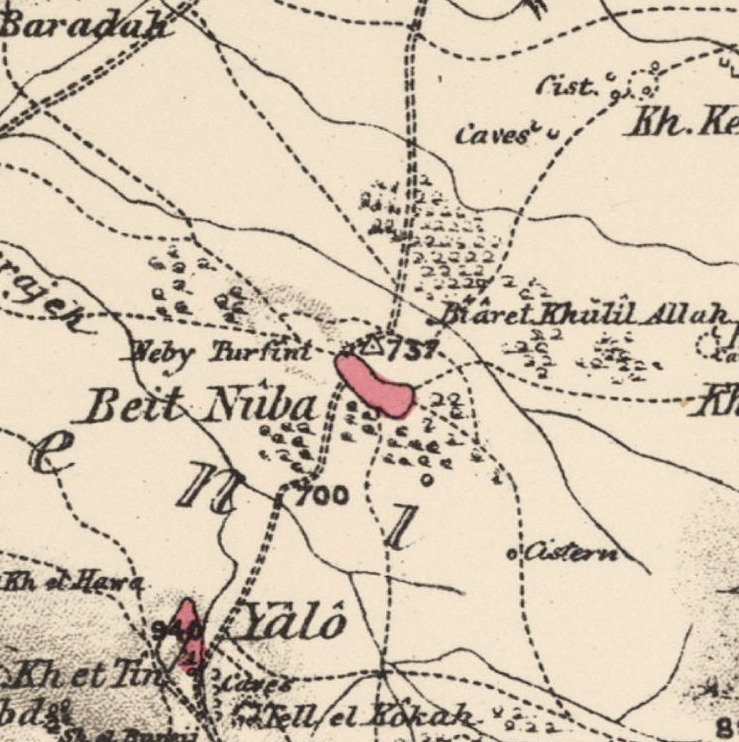
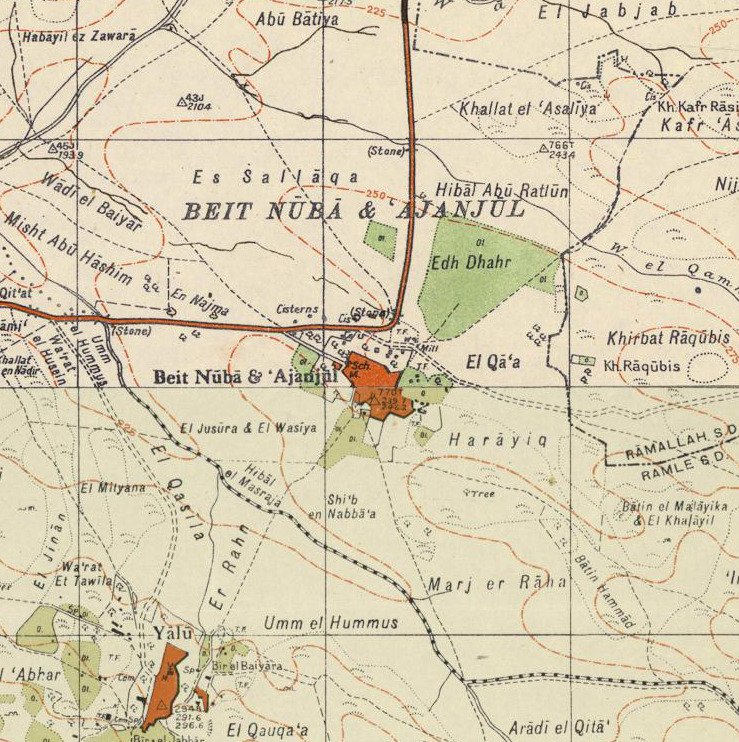
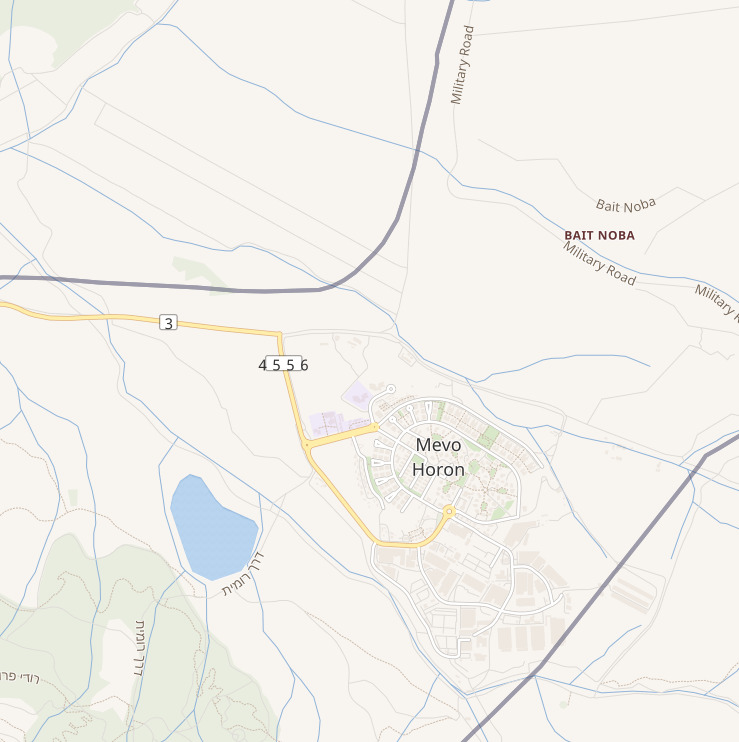
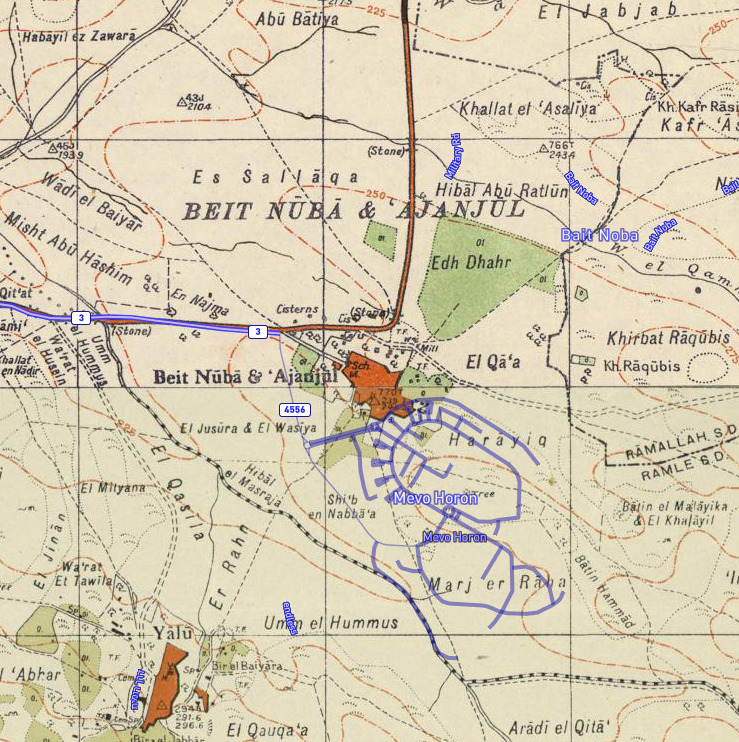
- 1870s map 1940s map modern map 1940s with modern overlay map A series of historical maps of the area around Bayt Nuba (click the buttons)

- Location within Mandatory Palestine
- Coordinates: 31°51′12″N 35°1′57″E
- Palestine grid: 153/139
- Geopolitical entity: Mandatory Palestine
- Subdistrict: Ramle
- Date of depopulation: 7 June 1967 (?)
- Cause(s) of depopulation: Expulsion by Israeli forces
- Current Localities: Mevo Horon

Bayt Nuba (Levantine Arabic: بيت نوبا, romanized: Bēt Nūba) is a depopulated Palestinian village located halfway between the Old City of Jerusalem and Ramla. During the Six-Day War of 1967, the Israel Defense Forces ethnically cleansed Bayt Nuba in the Naksa and replaced it with the Jewish-only Israeli settlement of Mevo Horon.

== History ==
Historically identified with the biblical city of Nob mentioned in the Book of Samuel, that association has been eschewed in modern times. The village is mentioned in extrabiblical sources including the writings of 5th-century Roman geographers, 12th-century Crusaders and a Jewish traveller, a 13th-century Syrian geographer, a 15th-century Arab historian, and Western travellers in the 19th century.

The Israeli settlement of Mevo Horon was established on its lands in 1970.

== History ==
The South Levantine Arabic name is of Aramaic extraction; nūba is Jewish Palestinian Aramaic: נובא, romanized: nōba, lit. 'fruit'.

The fifth-century Christian scholar Eusebius mentioned the village in his Onomasticon under the name Beth Annabam. He situated it at eight Roman miles from Lydda. His contemporary, Jerome, identifies it as biblical Nob.

During the Crusades, it was called Betynoble. The Crusaders identified Beit Nuba with biblical Nob, as did the 12th-century Jewish traveller Benjamin of Tudela. The village served as the forward position for Saladin's troops for their move towards Jerusalem in September 1187 and later for Richard the Lionheart and his troops who camped there in 1191 and 1192.

In the Crusader period, Kurds settled in Bayt Nuba. Writing in the 13th century during the time of Mamluk rule over Palestine, Yaqut al-Hamawi, the Syrian geographer, noted of Bayt Nuba, that it was, "A small town in the neighbourhood of Filastin (Ar Ramlah)." A road from Ramla to Jerusalem that passed through Bayt Nuba, al-Qubeiba, and Nabi Samwil was the preferred route for Christian pilgrims to the Holy Land at the time. On the maps produced by the Palestine Exploration Fund, the road, which stretches from al-Qubeiba to Jerusalem, is marked in the legend as a Roman road.

Mujir al-Din (1496), the Jerusalemite qadi and Arab historian, discussed the village's name in the context of other villages beginning with the word Bayt ("House"). He noted that conventional wisdom among the locals of his time held that they are named for prophets of the Hebrew Bible that were thought to have resided there in antiquity. He also delineated the village as forming the westernmost limit of what was considered the area of Jerusalem at his time.

=== Ottoman era ===
The village does not appear in 16th-century tax records.

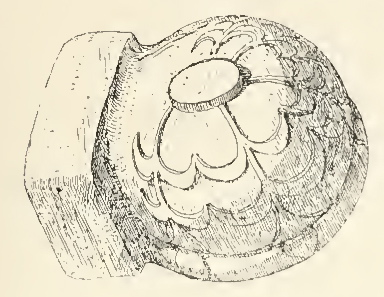
Part of medieval church discovered by Clermont-Ganneau, and destroyed in 1967.

The waqf custodian of the mosque in Bayt Nuba (and 'Allar) in 1810 was appointed by the Ottoman imperial authorities and hailed from a Jerusalemite family of notables, the House of Dajani.

Edward Robinson and Eli Smith visited Beit Nubah in 1838 and 1852, and identified it as the Nobe mentioned by Jerome and considered by some of their contemporaries to be Bethannaba. Victor Guérin noted in 1863 the presence of a small mosque in the village named Djama Sidi Ahmed et-Tarfinù. At his time, Beit-Nouba was made up of about 400 inhabitants whose homes were constructed on a hill between two valleys. In large, modern buildings in the village could be seen traces of more ancient building materials incorporated therein and there are some ancient cisterns as well.

Albert Socin found from an official Ottoman village list from about 1870 that Bet Nuba had 23 houses and a population of 97, though the population count included only men. Hartmann found that Bet Nuba had 20 houses.

In 1873, Charles Simon Clermont-Ganneau discovered the remains of a large medieval church in the village. In 1883, the PEF's Survey of Western Palestine described Bayt Nuba as a "good-sized village on flat ground".

In 1896, the population of Bet Nuba was estimated at about 723 persons. Some residents of the village had origins in Transjordan.

=== British Mandate era ===
In the 1922 census of Palestine, conducted by the British Mandate authorities, Bayt Nuba had a population of 839, all Muslim. This had increased in the 1931 census to 944, still all Muslim, in 226 houses.

In Village Statistics, 1945 the population of Beit Nuba and Ajanjul was 1,240, all Muslims, while the total land area was 11,401 dunams, according to an official land and population survey. of which 1002 dunams were allocated for plantations and irrigable land and 6997 for cereals. while 74 dunams were classified as built-up areas.

=== Jordanian era ===
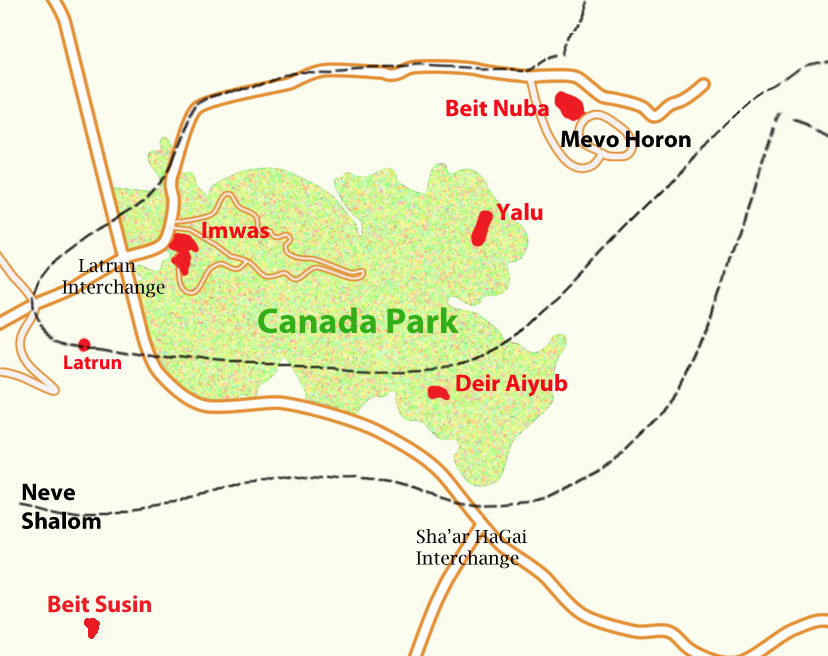
Map showing depopulated and destroyed Palestinian villages in the Latrun area, and the Israeli settlement of Mevo Horon and Canada Park, established after Israel's occupation of the area in the wake of the 1967 war

During the 1948 Arab–Israeli War, the village was garrisoned by the Arab Legion to defend the Latrun salient. Located 2 miles (3.2 km) behind the front line, it was subject to a skirmish attack launched by Israeli forces in Operation Yoram on the night of June 8, 1948.

The 1949 armistice line fell just a few kilometers to the south and west of villages in the Latrun salient, and with a dispute between Israel and Jordan over where it lay exactly, much of the area surrounding Bayt Nuba was declared no man's land, resulting in social and economic separation from the surrounding areas. Residents of Bayt Nuba and other Latrun villages were granted Jordanian citizenship following Jordan's annexation of the West Bank in 1950. Many were prompted to leave the area to seek livelihoods in Jordan, the Persian Gulf, South America or elsewhere due to violence between villagers and Israeli troops and the loss of access to farmlands.

In 1961, the population was 1,350 persons.

=== 1967, and aftermath ===
The Latrun area was captured by the IDF in the first few hours of the Six-Day War, and the next night, orders were broadcast by Israeli military jeeps to villagers in Bayt Nuba, Yalo, and Imwas to leave their homes, resulting in some 12,000 people leaving in the space of a few hours. With the war's completion, a military radio announcement said that villagers in the West Bank who had vacated their homes should return; however, the villagers of Bayt Nuba and others from the Latrun area were forbidden to do so, as most of the area had been declared a closed military zone. Those who tried to return were stopped at checkpoints where some were shot at. The built-up area of Bayt Nuba was destroyed in military-engineered explosions after the war's end, an act witnessed by some of the former residents who had fled nearby hills. After the destruction, the remains of the medieval church, first described by Clermont-Ganneau, have not been located.

Part of the farmlands of Bayt Nuba lay outside the closed military zone, according to Tobias Kelly, some refugees from the village rented homes in a nearby village of around 7000 called Bayt Hajjar to continue farming those lands. The settlement of Mevo Horon was built on the lands of Bayt Nuba in 1970.

== Where did they come from ==
Some of Bayt Nuba's residents were Kurds who settled in Palestine during the Crusader era, while others came from Transjordan.

== Bibliography ==
- Barron, J.B., ed. (1923). Palestine: Report and General Abstracts of the Census of 1922. Government of Palestine.
- Clermont-Ganneau, C.S. (1896). [ARP] Archaeological Researches in Palestine 1873-1874, translated from the French by J. McFarlane. Vol. 2. London: Palestine Exploration Fund.
- Conder, C.R; Kitchener, H.H. (1883). The Survey of Western Palestine: Memoirs of the Topography, Orography, Hydrography, and Archaeology. Vol. 3. London: Committee of the Palestine Exploration Fund.
- Government of Jordan, Department of Statistics (1964). First Census of Population and Housing. Volume I: Final Tables; General Characteristics of the Population (PDF).
- Government of Palestine, Department of Statistics (1945). Village Statistics, April, 1945.
- Guérin, V. (1868). Description Géographique Historique et Archéologique de la Palestine (in French). Vol. 1: Judee, pt. 1. Paris: L'Imprimerie Nationale.
- Hadawi, S. (1970). Village Statistics of 1945: A Classification of Land and Area ownership in Palestine. Palestine Liberation Organization Research Center.
- Hartmann, M. (1883). "Die Ortschaftenliste des Liwa Jerusalem in dem türkischen Staatskalender für Syrien auf das Jahr 1288 der Flucht (1871)". Zeitschrift des Deutschen Palästina-Vereins. 6: 102–149.
- Kelly, Tobias (2006). Law, Violence and Sovereignty Among West Bank Palestinians. Cambridge University Press. ISBN 1139460994.
- Kelly, Tobias (2009). Stef Jansen; Staffan Löfving (eds.). Struggles for home: violence, hope and the movement of people. Berghahn Books. ISBN 978-1-84545-523-1.
- Kushner, David (1986). Palestine in the late Ottoman period: political, social, and economic transformation. Brill. ISBN 978-90-04-07792-8.
- Le Strange, G. (1890). Palestine Under the Moslems: A Description of Syria and the Holy Land from A.D. 650 to 1500. London: Committee of the Palestine Exploration Fund.
- Mills, E., ed. (1932). Census of Palestine 1931. Population of Villages, Towns and Administrative Areas. Jerusalem: Government of Palestine.
- Morris, B. (2008). 1948: A History of the Arab-Israeli War. Yale University Press. ISBN 978-0-300-12696-9.
- Moudjir ed-dyn (1876). Sauvaire (ed.). Histoire de Jérusalem et d'Hébron depuis Abraham jusqu'à la fin du XVe siècle après J.-C. : fragments de la Chronique de Moudjir-ed-dyn.
- Palmer, E.H. (1881). The Survey of Western Palestine: Arabic and English Name Lists Collected During the Survey by Lieutenants Conder and Kitchener, R. E. Transliterated and Explained by E.H. Palmer. Committee of the Palestine Exploration Fund.
- Pringle, D. (1993). The Churches of the Crusader Kingdom of Jerusalem: A-K (excluding Acre and Jerusalem). Vol. I. Cambridge University Press. ISBN 0-521-39036-2.
- Pringle, D. (1998). The Churches of the Crusader Kingdom of Jerusalem: L-Z (excluding Tyre). Vol. II. Cambridge University Press. ISBN 0521390370.
- Robinson, E.; Smith, E. (1841). Biblical Researches in Palestine, Mount Sinai and Arabia Petraea: A Journal of Travels in the year 1838. Vol. 3. Boston: Crocker & Brewster.
- Robinson, E.; Smith, E. (1856). Later Biblical Researches in Palestine and adjacent regions: A Journal of Travels in the year 1852. London: John Murray.
- Schick, C. (1896). "Zur Einwohnerzahl des Bezirks Jerusalem". Zeitschrift des Deutschen Palästina-Vereins. 19: 120–127.
- Socin, A. (1879). "Alphabetisches Verzeichniss von Ortschaften des Paschalik Jerusalem". Zeitschrift des Deutschen Palästina-Vereins. 2: 135–163.
- Stubbs, W., ed. (1864). Chronicles and memorials of the reign of Richard I. Original from Oxford University.
