= Carl Alpert =

American journalist (1913–2005)

- קרל אלפרט
- Born: May 12, 1913; Boston, MA
- Died: May 12, 2005 (aged 92)
- Occupation: Journalist
- Writing career
- Subjects: Politics, Zionism, Israel

Carl Alpert (Hebrew: קרל אלפרט; May 12, 1913 – May 12, 2005) was a Boston-born journalist, author, communal worker and public relations specialist, first in the United States and then in Israel (where he settled in 1952 after making Aliyah). He died on his 92nd birthday, which was also Israel Independence Day.

His first newspaper article appeared on April 25, 1930, and his last was dated March 14, 2005. His syndicated articles appeared in Denver's Intermountain Jewish News over the course of 67 years. From the time he wrote his first column in The Jewish Advocate of Boston in 1937 to his termination of his syndicated column in 2005 due to ill health, he calculated that he had written some 3,300 columns. In 1997, he was self-syndicated in close to 50 Jewish newspapers worldwide, and in 2005 he had a mailing list of some 100 recipients (mainly serials).

== Life ==
Alpert was born to Max L. Alpert and Flora Effross in Boston; the Jewish couple also had a daughter, Marcia and a son, Sumner. Alpert began his career serving as a copywriter at the Bay State Mailing Service in Boston in 1930, becoming a reporter at the city’s Jewish Advocate newspaper in 1932 and then its editor from 1935-40. During that time he attended Boston University (1931–35).

He became a devoted Zionist in 1927 as a result of his connection with Young Judaea. “All my information and early education about Zionism came from Young Judaea. I threw myself wholeheartedly into the movement and began to read and study voraciously everything I found on the Zionist movement,” he recalled in later years. Alpert was the director of the Young Judaean Clubs (1934–36), becoming president of the movement’s New England region in 1937 and president of the movement itself in 1940. In that year he became managing editor of the New Palestine, published by the Zionist Organization of America. His work at the New Palestine was interrupted when he was inducted into the US Army as a private in 1943. He served in the military until 1946 and then returned to his work at New Palestine. In 1946 he became director of the Department of Education of the Zionist Organization of America. He moved to Israel in 1952, working as the director of public relations (1952-5) and later assistant to the president at the Technion. He retired in 1983, at which time he was executive vice chairman of the board of governors at the Technion.

In 1940, Alpert married Natalie (Nechama) Tennenbaum of Cincinnati, whom he had met at Young Judaea. The couple, married for 64 years, had three children.

== Journalism career ==
Alpert's career as a Jewish journalist lasted nearly 75 years. Among such Jewish journalists with long careers were Nechemia Meyers (1930–2009), an American who was a public relations specialist for 32 years and a journalist in Israel for at least 25 years, and was a syndicated writer; the English-born Julian L. Meltzer (1904–77), who spent 51 years writing for publications in Palestine and elsewhere; Boris Smolar (1897–1986), a Ukraine-born American reporter and editor in Europe and elsewhere for more than 60 years; Julius Hayman (1907–2000), publisher for 63 years of The Jewish Standard (Toronto); Philip Slomovitz (1896–1993), regarded as the “dean of Jewish journalists,” a newspaperman in Detroit for 71 years; Violet Spevack, who wrote, over a period of nearly 50 years, some 2,500 columns in the Cleveland Jewish News; and Gabriel Murrel Cohen (1908–2007), who founded the National Jewish Post & Opinion in Indianapolis in 1935 and continued editing it until close to his death.

From the beginning of his career, Alpert was recognized as “one of the hardest-working Anglo-Jewish editors in the profession.” On several occasions he took on controversial subjects in the media, including responses to a widely-discussed 1949 Commentary article by Isaac Rosenfeld and to a 1951 The New York Times editorial which faulted President Harry Truman for recognizing Israel. Alpert maintained a Jewish reference file of more than 75,000 clippings.

“From his sunny perch high on the slopes of Haifa’s Mount Carmel,” stated an editorial in the Intermountain Jewish News, Alpert “observed Israel with the unusual combination of a sage’s wisdom and a child’s wonder ... Israel never ceased to amaze and fascinate him, even when it frustrated and saddened. He excelled at sharing those paradoxes.”

“An Alpert column followed a pattern,” stated another editor, “the presentation of an interesting personality or issue, followed by a description … of various points of view on the subject. Columns were always informatively researched, often containing little-known information … Finally, the reader … would often be left with a question or two to ponder.”

In 2000, at the age of 87, after having officially retired in 1983, he noted that he was too busy to write his memoirs: “I have quite a list of the things I’d like to do – when I retire.” His wife acknowledged that “I did have my rivals – the Technion and his column. But I joined rather than fought.”

In 2013, an article in The American Jewish Archives Journal (Volume 65 containing numbers 1 & 2) featured Carl Alpert's 1938 reportage.

== Recognition ==
In 2002, Alpert was cited for his work at the Association of Americans and Canadians in Israel (for which he had served as president from 1957 to 1959), and that December in Haifa he was awarded the title of “Citizen of Merit” for his journalism career. In 2003, the Carl Alpert Technion Employees Center was named in his honor.

== Articles ==
Alpert wrote widely and also translated works from Hebrew to English; there is no bibliography of his serial publications. He was also a contributor to encyclopedias, including the Universal Jewish Encyclopedia; Encyclopaedia Judaica (first edition, 1973); and World Scope Encyclopedia (published from 1945 to 1963).

== Selected books and pamphlets ==
- The Oracle: A Jewish Reference Book (Boston, 1935)
- To the Land of their Fathers: A dramatic history of the Zionist movement, 1895-1938 (Boston, 1938)
- Telling the Truth about the Jews: A concise factual refutation of various modern anti-Semitic libels (Boston, 1939)
- Technion: The Story of Israel Institute of Technology (New York, 1982)
