= Ajanjul =

Ajanjul عجنجول 'Ajanjul, Ajenjul
- Etymology: Kh. Junjul: The ruin of Junjul
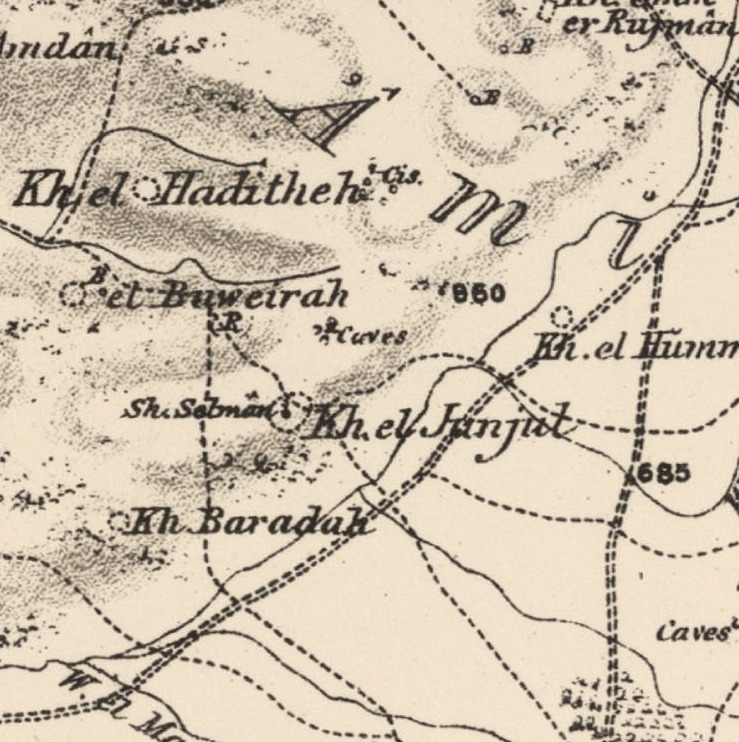
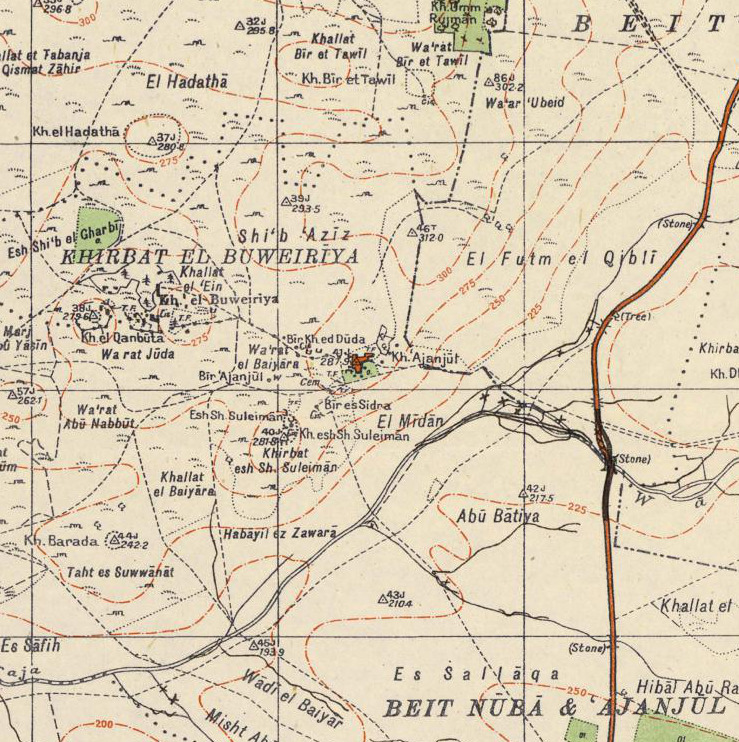
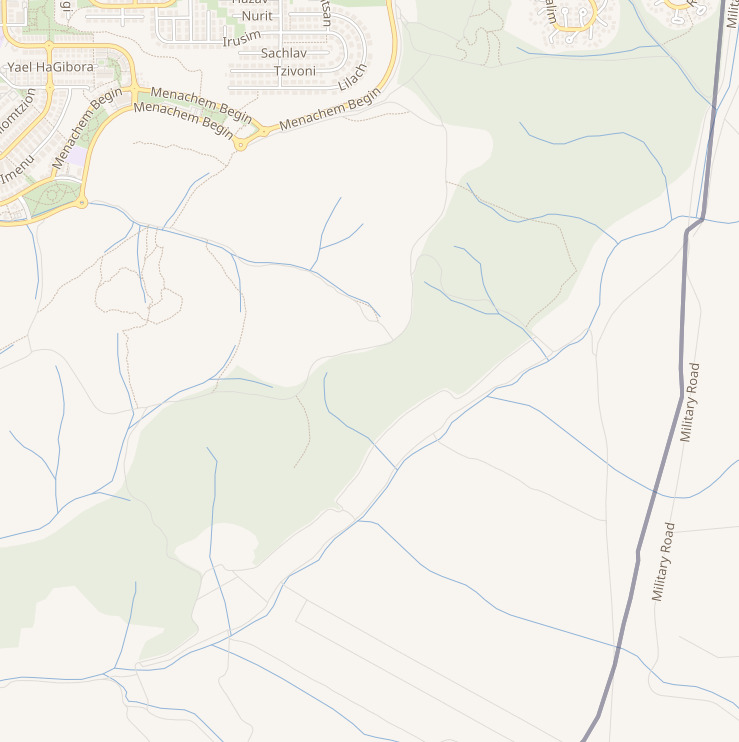
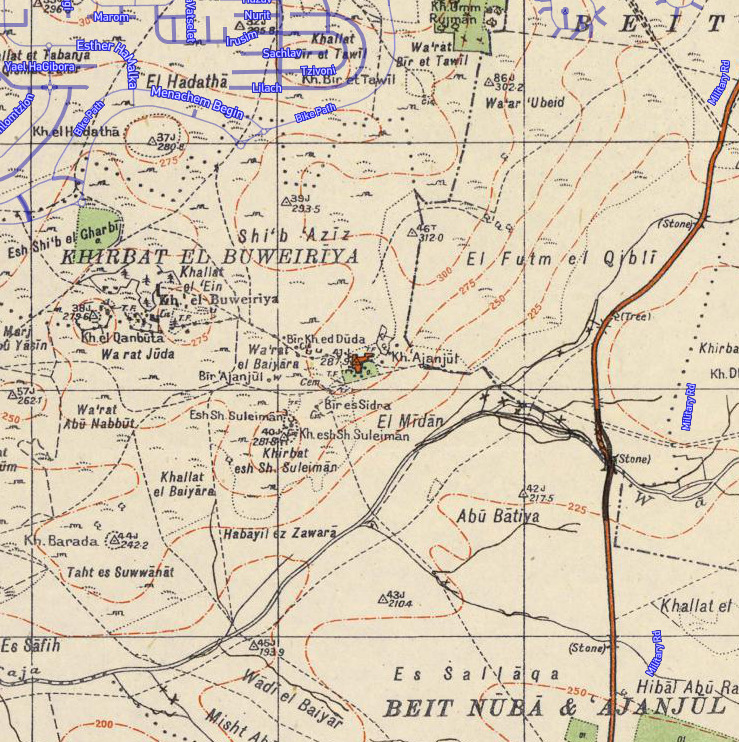
- 1870s map 1940s map modern map 1940s with modern overlay map A series of historical maps of the area around Ajanjul (click the buttons)

- Location within Mandatory Palestine
- Coordinates: 31°52′17″N 35°01′26″E
- Palestine grid: 152/142
- Geopolitical entity: Mandatory Palestine
- Subdistrict: Ramle

Ajanjul (Arabic: عجنجول, Ajanjǔl) was a Palestinian Arab village in the Ramle Subdistrict of Mandatory Palestine. It was depopulated during the 1947–48 Civil War in Mandatory Palestine.

== Etymology ==
The name /ʽglgwl/ is of Aramaic origins, meaning a "small calf".

== History ==
The Abu Ghosh family took up residence in Ajanjul in the 18th century. The village is described as a place "from where they (the Abu Ghosh) controlled the Valley of Ayalon, including the important village of Bayt Liqya".

In 1838, it was noted as a place "in ruins or deserted."

In 1883, the PEF's Survey of Western Palestine found at Kh. Junjul: "traces of ruins".

By the beginning of the 20th century, residents from Beit 'Anan settled the site, establishing it as a dependency – or satellite village – of their home village.

=== British Mandate era ===
According to a census conducted in 1931 by the British Mandate authorities, Ajanjul had a population of 19, in 5 houses.

In the 1945 statistics the population of Beit Nuba and Ajanjul was 1,240, all Muslims, while the total land area was 11,401 dunams, according to an official land and population survey. Of this, 1,002 dunams were allocated for plantations and irrigable land, 6,997 for cereals, while 74 dunams were classified as built-up areas.

There is no record of what happened to the villagers in 1948.

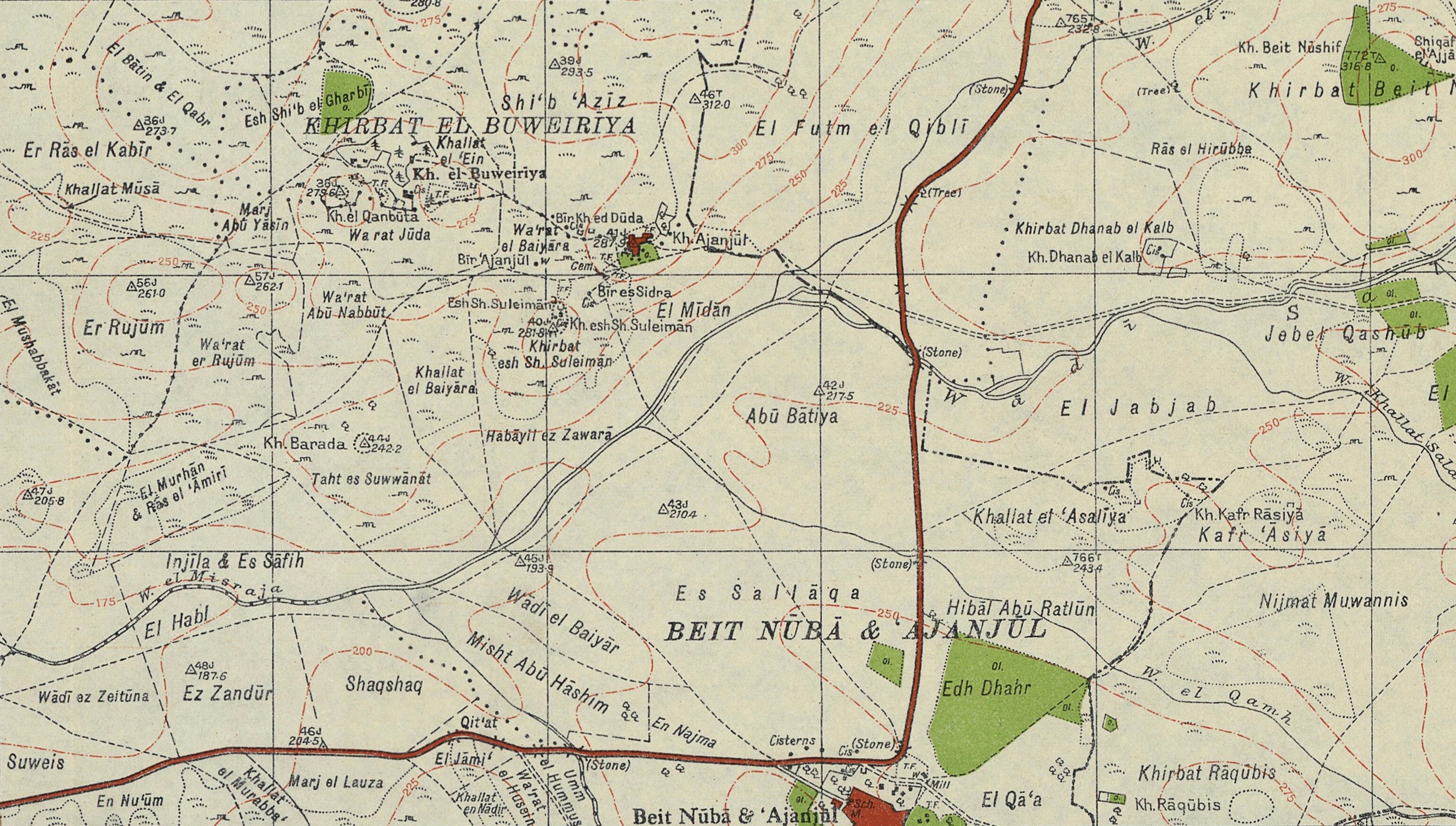
Khirbat 'Ajanjul from 1919 survey 1:20,000. Beit Nuba at bottom.

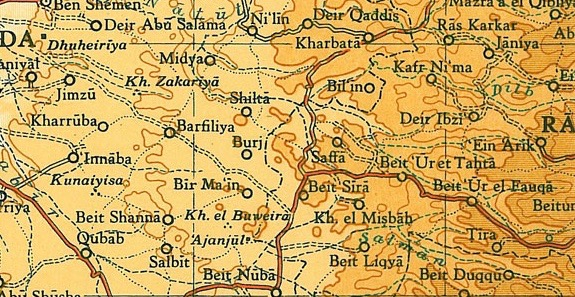
'Ajanjul 1945 1:250,000 (bottom left quadrant)

=== 1948, aftermath ===
In 1992 the village site was described: ”The stone debris of houses, concentrated in a small spot and overgrown with wild vegetation, are all that remains of the village. Fig, almond, and mulberry trees also grow on and around the site. On the southern side of the village there is a rocky structure containing two graves; southwest of it lies the village cemetery, where two stone graves are visible. The area is closed and is located along the 1967 border between Jordan and Israel."

== Bibliography ==
- Conder, C.R.; Kitchener, H.H. (1883). The Survey of Western Palestine: Memoirs of the Topography, Orography, Hydrography, and Archaeology. Vol. 3. London: Committee of the Palestine Exploration Fund.
- Department of Statistics (1945). Village Statistics, April, 1945. Government of Palestine.
- Hadawi, S. (1970). Village Statistics of 1945: A Classification of Land and Area ownership in Palestine. Palestine Liberation Organiz]ation Research Center. Archived from the original on 2018-12-08.
- Kark, R.; Oren-Nordheim, Michal (2001). Jerusalem and its environs: quarters, neighborhoods, villages, 1800–1948 (Illustrated ed.). Wayne State University Press. ISBN 978-0-8143-2909-2.
- Khalidi, W. (1992). All That Remains: The Palestinian Villages Occupied and Depopulated by Israel in 1948. Washington D.C.: Institute for Palestine Studies. ISBN 0-88728-224-5.
- Palmer, E. H. (1881). The Survey of Western Palestine: Arabic and English Name Lists Collected During the Survey by Lieutenants Conder and Kitchener, R. E. Transliterated and Explained by E.H. Palmer. Committee of the Palestine Exploration Fund.
- Robinson, E.; Smith, E. (1841). Biblical Researches in Palestine, Mount Sinai and Arabia Petraea: A Journal of Travels in the year 1838. Vol. 3. Boston: Crocker & Brewster.
