= Mevo Horon =

Israeli settlement in the West Bank

Mevo Horon: מבוא חורון (Hebrew)
- Moshav shitufi
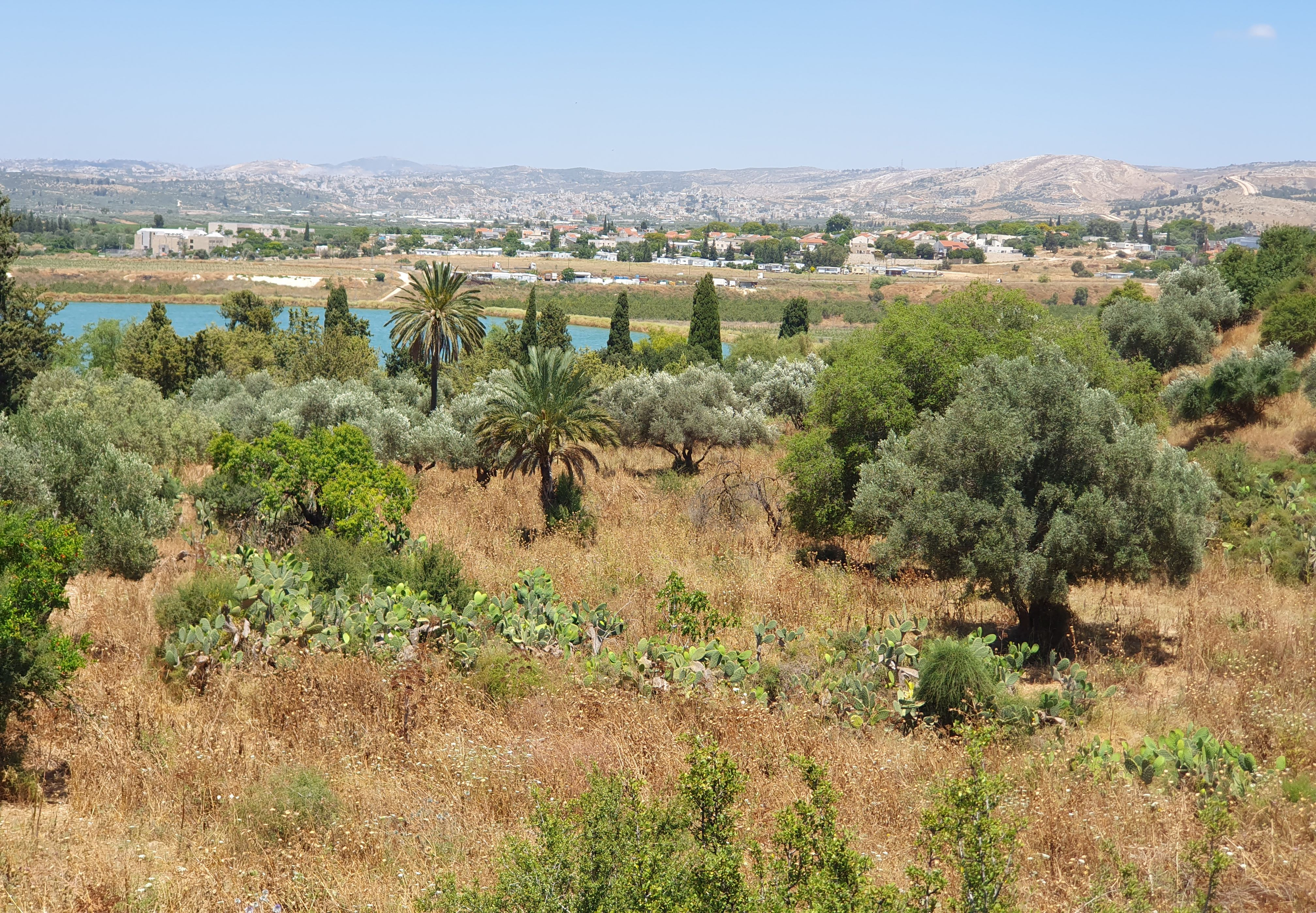
- Etymology: Horon Gateway
- Location within the Central West Bank Location within the West Bank
- Coordinates: 31°50′57″N 35°2′9″E
- Country: Palestine
- District: Judea and Samaria Area
- Council: Mateh Binyamin
- Region: West Bank
- Affiliation: Poalei Agudat Yisrael
- Founded: 1970
- Founder: Ezra members
- Population (2024): 2,659
- Website: www.binyaminregion.org.il/mevo-horon/

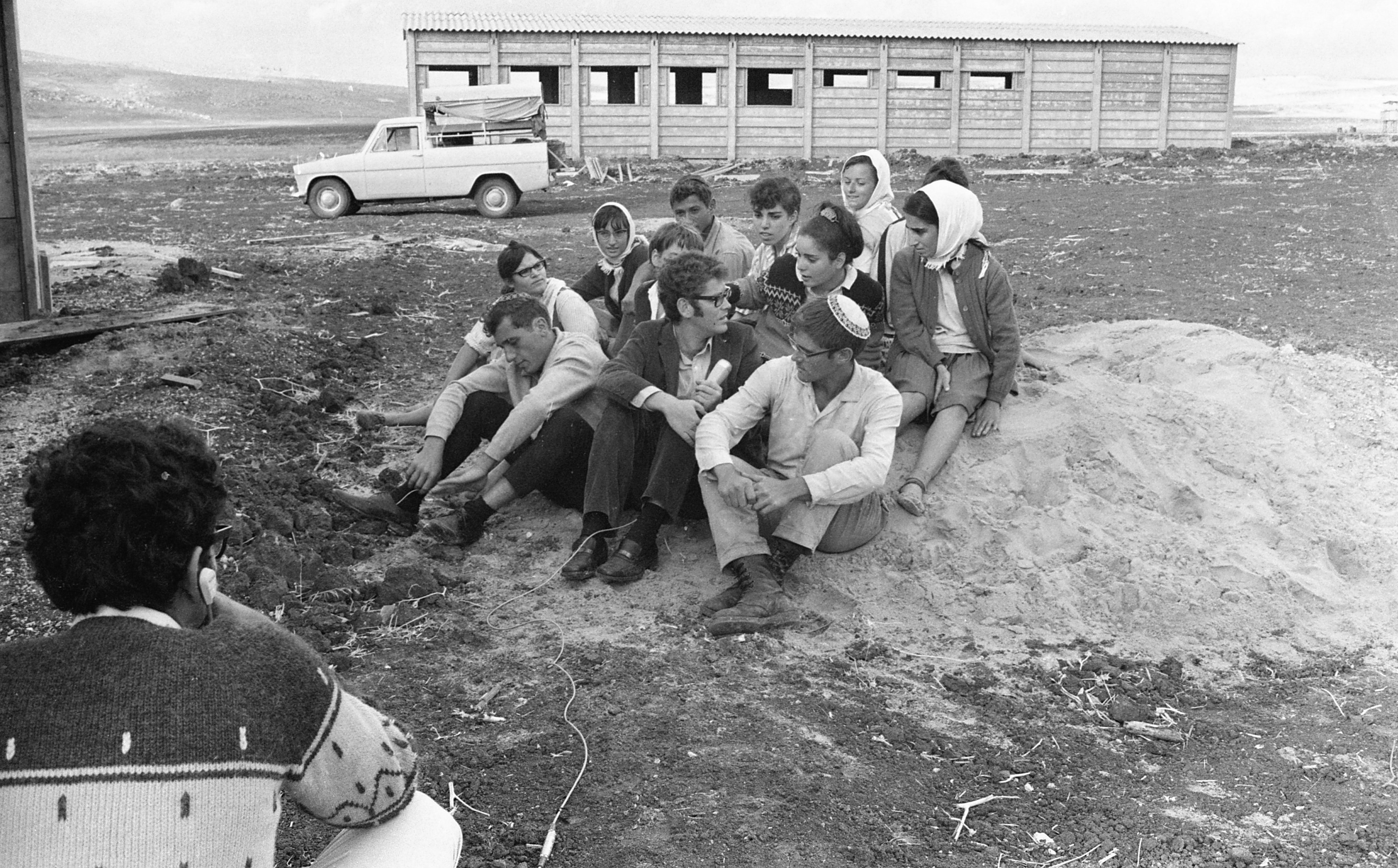
Mevo Horon in 1969

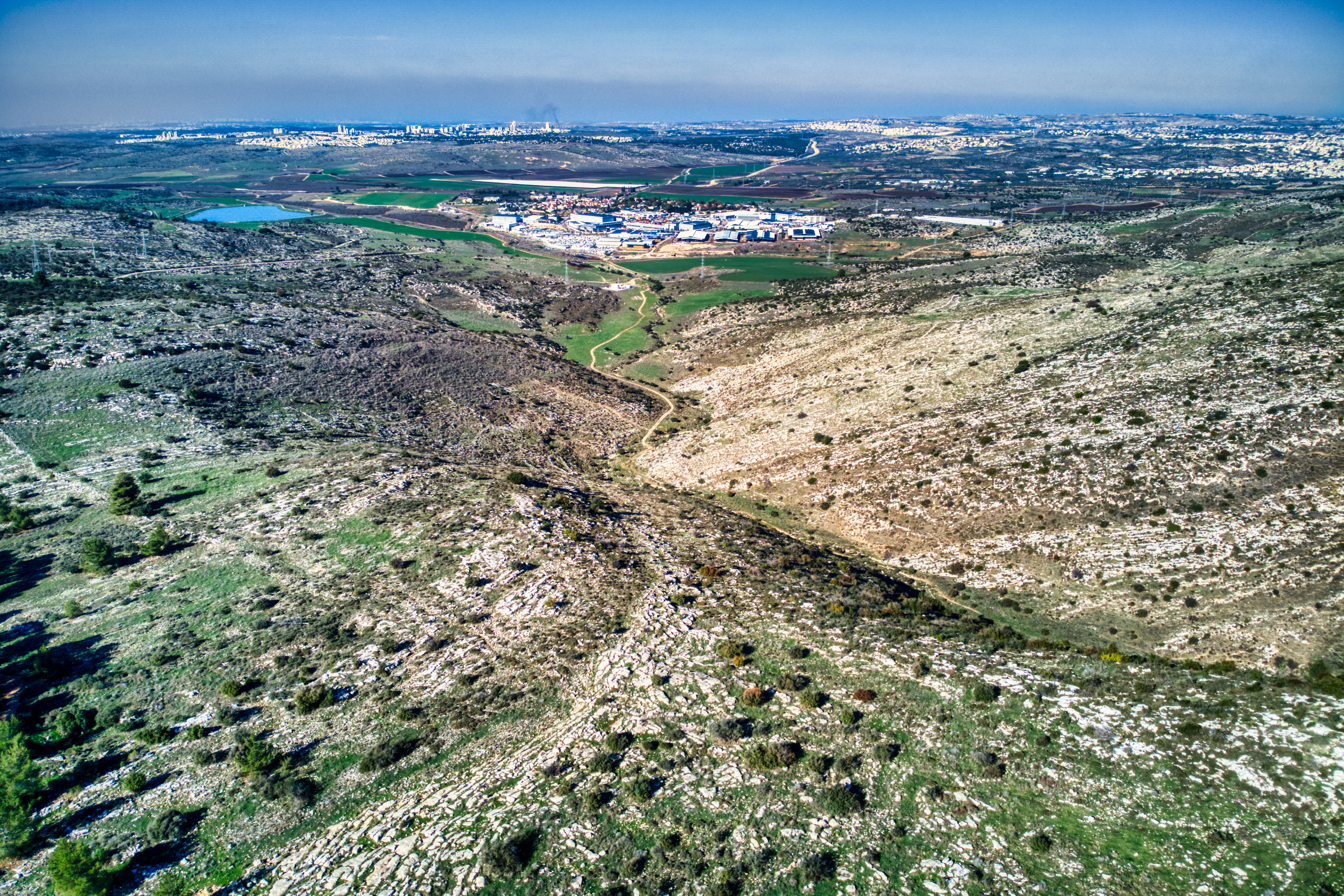
The Yitla stream flows and reaches Mevo Horon

Mevo Horon (Hebrew: מבוא חורון, lit. 'Horon Gateway') is an Israeli settlement and religious moshav shitufi in the Israeli-occupied West Bank. Located near Latrun and the city of Modi'in, it falls under the jurisdiction of Mateh Binyamin Regional Council. In 2024 it had a population of 2,659.

The settlement was established directly on the former Palestinian villages of Yalo, Imwas and Bayt Nuba, ethnically cleansed and destroyed by the Israel Defense Forces during the Six-Day War. The international community considers Israeli settlements in the West Bank illegal under international law, but the Israeli government disputes this.

== History ==
Mevo Horon was established in 1970 by members of the Ezra youth movement and was the first village in the Mateh Binyamin council area. It moved to the present site in 1974. It is named after the biblical Beit Horon (Joshua 10:10), the modern Arab villages of Beit Ur al-Fauqa and Beit Ur al-Tahta.

Some Palestinians managed to return to the area after their expulsion from the villages of Yalo, Imwas and Bayt Nuba on whose lands the moshav was established, and gained employment as farm hands at Mevo Horon in the 1980s. During the early stages of the Al Aqsa Intifada, when the main checkpoint into Israel was moved several kilometers east of Mevo Horon and further into the West Bank, the moshav made arrangements to pick up these workers at the new checkpoint, though since they lacked Israeli work permits, difficulties arose.

On 7 June 2018 residents of Mevo Horon and Israeli descendants of Dutch Jews inaugurated the town's Chasdei Enosh synagogue, which is an exact replica of the synagogue that once stood in Terborg, in the Netherlands. The original in Terborg was hit by an American bomb on 8 March 1945 and was not reconstructed because there were no longer ten adult Jewish men in Terborg in order to reestablish services. In 1958, after the demolition of the ruins, an office building was erected at the location. A stolperstein marks the former location of the synagogue in Terborg.

== Archaeology ==
During the Roman period, the region where the modern settlement stands was part of the Lydda toparchy in Judaea. A Bar Kokhba coin recently recovered from an undisturbed context during salvage excavations adds to the evidence that this toparchy participated in the Bar Kokhba Revolt.
