= Nahshon, Israel =

Nahshon: נחשון (Hebrew)
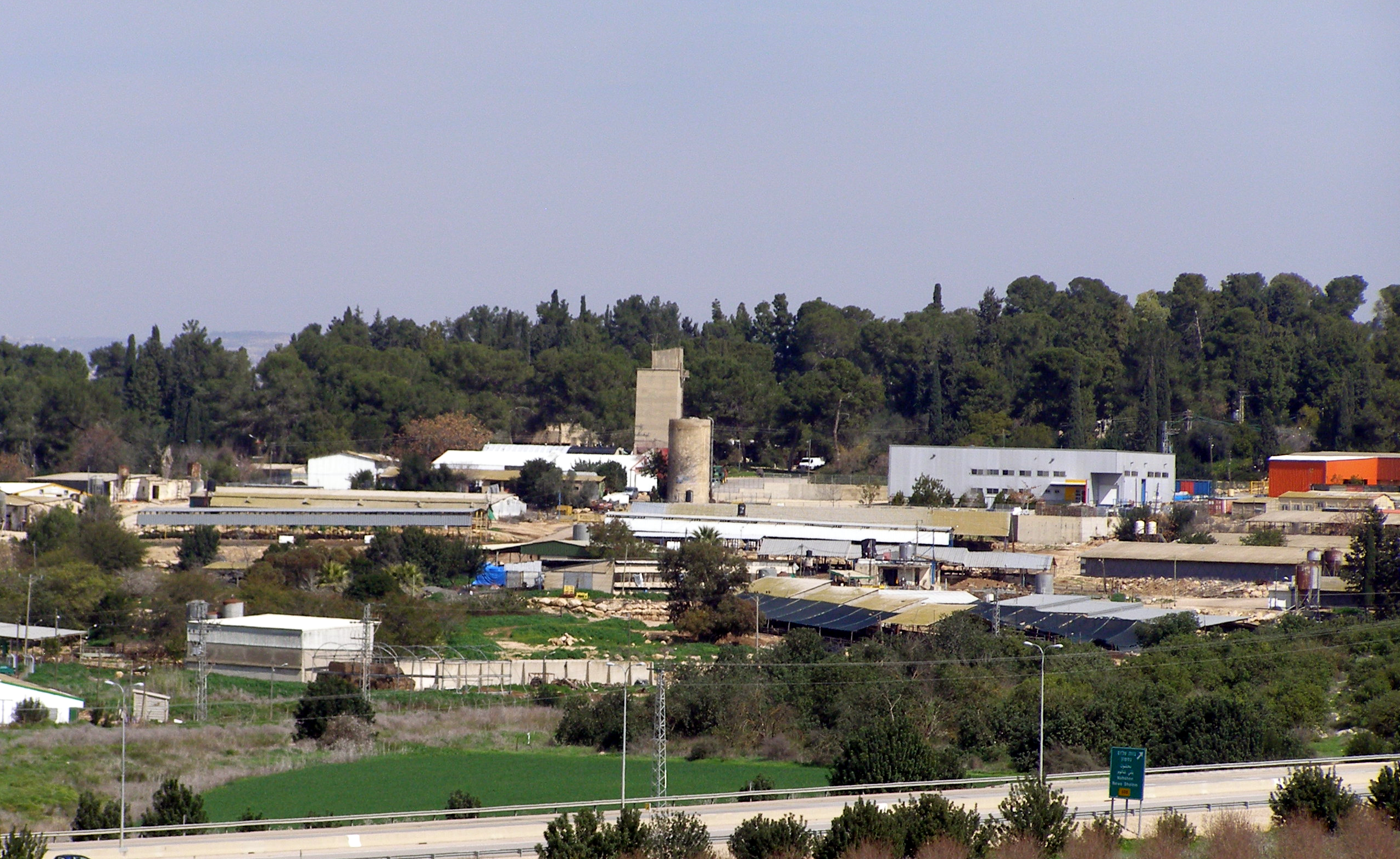

- Location within Jerusalem District Location within Israel
- Coordinates: 31°49′49″N 34°57′19″E
- Country: Israel
- District: Jerusalem
- Council: Mateh Yehuda
- Affiliation: Kibbutz Movement
- Founded: 1950
- Founder: Hashomer Hatzair members
- Population (2024): 608
- Website: www.nachshon.org.il

Nahshon (Hebrew: נחשון) is a kibbutz in central Israel. Located in the Ayalon Valley to the south-west of Modi'in, it falls under the jurisdiction of Mateh Yehuda Regional Council. In 2024 it had a population of 608.

== History ==
The village was established in 1950 by immigrant members of Hashomer Hatzair. It was named after Operation Nachshon, which opened up the Jerusalem road during the 1948 Arab–Israeli War.

After the Six-Day War in 1967 around 80 Egyptian soldiers were buried in a mass grave in fields tended by kibbutz Nahshon. The field was later turned into a tourist attraction, called Mini Israel.

In July 2023 the kibbutz was the site of a “festival of democracy”, the destination for a protest march against proposed judicial reforms that started in Tel Aviv and ended in nearby Jerusalem.
