= Ayalon Valley =

Valley in Shephelah, Israel

Coordinates: 31°50′25″N 35°01′21″E

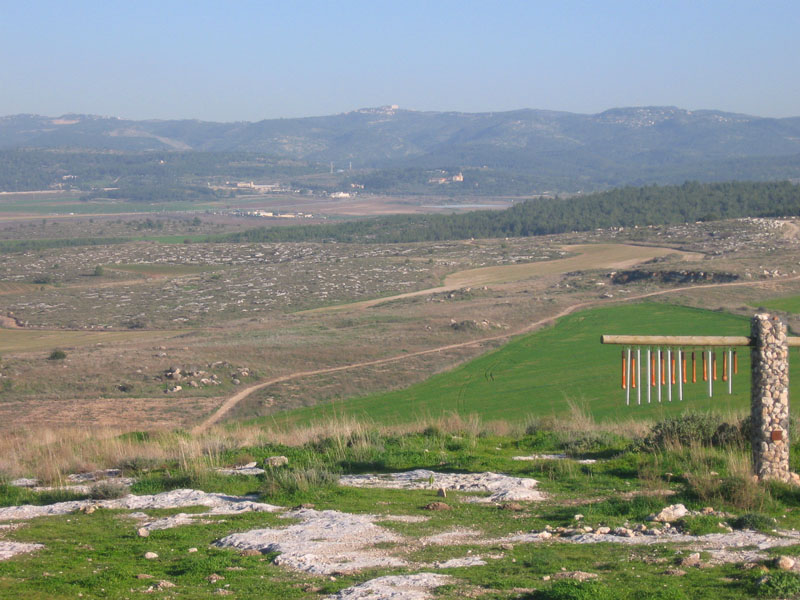
Ayalon Valley, as seen from Gezer

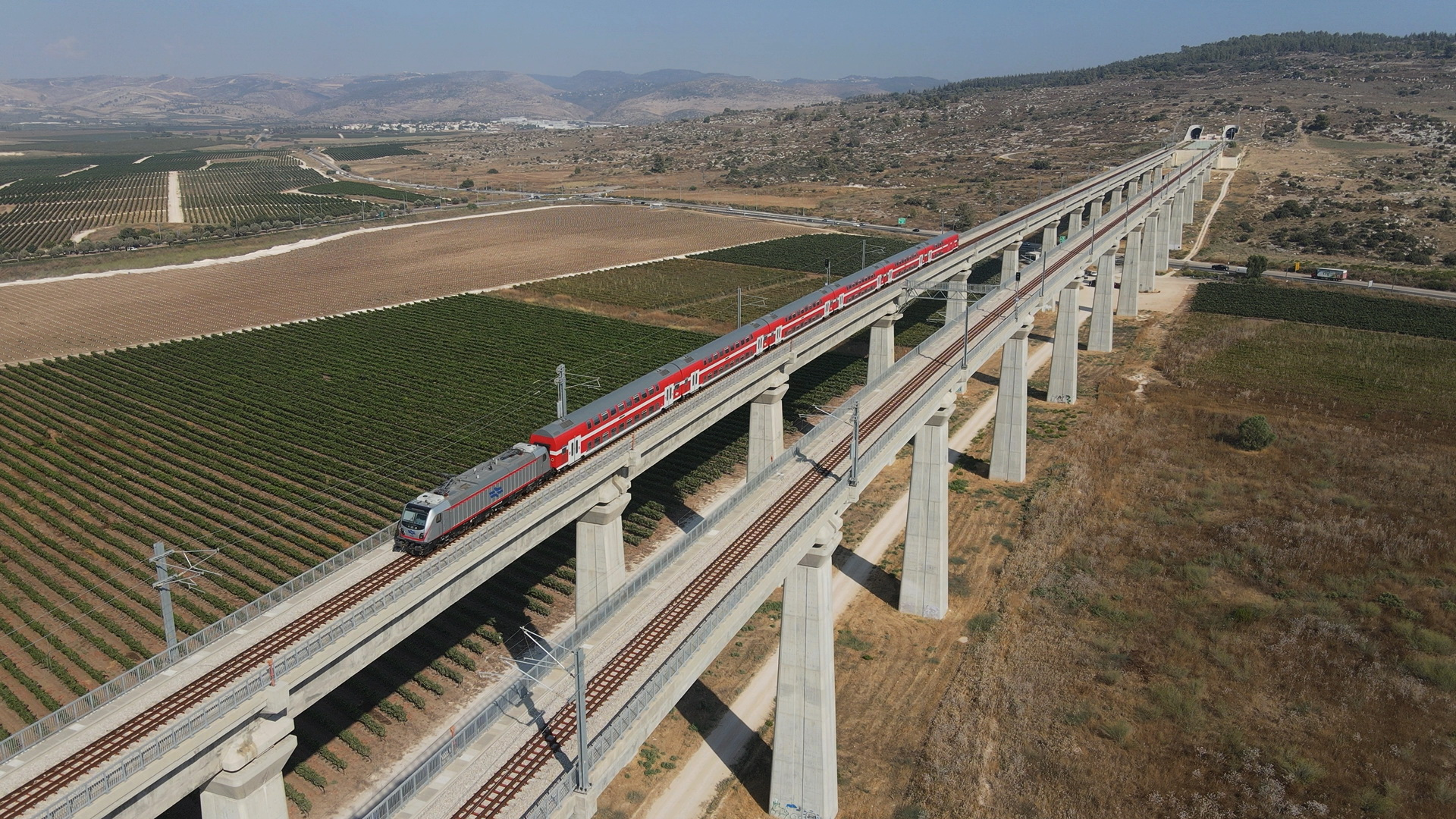
Train passes Ayalon Valley, Israel

The Ayalon Valley (Hebrew: אַיָּלוֹן or איילון, ʾAyyālōn), also written Aijalon and Ajalon, is a valley in the lowland of the Shephelah in Israel.

The Ayalon Valley has been an important route connecting the coastal plain and Jerusalem for generations. Due to its location, several battles were fought in its vicinity. The Hebrew Bible gives the valley its name from Ayalon, a city that the Tribe of Dan possessed before their migration to the north. In the modern period, ancient Ayalon was identified with the former village of Yalo at the base of the Bethoron pass, which preserved the ancient, biblical name.

Today, the Ayalon Valley is home to several kibbutzim and moshavim, including Sha'alvim, Mishmar Ayalon, Nahshon, and Kfar Bin Nun. The valley is also home to Canada Park, a national park, the Yad La-Shiryon (Armored Corps Museum), Mini Israel, the Latrun Monastery and Emmaus Nicopolis, an archeological site commonly identified with Emmaus of the New Testament.

== History ==
=== Late Bronze Age ===
==== Egyptian period ====
The name of the ancient city appears as Ayaluna in the Tell el-Amarna letters, written during the last twelve years of Pharaoh Akhenaten and the first regnal year of Tutankhamun (14th century BCE). Abdi-Heba speaks of the destruction of the city by the invaders, and describes himself as "afflicted, greatly afflicted" by the calamities that had come on the land, urging the king of Egypt to hasten to his help. This event may have been connected to an attack of the Amorites, before the arrival of the Israelites under Joshua. But since the valley stretches as far to the west as to a point halfway between Sha'alvim and Latrun, the city referenced in these letters may have been any settlement in the valley.

=== Iron Age ===
In the 10th century BCE, Ajalon is mentioned in the accounts of an invasion of Canaan by the Egyptian king Sheshonk I.

== The Bible ==
=== Joshua's battle ===
The Valley of Ayalon was first mentioned in the Book of Joshua as where Joshua defeated five Amorite kings. Following his midnight march to rescue the city of Gibeon from the coalition led by the King of Jebus (Jerusalem), Joshua pursued the coalition eastward, down through the descent of Beth-horon, and then southward across the Valley of Ajalon. To allow the Israelites to complete the rout before nightfall, Joshua asked the Lord to lengthen the day by uttering the command: "Sun, stand thou still on Gibeon; and thou, Moon, in the valley of Aijalon". Joshua 10:11–14 records that God cooperated with Joshua's request.

=== Tribe of Dan ===
Following the conquest, the city of Ajalon was apportioned to the Tribe of Dan (Joshua 19:42) and was designated as one of the Levitical cities given to the Kohathites (Joshua 21:24 and 1 Chronicles 6:69). In spite of Joshua's initial victory in the Valley of Ajalon, the Amorites continued to live in the city of Ajalon (Judges 1:34–35). Constant Philistine pressure to control the valleys of the Shephelah forced the tribe of Dan to retreat westward, reducing the extent of their territory. Eventually, the Danites abandoned their initial inheritance in the Aijalon area and moved to the extreme northern part of Israel, settling in the city of Laish, which they renamed Dan (Judges 18).

The location was also the site of a great victory over the Philistines by King Saul and his son Jonathan. After a daring attack by Jonathan on the Philistine garrison at Michmash, they pursued the Philistines to Aijalon, a distance of fifteen miles (1 Samuel 14:31). In later years, Aijalon was inhabited by Ephraimites and Benjamites (1 Chronicles 6:69 and 1 Chronicles 8:13).

=== Kingdom of Judah ===
After the kingdom divided, Ajalon became the boundary between the kingdoms of Judah and Israel. Rehoboam, the first king of Judah, fortified the city of Aijalon, supplying officers, weapons and food provisions (2 Chronicles 11:5–12).

=== Philistia ===
The Philistines conquered Ajalon during the reign of king Ahaz (2 Chronicles 28:18).

== Identification ==
Ajalon's identification with Yalo was made by Edward Robinson during his travels in Palestine in 1838. Using the works of Jerome and Eusebius of Caesarea, who describe Aijalon as being two Roman miles from Nicopolis, while also drawing upon descriptions of Aijalon in the Old Testament and noting the philological similarities between the Arabic name and its Hebrew root, Robinson concluded that the Yalo was indeed Aijalon.

== Sites ==
Canada Park, Yad La-Shiryon, the International Center for the Study of Bird Migration and the Latrun Monastery are located in the Ayalon Valley.

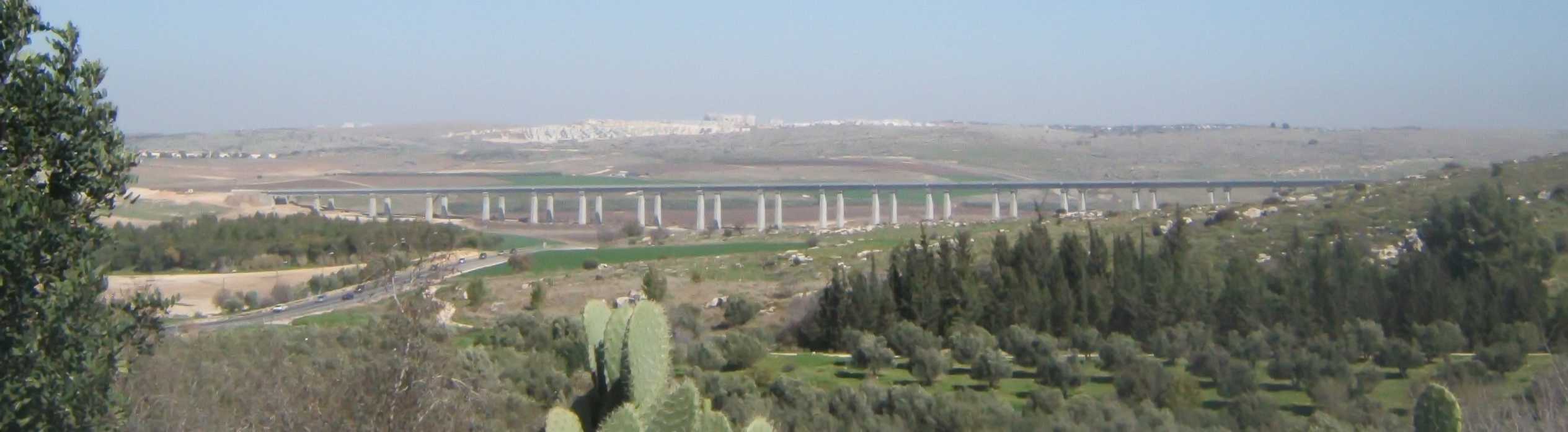
Tel Aviv–Jerusalem railway bridge, Ayalon Valley

== See also ==
- Tel Aviv–Jerusalem railway
- Geography of Israel
- Cities in the Book of Joshua
- Ayalon River

== Bibliography ==
- Robinson, Edward and Eli Smith (1860). Biblical Researches in Palestine and Adjacent Regions: A Journal of Travels in the Year 1838. Crocker and Brewster.
- Robinson, Edward and Eli Smith (1856). Later Biblical Researches in Palestine and Adjacent Regions: A Journal of Travels in the Year 1852. J. Murray.
