= Naksa =

Flight of Palestinians in the aftermath of the Six-Day War

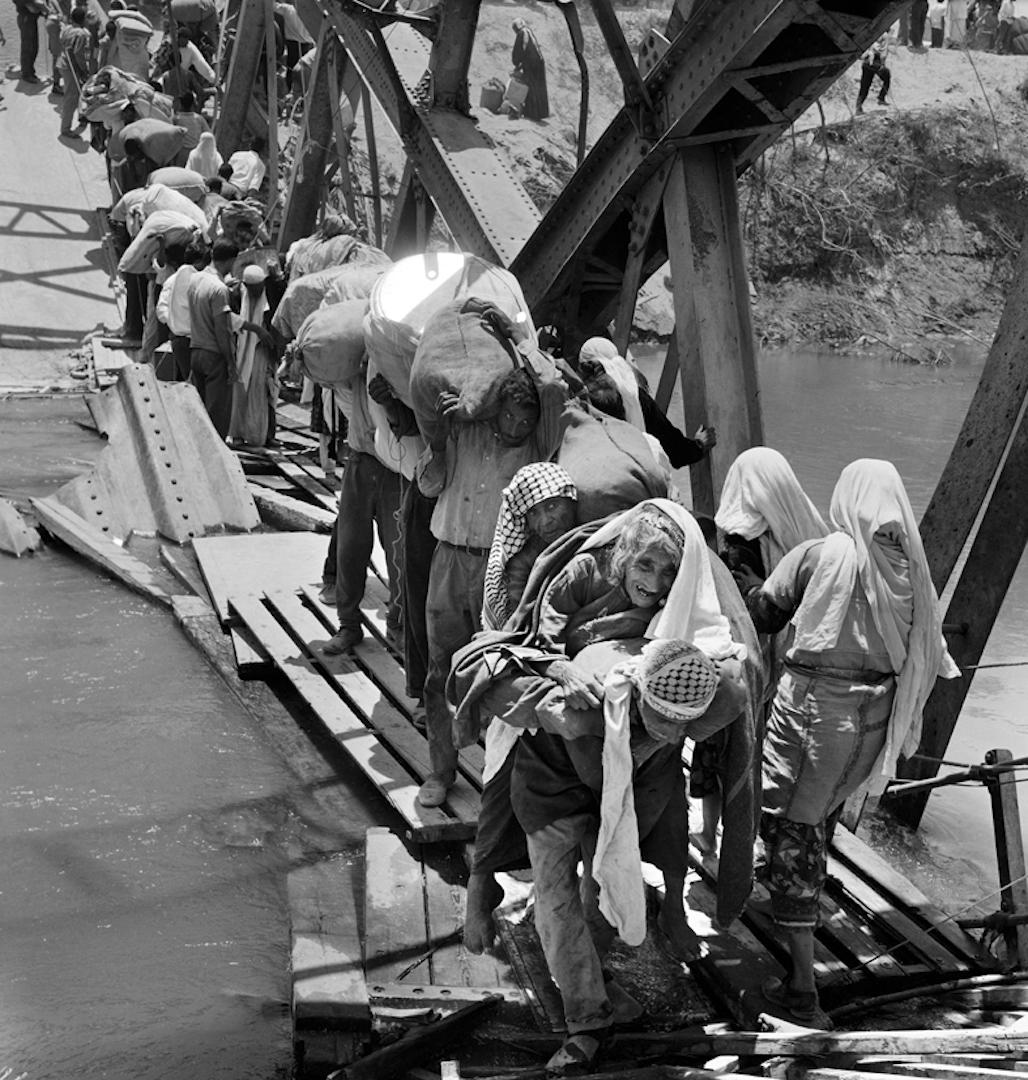
Palestinian refugees flee to Jordan, crossing the destroyed Allenby Bridge, 1967

The Naksa (Arabic: النكسة, "the setback") was the displacement of around 280,000 to 325,000 Palestinians from the West Bank and the Gaza Strip, when the territories were captured by Israel in the 1967 Six-Day War. A number of Palestinian villages were destroyed by the Israeli military, such as Imwas, Yalo, Bayt Nuba, Beit Awwa, and Al-Jiftlik, among others.

== Terminology ==
The word naksa (Arabic: نَكْسَة), meaning "relapse (in an illness); reverse (which one suffers), set-back, debacle," is an Arabic verbal noun (مصدر, maṣdar) of instance (اسم مرة, ism marra) of the verb nakasa (نَكَسَ), meaning "to turn around, turn over, invert, reverse, turn upside down; to lower, withdraw, retract, pull in; to cause a relapse (of an illness)."

The term as applied to the 1967 Arab–Israeli War was coined by journalist and editor Mohammad Hassanein Heykal, a close confidant of Gamal Abdel Nasser, in what Sherene Seikaly describes as a "rhythmic analogue to, but less injurious than, the Nakba or catastrophe". Constantin Zureiq, the Syrian historian who coined the term an-nakba, rejected the language and framework of a "setback" and insisted that 1967 was Nakba again.

== Background ==
Historian Tom Segev writes that "the hope of moving the Arabs of Palestine to other states had been a constant factor in the Zionist movement", and that "during British rule, Zionist leaders looked into various ways of paying Arabs to move to distant provinces." During the 1948 Palestine war, there were major expulsions of Palestinians, which resulted in ~750,000 Palestinian refugees. Approximately 145,000 of those expelled in 1967 were already refugees from the 1948 displacement. After the 1948 Arab–Israeli War, the West Bank was annexed to Jordan and the Gaza Strip became an unrecognized client state of Egypt known as the All-Palestine Protectorate until its dissolution in 1959.

=== Six-Day War ===
In April 1967, Israel and Syria engaged in a border skirmish that culminated in the downing of six Syrian MiG fighters near the Golan Heights. Shortly thereafter, after receiving misleading reports about IDF activity on the Israeli-Syrian border from the Soviet Union, Egypt expelled UNEF peacekeepers from the Sinai Peninsula and later blockaded the Straits of Tiran. Roughly two weeks later, Israel responded with a surprise attack against the air forces of Egypt, Jordan, and Syria, beginning the Six-Day War. Following Israel's victory in the war, it occupied several territories that had previously belonged to its neighbors under the newly established Israeli Military Governorate.

== Naksa ==
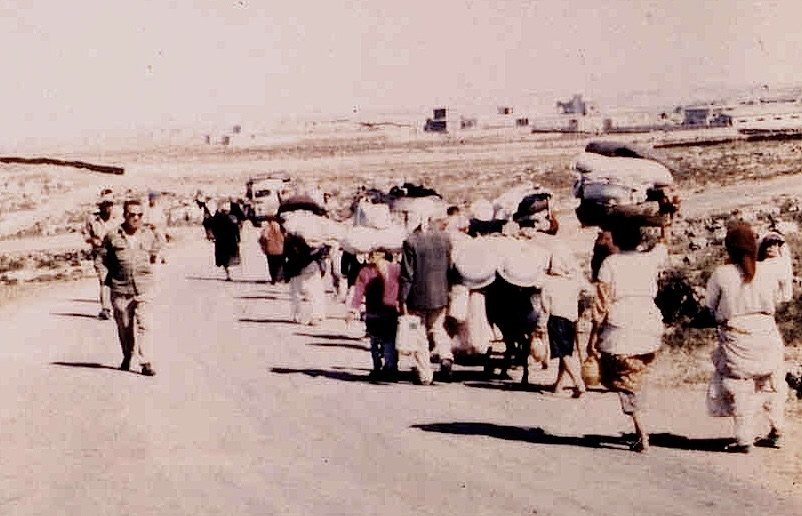
Israeli soldiers expelling the residents of Imwas

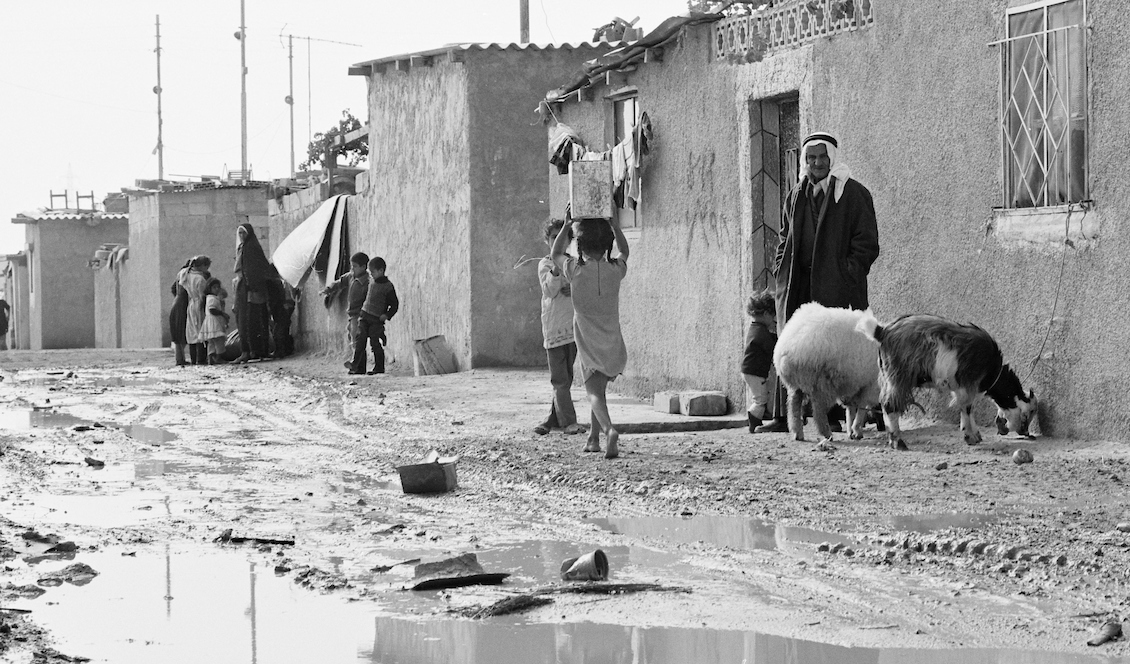
The Talbieh refugee camp in Jordan, 1983. Talbieh camp was established in 1968 to accommodate refugees from the Naksa

By December 1967, 245,000 had fled from the West Bank and Gaza Strip into Jordan, 11,000 had fled from the Gaza Strip to Egypt and 116,000 Palestinians and Syrians had fled from the Golan Heights further into Syria. (Note: McDowall, "By December, 245,000 had fled from the West Bank and Gaza Strip across the Jordan, 116,000 had fled from the Golan further into Syria, and 11,000 had left Gaza for Egypt. Of these 145,000 were UNRWA refugees uprooted for the second time. Many more left in the following months, either forcibly expelled by the occupying authorities or choosing not to live under Israeli military government. Over 300,000 probably left Palestine as a result of the 1967 war.") Until 1967, roughly half of all Palestinians still lived within the boundaries of former Mandatory Palestine, but after 1967 the majority lived as refugees in other countries.

The refugee camps of Aqabat Jaber, ʿEin as-Sultan, and Nu‘aymah, whose residents were refugees from the 1948 Palestinian expulsions, were almost entirely emptied, with approximately 50,000 people having fled or been expelled to Jordan. (Note: Masalha 2003, "Between 1949 and 1967 the Palestinian population in the West Jordan Valley was dominated by three huge refugee camps surrounding the town of Jericho: ‘Ayn Sultan, Nu‘aymah and ‘Aqbat Jabir. The residents of these camps had been driven out from present-day Israel in 1948-9. During the 1967 hostilities or shortly after virtually all residents of these camps, approximately 50,000 people, fled or were expelled to the East Bank")

A United Nations Special Committee heard allegations of the destruction of over 400 Arab villages, but no evidence in corroboration was furnished to the Special Committee to investigate Israeli practices affecting the human rights of the population of the occupied territories. (Note: Para 57: "appearing in the Sunday Times (London) on 11 October 1970, where reference is made not only to the villages of Jalou, Beit Nuba, and Imwas, also referred to by the Special Committee in its first report, but in addition to villages like Surit, Beit Awwa, Beit Mirsem and El-Shuyoukh in the Hebron area and Jiflik, Agarith and Huseirat, in the Jordan Valley. The Special Committee has ascertained that all these villages have been completely destroyed". Para 58: "the village of Nebi Samwil was in fact destroyed by Israeli armed forces on March 22, 1971.") In 1971, this UN committee published a report in which it stated that:

On the basis of the testimony placed before it or obtained by it in the course of its investigations, the Special Committee had been led to conclude that the Government of Israel is deliberately carrying out policies aimed at preventing the population of the occupied territories from returning to their homes and forcing those who are in their homes in the occupied territories to leave, either by direct means such as deportation or indirectly by attempts at undermining their morale or through the offer of special inducements, all with the ultimate object of annexing and settling the occupied territories. The Special Committee considers the acts of the Government of Israel in furtherance of these policies to be the most serious violation of human rights that has come to its attention. The evidence shows that this situation has deteriorated since the last mission of the Special Committee in 1970.

After the IDF's psychological warfare unit made a visit to Qalqilya and many of the residents had fled, the UN representative Nils-Göran Gussing noted that 850 of the town's 2,000 houses were demolished. (Note: Segev 2007, "The Kalkilya residents had left their homes because the IDF called upon them to do so. "The people from psychological warfare turned up in the middle of the night with loudspeakers," recounted Colonel Ze'ev Shaham in an official inquiry. "I sent them to the Kalkilya area---- That made [the residents] really afraid. They were told all sorts of tall tales. They got up en masse and started leaving town. The men from psychological warfare told them about an Iraqi attack that would hit them there. That helped a lot.")

== Commemoration ==
The Naksa is commemorated annually on Naksa Day, a day of remembrance for the events of the 1967 displacement.

== Historiography ==
Historian Nur Masalha wrote in 2003 that: "In contrast to the large number of books written on the Palestinian refugee exodus of 1948, only meagre historical research has been carried out on the 1967 exodus."

== See also ==
- Expulsion of Palestinians from Kuwait (1990–91)
- Palestinian diaspora
