= Association of Americans and Canadians in Israel =

Association of Americans and Canadians in Israel (AACI) is a non-profit organization of American and Canadian Jews who have made Aliyah to Israel. The AACI is a resource center for Israel's English-speaking population. AACI assists its members with various facets of Aliyah and absorption into Israeli society. AACI has 5 branches throughout the country that offer absorption counseling services and social and cultural programs. AACI is funded mainly by program and membership fees along with donations.

== History ==
AACI was established in 1951. It runs numerous program for the benefit of English-speaking immigrants from North America. In 1957, it sponsored housing projects for immigrants from the West in Kfar HaRoeh, Holon and Herzliya Pituah. Another area of activity is consumer protection. In the 1970s, AACI organized appeals to the U.S. State Department to enable immigrants from America to retain their citizenship. It developed an English tutoring program to assist new immigrants from Russia and Ethiopia, launched a campaign for anti-smoking legislation and lobbied for the inclusion of immigrants over the age of 60 in the National Health Insurance Law. In the past decade, it has launched public awareness campaigns to eliminate smoking in public areas and encourage the use of bicycle helmets. It lobbied for the inclusion of immigrants over 60 in the National Health Insurance Law and the inclusion of Western immigrants in basket of services granted to new immigrants. AACI initiated the construction of "Nofim", the first assisted living facility in Israel, which became the standard model for all assisted living facilities throughout the country.

In response to the dire need for housing shortly after the country's founding, AACI sponsored housing projects in 1957 for Western immigrants in Kfar HaRoeh, Holon and Herzliya Pituah. In 1958, AACI sponsored the first cooperative housing project in Nayot, Jerusalem. Other building projects include the area in French Hill, now known as "Tsameret Habira".

Marking the AACI's fiftieth anniversary, 21 American and Canadian immigrants were honored at the President's Residence in Jerusalem.

== AACI Programs ==
=== Aliyah Counseling ===
AACI has a target population of over 300,000 North American and English-speaking Israelis as well as all potential immigrants to Israel from North America. AACI counselors provide the needed services for both newly arriving Olim and Olim who have been in Israel for a longer time period to have a successful Aliyah experience. AACI is committed to assisting Olim in achieving successful klitah (absorption) through counseling, employment assistance, mortgage and emergency loan assistance, and social welfare and related services. Like similar organizations, AACI addresses the issues that impact the lives of members and their quality of life in Israel. In doing so, the AACI has become one of the preeminent voices of Israel's English speaking community.

=== Employment ===
A measure of the Aliyah process is the ability for immigrants to find employment. Among the absorption services AACI offers, the highest demand from members is for employment services. English-speaking job seekers use counseling, resume adaptation for the Israeli market, job listings, seminars, and networking. AACI provides these services to English-speaking immigrants.

=== Culture ===
AACI offers an array of country-wide tours, art exhibits, and organized trips to music and theater productions as well as library services throughout the country. The Jerusalem branch's new program center, the Dr. Max & Gianna Glassman Family Center, with a 200-seat auditorium an additional program rooms, can host events.

=== Libraries ===
AACI hosts an English lending library, a library for the Visually Impaired, a DVD library and media club at its Jerusalem headquarters. The AACI English Language Library for the Visually Impaired and Homebound is the only one of its kind serving all of Israel. This volunteer-run English language library provides services for people who suffer from vision disabilities of all ages.

=== Memorial Program ===
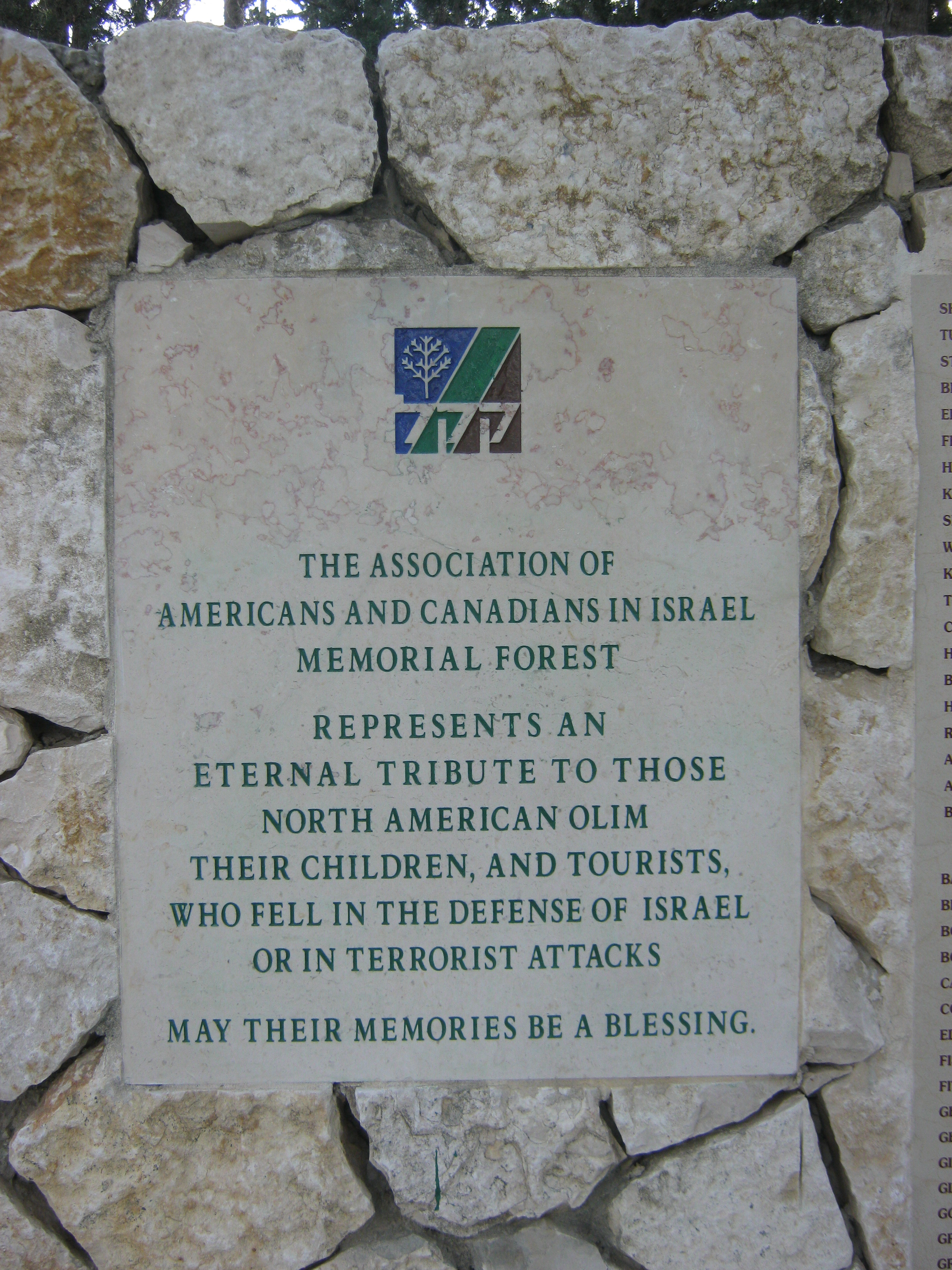
AACI Memorial Forest plaque

AACI hosts an annual memorial service in honor of Americans and Canadians who have fallen in the service of the State of Israel or as victims of terrorist attacks. The memorial to over 300 people takes place at the AACI Memorial Forest, near Sha'ar Hagai. The Memorial also educates the next generation of English-speaking Jews about those who died in such events.

=== Kosher Travel ===
AACI offers kosher international trips throughout the year, ranging from African safaris, cruises to Italy, and tours through the Baltics. Local trips throughout Israel include study and seminar weekends to various historical sites within Israel.

=== Rusty Mike ===
AACI's Rusty Mike Radio Internet radio station was established in 2009. Operating out of Jerusalem, this English-language radio station educates listeners about the realities and practicalities of day-to-day life within Israel.

== Awards and recognition ==
In 1990, the AACI received the Knesset Award for Improving the Quality of Life in Israel.
