= Imwas =

Imwas عِمواس Emmaus 'Amwas Amwas
- Village
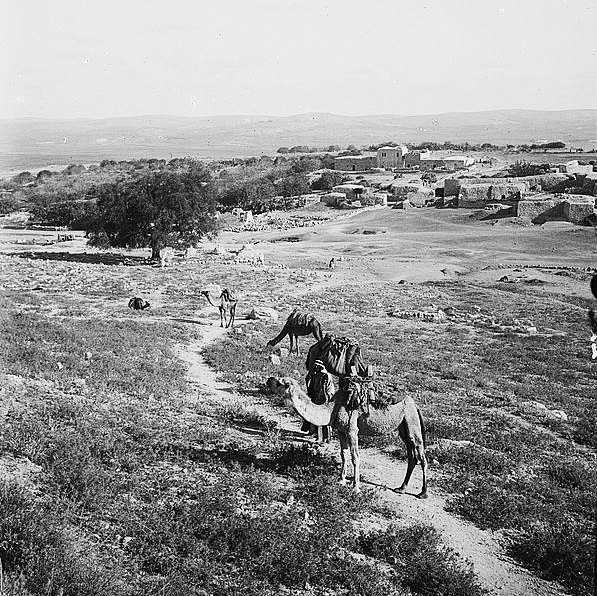
- Imwas, early 20th century
- Etymology: possibly "thermal springs"
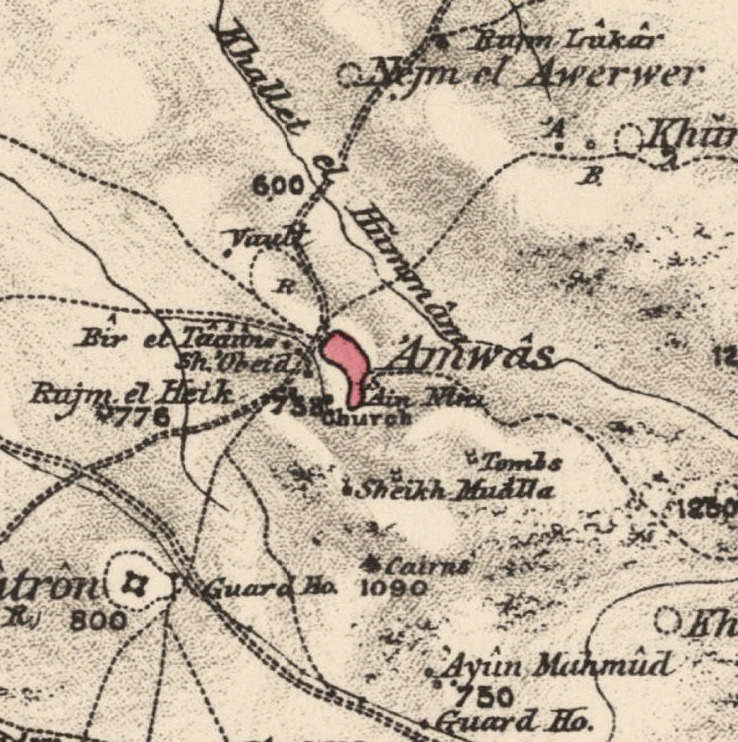
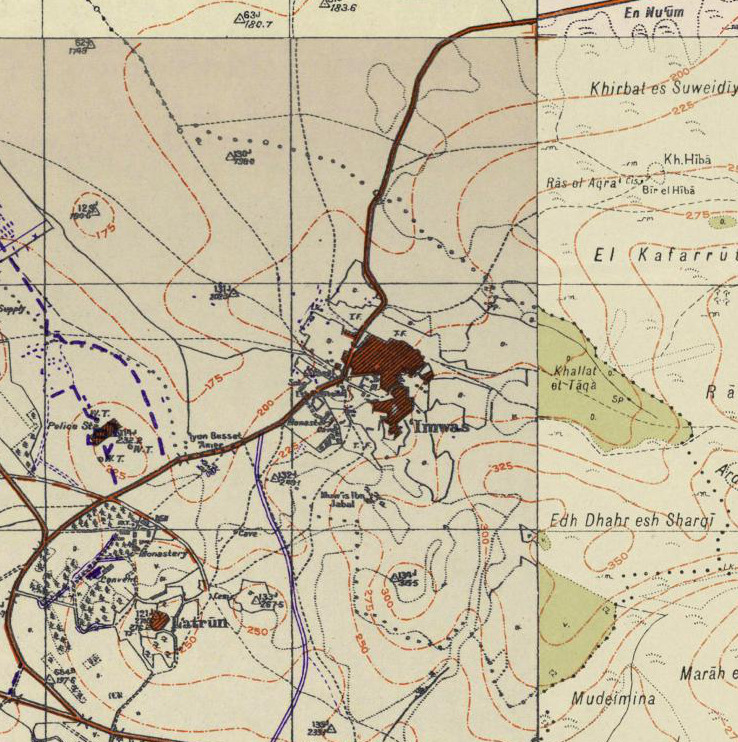
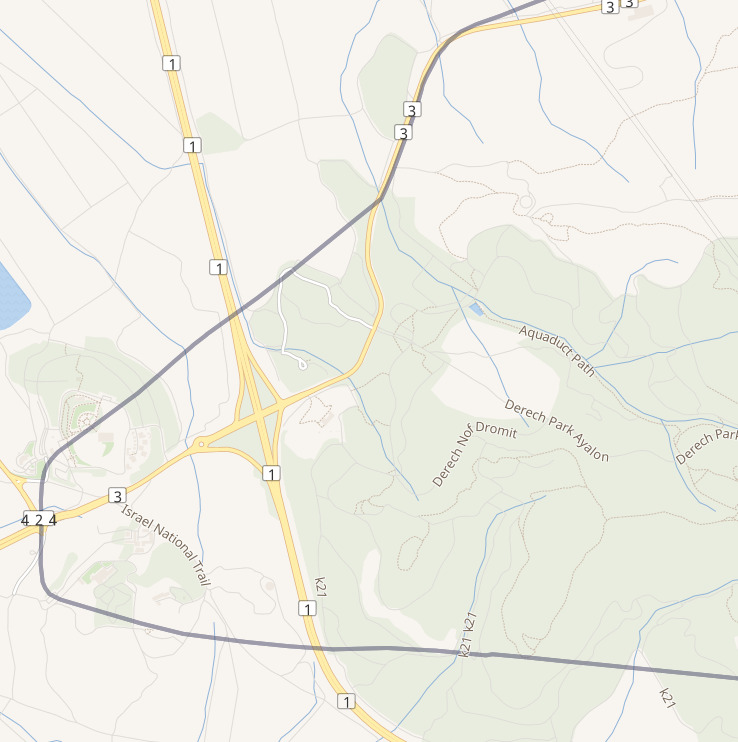
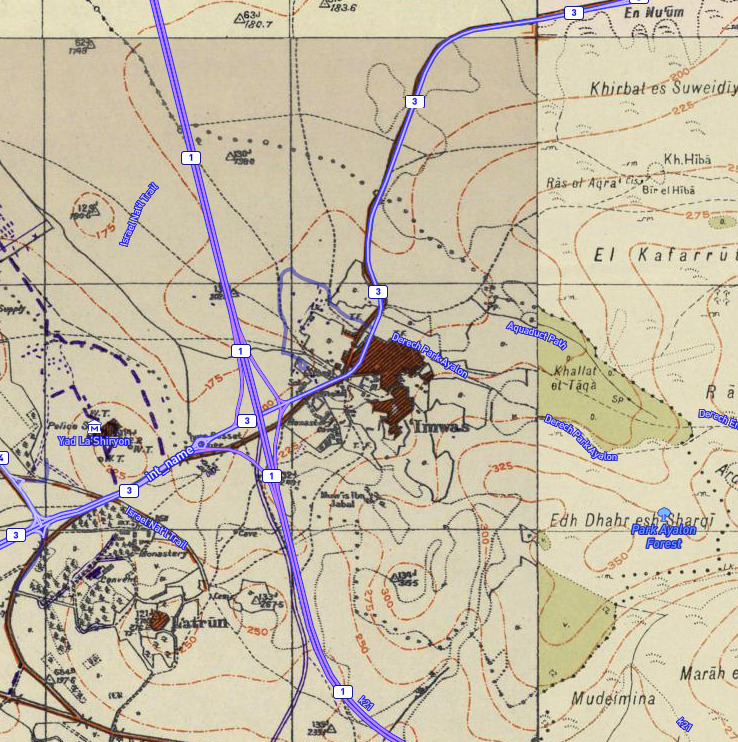
- 1870s map 1940s map modern map 1940s with modern overlay map A series of historical maps of the area around Imwas (click the buttons)

- Location within Mandatory Palestine
- Coordinates: 31°50′26″N 34°59′30″E
- Palestine grid: 149/138
- Geopolitical entity: Mandatory Palestine
- Subdistrict: Ramle
- Date of depopulation: 7 June 1967

Population
  - Total: 2,015
- Cause(s) of depopulation: Expulsion by Israeli forces
- Current Localities: Canada Park

Imwas or Emmaus (Arabic: عِمواس, romanized: ʿImwās), known in classical times as Nicopolis (Ancient Greek: Νικόπολις, lit. 'City of Victory'), is a former Palestinian village ethnically cleansed by Israel, located 12 kilometres (7.5 mi) southeast of the city of Ramla and 26 kilometres (16 mi) from Jerusalem in the Latrun salient of the West Bank. It is traditionally (possibly from as early as the 3rd century, but probably incorrectly) identified with the biblical Emmaus. In 1967, the village's population was expelled and its buildings razed by Israeli forces as part of the Naksa during the Six-Day War.

After the 1948 Arab-Israeli war, Imwas fell under Jordanian rule. Its population at the time was predominantly Muslim although there was a Palestinian Christian minority. During the 1967 Six-Day War, IDF troops ethnically cleansed Emwas and the village structures were destroyed, forming a part of the larger Naksa. Imwas and the area surrounding Latrun were unilaterally 'annexed' by Israel along with the neighbouring villages of Yalo and Bayt Nuba. Today the area of the former village lies within Canada Park, which was established by the Jewish National Fund in 1973.

== Etymology ==
The name of the modern village was pronounced ʿImwās by its inhabitants. Arabic literary sources indicate the name was formerly pronounced ʿAmwās and ʿAmawās, the latter form being transcribed by the Syrian geographer Yakut (1179–1229).

In the time of Jerome, the Semitic name of Emmaus Nicopolis was ʿAmmaôs or ʿEmmaus, both beginning with an ʿāyin (ʿ). Following Clermont-Ganneau, Moshe Sharon argued that the Arabic name more faithfully approximates the town's original ancient name when compared against the name as transcribed in the Talmud, where it begins with an alef (ʾ). Kitchener and Conder suggested the name Emmaus is derived from the ancient Hebrew ḥammat, a thermal spring.

According to a tradition held by local fellahin in the 19th century, the village's name is related to an epidemic that killed the ancient Jewish inhabitants of the village, but they were miraculously brought back to life after Neby Uzair's visited the place and prayed to God to revive the victims. The fellahin described the pestilience as amm-mou-asa, which according to Clermont-Ganneau, roughly means "it was extended generally and was an affliction". Clermont-Ganneau thought this local etymology was "evidently artificial".

== History ==
=== Classical antiquity ===
Emmaus is mentioned in the first Book of the Maccabees as the site where Judas Maccabeus defeated the Syrian Seleucid general Gorgias in the 2nd century BCE and subsequently fortified by General Bacchides in 160 BCE. It replaced Gezer as the head of a toparchy in 47 BCE.

Edward Robinson relates that its inhabitants were enslaved by Gaius Cassius Longinus while Josephus relates that the city, called Άμμoὺς, was burned to the ground by Publius Quinctilius Varus after the death of Herod the Great in 4 BCE.

Imwas has been identified as the site of ancient Emmaus, where according to the Gospel of Luke (24:13-35), Jesus appeared to a group of his disciples, including Cleopas, after his death and resurrection.

Reduced to a small market town, its importance was recognized by the Emperor Vespasian, who established a fortified camp there in 68 CE to house Legio V Macedonica, populating it with 800 veterans. In 131 CE, the city was destroyed by an earthquake. It was rebuilt and renamed Nicopolis ("City of Victory") by Elagabalus in 221 CE, becoming the chief polis in a region that bore its name. Robinson writes that the town was rebuilt "by the exertions of the writer Julius Africanus." In 222 CE, a basilica was erected there, which was rebuilt first by the Byzantines and later by the Crusaders.

In the 4th century, the city served as an episcopal see. Remains of a Samaritan synagogue — including a limestone capital carved with two inscriptions, one in Hebrew (ברוך שמו לעולם, "Blessed be His Name forever") and the other in Greek (EIC ΘEOC, "One God") — indicate the presence of a Samaritan community in Emmaus-Nicopolis.

Described by Eusebius in his Onomasticon, Jerome is also thought to have referred to the town and the building of a shrine-church therein, when he writes that the Lord "consecrated the house of Cleopas as a church." In the 5th century, a second tradition associated with Emmaus emerges in the writings of Sozomen, who mentions a fountain outside the city where Jesus and his disciples bathed their feet, thus imbuing it with curative powers.

=== Early Muslim period ===
==== Rashidun and Umayyad periods ====
After the conquest of Palestine by forces of the Rashidun Caliphate in the 7th century, a military camp was established at ʿImwas, which formed part of the newly created administrative district of Jund al-Urdunn. This jund or military camp, among others established in Tiberias and Homs, was made up of Arab soldiers, who were soon to become citizens of the newly conquered areas. The soldiers brought their wives and concubines to the camps, some of whom, according to Philip K. Hitti, were no doubt captured native women.

The governmental framework of the Byzantine rule was preserved, though a commander-in-chief/governor-general was appointed from among the new conquerors to head the government, combining executive, judicial and military roles in his person.

In 639, the Plague of Amwas began and spread from there, killing some 20,000 people, including the commander-in-chief Abu Ubayda ibn al-Jarrah and his successor, Yazid. The Rashid Caliph Umar appointed Yazid's younger brother Mu'awiya to the position of commander-in-chief in 640, and he served as the governor of Syria for 20 years before becoming the Umayyad caliph. Studies on the impact of the plague note that it was responsible for a massive depopulation of the countryside, with the consequence that the new Arab rulers, particularly under the subsequent Umayyad Caliphate, were prompted to intervene more directly in the affairs of these areas than they had intended. Until as late as the 19th century, a well in the village was known locally as "The Plague Well" (بئر الطاعون), its name suggesting a derivation from these events.

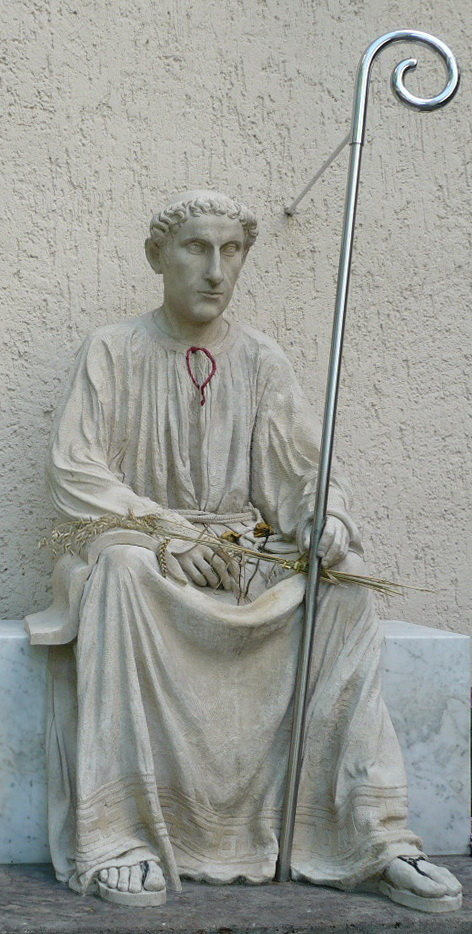
Statue of Saint Willibald, who came on a Holy Land pilgrimage in 723

In 723, Saint Willibald visited Imwas. He was the son of West Saxon Richard the Pilgrim and Wuna of Wessex, brother of Winnibald and Walpurga, all of them canonised by the Church. Later Willibald's uncle (his mother's brother), Saint Boniface, recruited his nephews in Rome to assist him in evangelizing the still-pagan Germans. Willibald eventually became the first bishop of Eichstätt. In his writings, he notes that the church, which he thought lay over the house of Cleopas, was still intact; he also recalls and describes the miraculous water source mentioned by Sozomen. Hygeburg of Heidenheim, Bavaria, a nun who visited Palestine in the 8th century, mentions both the church and the fountain in Imwas in her work on The Life of St. Willibald.

==== Abbasid and Fatimid periods ====
By the 9th century, the administrative districts had been redrawn and Imwas was the capital of a sub-district within the larger district of Jund Filastin. The geographer al-Maqdisi (c. 945-1000) recalls that ʿImwas had been the capital of its province, while noting, "that the population [was] removed therefrom to be nearer to the sea, and more in the plain, on account of the wells."

By 1009, the church in Imwas had been destroyed by Yaruk, the governor of Ramla, after the Fatimid caliph of Egypt, al-Hakim bi-Amr Allah, ordered the destruction of Christian sites, affecting some 30,000 churches in the territory under his rule. Carsten Peter Thiede describes this destruction and other acts of suppression against Christian worship as one of the main impetuses behind the First Crusade, in which, "Saving Christian sites and guaranteeing access to them was paramount."

=== Crusader period ===
William of Tyre, describing the arrival of the armies of the First Crusade to Imwas from Ramla in 1099, notes the abundance of water and fodder available at the site. Throughout the 12th century, Imwas continued to be identified as the Biblical Emmaus by Eastern Orthodox Christians. For example, in 1106-7, Abbot Daniel writes of Imwas: "Once there was a large village here, and a church was built here, but now all is destroyed by the pagans and the village of Emmaus is empty. It was near the road beyond the mountains on the right hand as you go from Jerusalem to Jaffa." John Phocas (c. 1185) also located Emmaus in the same position. Conversely, Western sources in the late 12th century identified Biblical Emmaus with another village closer to Jerusalem: Qaryat al-'Inab or Abu Ghosh. Denys Pringle and Peter E. Leach attribute the reasons for this shift as stemming from a difference in the description of the distance between Emmaus and Jerusalem in the Gospel texts, versus the distance as transcribed in the earliest Greek Gospel codices. In the Gospel texts, more widely embraced by the West, the distance is transcribed as 60 stades, whereas the Codex Sinaiticus, which was known to Eusebius and Jerome, places the distance at 160 stades.

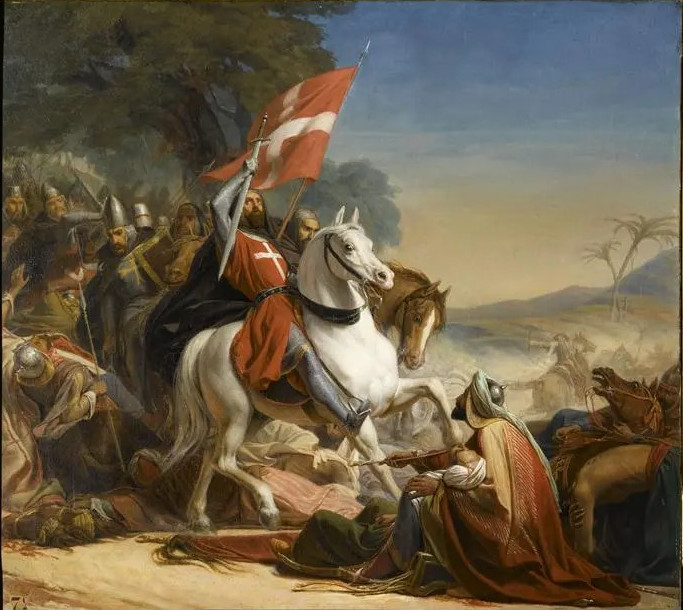
Raymond du Puy in the Hall of Crusades, Versailles.

The identification of Biblical Emmaus with two villages in the 12th century has led to some confusion among modern historians when apprehending historical documents from this time. Generally speaking, however, Abu Ghosh was referred to by the Latin Biblical name for Emmaus, Castellum Emmaus, whereas Imwas was referred to simply as Emmaus. In 1141, Robert of Sinjil leased the "land of Emmaus", which included Imwas and six other villages, to Raymond of Le Puy, the master of the Hospitallers for 500 bezants a year. The same year, William, the Patriarch of Jerusalem granted half of the tithes from six surrounding villages to the Hospitallers, one of these villages was nearby Khulda. In February 1151 or 1152 the Hospitallers were still leasing, but the terms of the lease were modified. An 1186 reference to a "bailiff of Emmaus" named Bartholomew suggests that the Hospitallers had a commandery in Imwas. There is also archaeological and documentary evidence that suggests that the local Eastern Christian population continued to live in Imwas during this time, and likely attended services alongside the Crusaders at the parish church dedicated to St. George which was constructed in the village by the latter on the site of the ruins of the earlier churches.

Imwas was likely abandoned by Crusaders in 1187 and unlike the neighboring villages of Beit Nuba, Yalo, Yazur and Latrun, it is not mentioned in chronicles describing the Third Crusade of 1191-2, and it is unclear whether it was reoccupied by the Hospitallers between 1229 and 1244. The village was re-established just north of where the church had been located.

=== Mamluk period ===
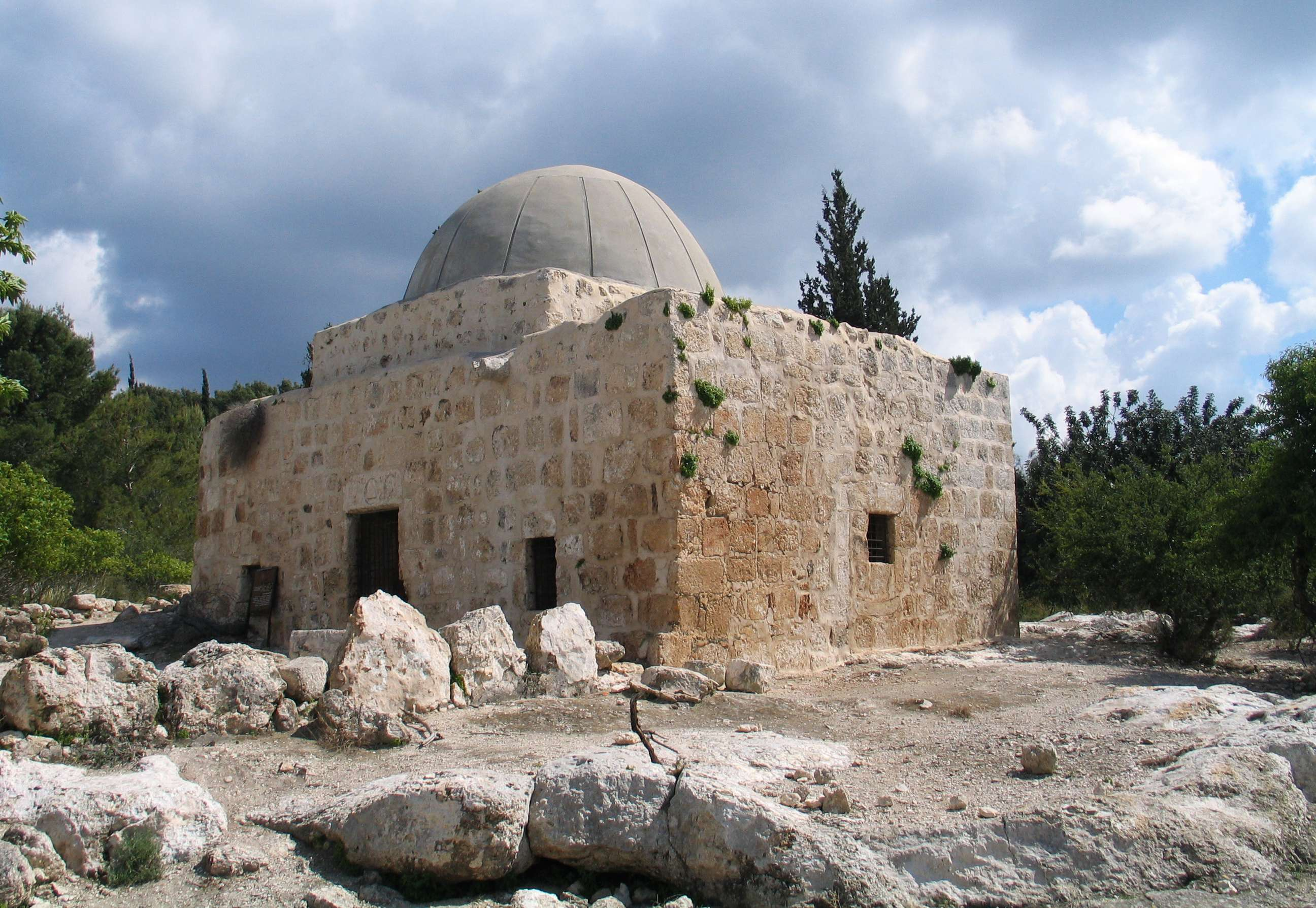
Maqam of Sheikh Mu'alla

The Maqam of Sheikh Mu'alla had an endowment text (now lost), dating it to 687 AH/1289-1290 CE. Clermont-Ganneau described it:

The most important, and most conspicuous Mussulman sanctuary in 'Amwas is that which stands on the hill some 500 metres to the south of the village. It appears on the P.E. Fund Map under the name of Sheikh Mo'alla, a name which is interpreted in the name lists by "lofty." I have heard the name pronounced Ma'alleh, and also Mu'al, or Mo'al; but these are merely shorter or less accurate forms; the complete name, as I have on several occasions noted, is Sheikh Mu'al iben Jabal. Although they do not know anything about its origin, the fellahin have an extraordinary reverence for this sanctuary; they declare that it is often the scene of a supernatural apparition; that of an old man, with a long white beard, mounted on a green mare, and holding in his right hand a pike [karbeh) wherewith he slays his enemies. This is the Sheikh, of whom they stand in holy awe. This legend, and the name of the personage, puzzled me greatly, and it was not without some trouble that I discovered the answer to the riddle. It is directly derived from the historical memory of the famous Plague of 'Amwas, in connection with the Plague-well. The Arab* historians tell us, as I have already explained, that the epidemic originated at 'Amwas, whence it took the name by which it is known in their chronicles. Among the most illustrious victims of the disease was one of the companions of Mahomet, Abu 'Abd er Rahman Muadh ben Jabal, who was entrusted by 'Omar with the organisation of the conquered country. This personage died beyond Jordan, and was buried there. (As for the exact place in which he was buried, a topographical question connected with that of the place where Jesus was baptized, see my Recucil d'Archeologie Orientale, Vol. I, p. 344, et sqq. I may add that instead of Deir Fakhur, many Mohammedan writers, for example Beladhory and Yakut, call the place where Mu'adh ben Jabal died and was buried, Ukhuana...... I have established the exact position of Ukhuana, and its identity with the Cauan of the Crusaders, in my Études d'Archéologie Orientale, Vol. II, p. 123.) .....We may presume that originally this monument was merely commemorative, and that local tradition has at last wrongly ended in regarding it as the real tomb of this celebrated personage, inferring from his having succumbed to the 'Plague of 'Amwas' that he died and was buried at 'Amwas itself. However, the mistake of the legend on this point must be a very ancient one, for as early as the twelfth century, Aly el Herewy has the following passage : " One sees at 'Amwas the tombs of a great number of companions of the prophets and of tabis who died of the Plague. Among them (sic) is mentioned 'Abd er Rahman ibn {sic) Mu'adh ben Jabal and his children. ...

=== Ottoman period ===
==== Early Ottoman period ====
Imwas came under the rule of the Ottoman Empire in the early 16th century and by the end of that century, the church built by the Crusaders had been converted into a mosque, which itself stood for almost a century before falling into ruin. In the 1596 tax record its population was reported as 24 Muslim families. They paid a fixed tax rate of 25% on agricultural products, including wheat, barley, summer crops, vineyards, fruit trees, goats and beehives, in addition to "occasional revenues"; a total of 3,600 akçe. Part of the revenue went to a waqf.

==== Late Ottoman period ====
Edward Robinson visited Imwas during his mid-19th century travels in Ottoman Syria and Palestine. He describes it as "a poor hamlet consisting of a few mean houses." He also mentions that there are two fountains of living water and that the one lying just beside the village must be that mentioned by Sozomen in the 5th century, Theophanes in the 6th, and by Willibald in the 8th. The ruins of the "ancient church" are described by Robinson as lying just south of the built-up area of the village at that time.

In 1863, Victor Guérin visited and identified it as ancient Emmaus Nicopolis.

Charles Simon Clermont-Ganneau also visited Imwas in the late 19th century and describes a local tradition centered around a bathhouse dating to the Roman era. The upper part of the structure, which protruded above the ground, was known to locals as "Sheikh Obaid" and was considered to be the burial place of Abu Ubayd who succumbed to the plague in 639. The site served as both a religious sanctuary and cemetery until the town's depopulation in 1967.

In 1875, the Carmelites of Bethlehem acquired the site containing the ruins of the church of Imwas. The debris was removed in 1887-8, and excavations were conducted intermittently from November 1924 to September 1930 by the École biblique et archéologique française de Jérusalem. In 1884, Dr. C. Schick discovered a baptistry with a well-preserved font dating to the 4th century. The square building housed an apse and a shallow cruciform basin where it is thought that those undergoing baptismal rites would stand.

In 1883, the PEF's Survey of Western Palestine described Imwas as an adobe village, of moderate size.

=== British Mandate period ===
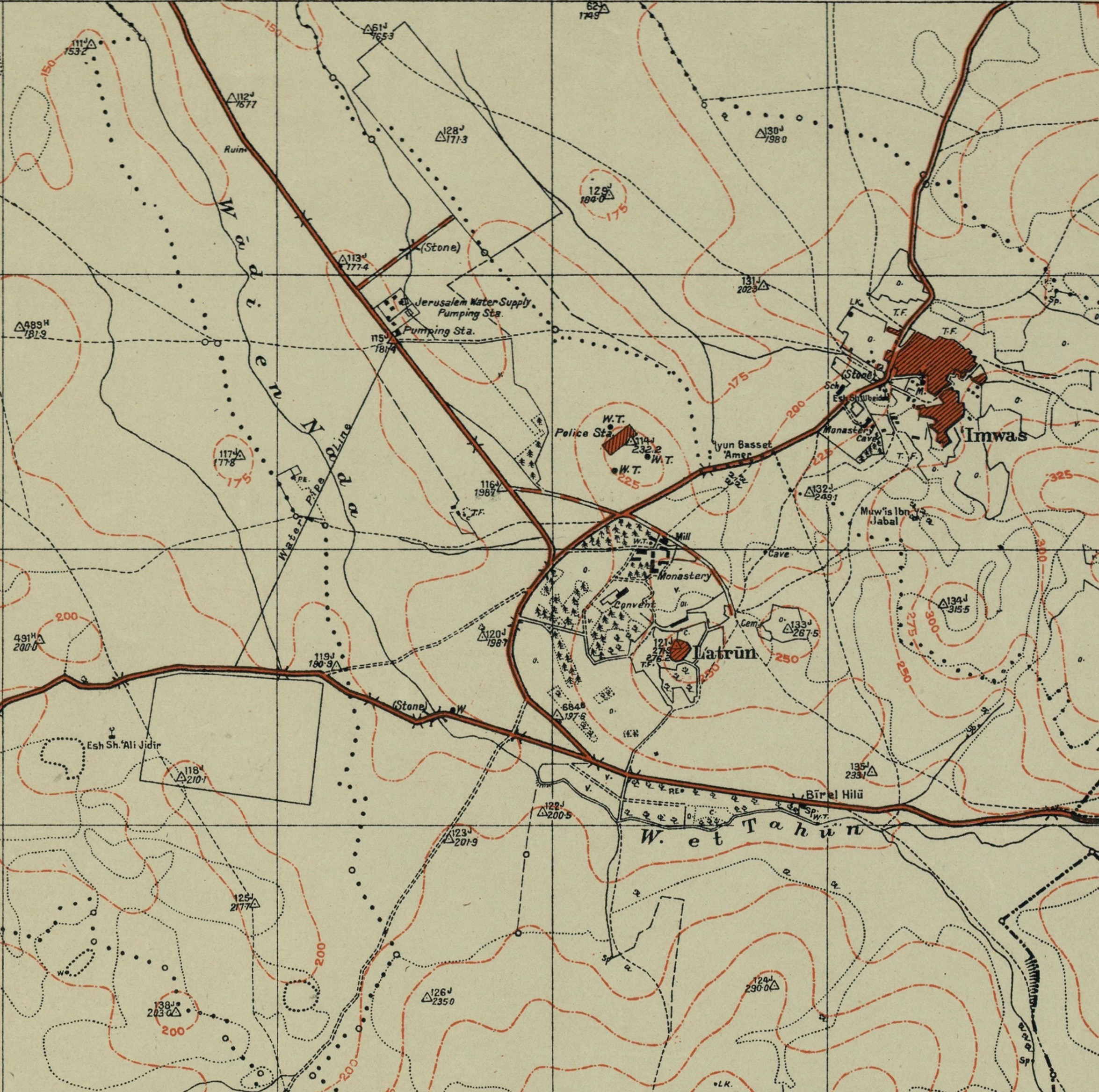
Imwas (Anwas) 1942 1:20,000

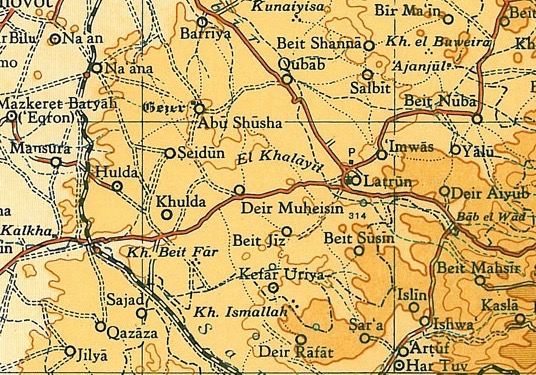
Imwas 1945 1:250,000

In the 1922 census of Palestine conducted by the British Mandate authorities, Imwas had a population of 824, all Muslim. This had increased by the time of the 1931 census to 1,029, 2 Christians and 1,027 Muslim, in 224 houses.

In the 1945 statistics the population of Imwas was 1,450, all Muslims, while the total land area was 5,151 dunams, according to an official land and population survey. Of this, 606 dunams were allocated for plantations and irrigable land, 3,612 for cereals, while 148 dunams were classified as built-up areas. By 1948, the population had dwindled to 1,100 Arabs.

=== Jordanian period ===
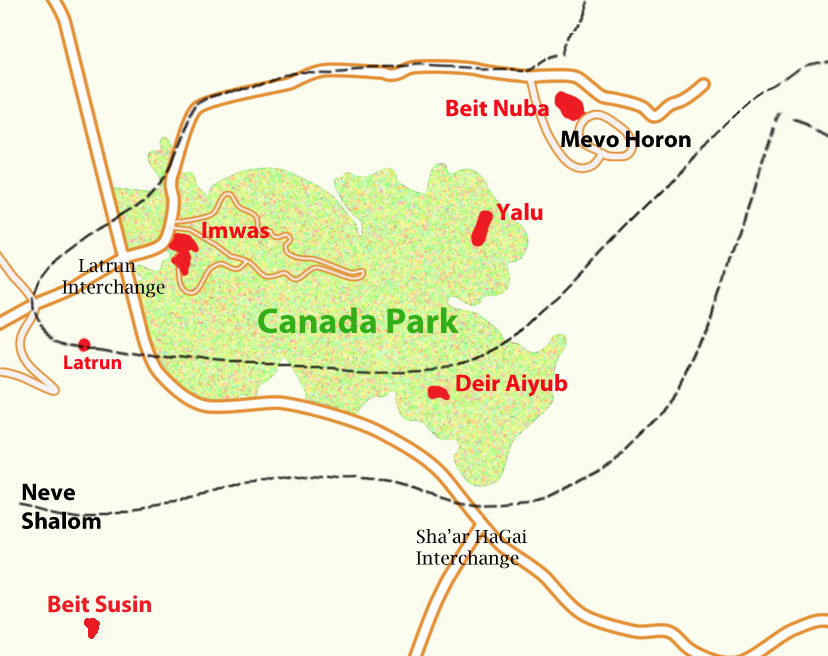
Map of Dayr Ayyub, Imwas, Yalo, Bayt Nuba and the armistice lines

During the 1948 Palestine War, the village held strategic importance due to its location on the Latrun salient, affording control over the road to Jerusalem. Arab Liberation Army forces were there from April to the middle of May until the arrival of the Arab Legion. Israeli forces attacked the position several times but failed to gain control during the Battle of Latrun.

After the 1949 Armistice Agreements, Imwas came under Jordanian control.

The Jordanian census of 1961 found 1,955 inhabitants in Imwas.

=== Destruction and expulsion of residents ===
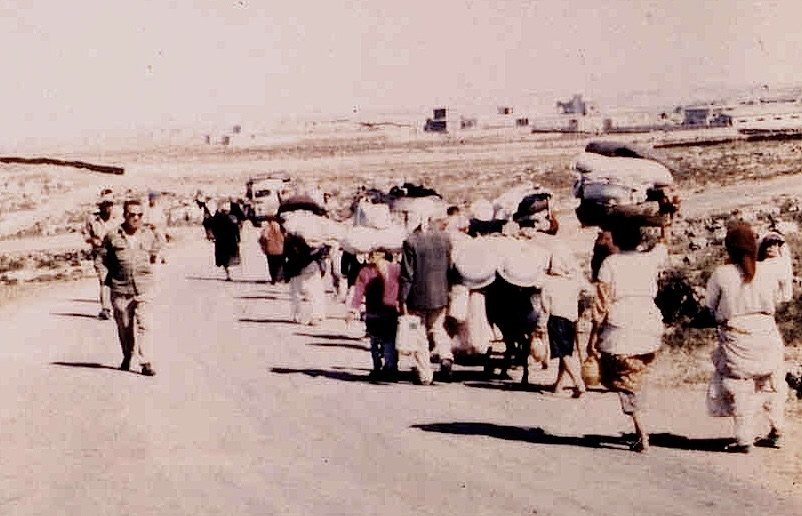
Israeli soldiers expelling residents of Imwas, 1967

The town, defended by a few Jordanian and Egyptian units, was overrun in June 1967. Its residents were expelled as part of the 1967 Palestinian expulsions and the village was destroyed on the orders of Yitzhak Rabin.

Villagers from Imwas, together with those of Yalo and Beit Nuba, numbering some 8,000, were ordered by megaphone to abandon their homes and march towards Ramallah, 32 kilometres away. Ten elderly villagers refused to leave and were never heard of again, and were presumed to have been shot or to have been buried under the demolition rubble. This exodus from the Latrun zone, during which 4 villagers died, presented a public relations problem. According to one oral account by a refugee, one week after the expulsion, villagers heard over Israeli radio that they would be allowed to return to the enclave in peace.

Those in the West Bank who tried to get back found the villages surrounded by tanks, and heard that a military order had rescinded the earlier decision, and could only stand by and watch as their houses were razed. The order, in violation of Article 53 of the Fourth Geneva Convention, came from Yitzhak Rabin. In his memoirs Dayan recalled that "(Houses were destroyed) not in battle, but as punishment . . in order to chase away the inhabitants." In response to the public relations problem, Dayan eventually agreed to allow those from Qalqiliya, Habla and Zeta to return to their homes if it was agreed in turn to block the return of the inhabitants of the Latrun villages.

Israeli newspapers of the day depicted the flight as voluntary. Israel further justified the decision by claiming that its residents had taken part in the Siege of Jerusalem two decades earlier, and that they had been present in an attack by Egyptian commandos on Lod just days before the village was taken. Dayan stated that the Latrun area fellahin were themselves not responsible for Jordanian shelling from that area during the Six Day War. The decision to destroy the houses was explained to soldiers operating there as necessary in order to "punish the nest of murderers" and stop housing infrastructure from being used in future for terrorist bases. Central Command orders issued to soldiers at the time described the 1948 failure, and the 1967 success in the following way, by writing of:

'terms of disappointment, terms of a long and painful account, which has now been settled to the last cent. Houses suddenly left. Intact. With their potted geraniums, their grapevines climbing up the balconies. The smell-of wood-burning ovens still in the air. Elderly people who have nothing more to lose, slowly straggling along.,'

In August of that year, villagers were told that they return could pick up their stored harvests with trucks. The residents of the three villages then formed a committee to negotiate their return. The villagers' request that Israel allow their leaders, who had fled to Amman, to return and negotiate on their behalf, was turned down by Dayan. Israel offered monetary compensation for the destruction of homes and the expropriation of lands. One committee leader, the father of Abu Gaush replied:

"We will not accept all the money in the world for one dunam in Imwas, and we will not accept one dunum in heaven for one dunam in Inwas!"

According to his son, he was told by his Israeli interlocutors that he had three choices: to share the fate of Sheikh Abdul Hameed Al Sayeh, the first Palestinian to be exiled by Israel after the beginning of the 1967 occupation, after he spoke up for the inalienable right of return of Palestinians; or he could choose to go to prison, or, finally, he could suck on something sweet and keep quiet; In all cases no one was allowed to return. One descendant of the expelled villagers said her father told her they were threatened with prison if they did not agree to compensation An Imwas Human Society now campaigns for the expelled villagers' rights and publicizes what they call the war crimes committed in the Latrun Enclave.

==== Aftermath and the site today ====
In 1973 the Jewish National Fund in Canada raised $5 million to establish a picnic park for Israelis in the area, which it created and still maintains. It descrfibes the area as:-

"one of the largest parks in Israel, covering an area of 7,500 acres in the biblical Ayalon Valley. At peak season, some 30,000 individuals visit the site each day,. enjoying its many play and recreational facilities and installations."

Since 2003, the Israeli NGO Zochrot ('Remember' in Hebrew) has lobbied the Jewish National Fund for permission to post signs designating the Palestinian villages in Canada Park. After petitioning the Israeli High Court, permission was granted. However, subsequently the signs have been stolen or vandalized. On June 23, 2007, Zochrot joined the refugees of the village Imwas for a tour of the remains of their village.

== Artistic representations ==
Palestinian artist Sliman Mansour made Imwas the subject of one of his paintings. The work, named for the village, was one of a series of four on destroyed Palestinian villages that he produced in 1988; the others being Yalo, Bayt Dajan and Yibna.

The destruction of Imwas and the other Latrun villages of Yalo and Beit Nuba is mentioned by Palestinian novelist Emile Habibi in his famous novel The Secret Life of Saeed the Pessoptimist.

Emwas, restoring memories is a recent documentary film in which the filmmaker makes a 3D model of the town using expertise and interviews with people who survived the exodus.

== See also ==
- List of villages depopulated during the Arab-Israeli conflict

== Bibliography ==
- Al-Baladhuri (1916). The origins of the Islamic state: being a translation from the Arabic, accompanied with annotations, geographic and historic notes of the Kitâb fitûh al-buldân of al-Imâm abu-l Abbâs Ahmad ibn-Jâbir al-Balâdhuri. Translator: Philip Khuri Hitti. New York: Columbia University.
- Ankori, G. (2006). Palestinian Art. Reaktion Books. ISBN 1-86189-259-4.
- Barag, Dan (2009). "Samaritan writing and writings". From Hellenism To Islam: Cultural and Linguistic Change in the Roman Near East. Cambridge University Press. pp. 303–323. ISBN 978-0-521-87581-3.
- Barron, J.B., ed. (1923). Palestine: Report and General Abstracts of the Census of 1922. Government of Palestine.
- Bray, R.S. (2004). Armies of Pestilence: The Impact of Disease on History. James Clarke & Co. ISBN 9780227172407.
- Bromiley, G.W. (1982). International Standard Bible Encyclopedia: E-J. Wm. B. Eerdmans Publishing. ISBN 9780802837820.
- Brownrigg, Ronald (2001). Who's Who in the New Testament. Routledge. ISBN 9780415260367.
- Clermont-Ganneau, C.S. (1899). [ARP] Archaeological Researches in Palestine 1873–1874, translated from the French by J. McFarlane. Vol. 1. London: Palestine Exploration Fund.
- Conder, C.R.; Kitchener, H.H. (1883). The Survey of Western Palestine: Memoirs of the Topography, Orography, Hydrography, and Archaeology. Vol. 3. London: Committee of the Palestine Exploration Fund. (pp. 63 -81)
- Dauphin, C. (1998). La Palestine byzantine, Peuplement et Populations. BAR International Series 726 (in French). Vol. III : Catalogue. Oxford: Archeopress. ISBN 0-860549-05-4. (pp. 890–1)
- Driver, S. R.; Wardrop, Margery; Lake, Kirsopp (2006). Studies in Biblical and Patristic Criticism: Or Studia Biblica Et Ecclesiastica. Gorgias Press LLC. ISBN 9781593334703.
- Gil, M.; Broido, Ethel (1997). A History of Palestine, 634-1099. Cambridge University Press. ISBN 9780521599849.
- Government of Jordan, Department of Statistics (1964). First Census of Population and Housing. Volume I: Final Tables; General Characteristics of the Population (PDF).
- Government of Palestine, Department of Statistics (1945). Village Statistics, April, 1945.
- Guérin, V. (1868). Description Géographique Historique et Archéologique de la Palestine (in French). Vol. 1: Judee, pt. 1. Paris: L'Imprimerie Nationale.
- Hadawi, S. (1970). Village Statistics of 1945: A Classification of Land and Area ownership in Palestine. Palestine Liberation Organization Research Centre.
- Hitti, P. (2002). History of Syria Including Lebanon and Palestine. Gorgias Press LLC. ISBN 1931956618.
- Hütteroth, W.-D.; Abdulfattah, K. (1977). Historical Geography of Palestine, Transjordan and Southern Syria in the Late 16th Century. Erlanger Geographische Arbeiten, Sonderband 5. Erlangen, Germany: Vorstand der Fränkischen Geographischen Gesellschaft. ISBN 3-920405-41-2.
- Le Strange, G. (1890). Palestine Under the Moslems: A Description of Syria and the Holy Land from AD. 650 to 1500. Committee of the Palestine Exploration Fund.
- Mills, E., ed. (1932). Census of Palestine 1931. Population of Villages, Towns and Administrative Areas. Jerusalem: Government of Palestine.
- Morris, B. (2008). 1948: A History of the Arab-Israeli War. Yale University Press. ISBN 978-0-300-12696-9.
- Levy, T.E. (1998). Archaeology of Society in the Holy Land. Continuum International Publishing Group. ISBN 9780826469960.
- Mayhew, C.; Adams, M. (2006). Publish It Not: The Middle East Cover Up. Signal Books. ISBN 1-904955-19-3.
- Negev, Avraham; Gibson, Shimon (2005). Archaeological Encyclopedia of the Holy Land. Continuum International Publishing Group. ISBN 9780826485717.
- Oren, M. (2002). Six Days of War. Oxford University Press. p. 307. ISBN 0-19-515174-7.
- Palmer, E.H. (1881). The Survey of Western Palestine: Arabic and English Name Lists Collected During the Survey by Lieutenants Conder and Kitchener, R. E. Transliterated and Explained by E.H. Palmer. Committee of the Palestine Exploration Fund.
- Pringle, D. (1993). The Churches of the Crusader Kingdom of Jerusalem: A-K (excluding Acre and Jerusalem). Cambridge University Press. ISBN 0-521-39036-2.
- Robinson, E.; Smith, E. (1841). Biblical Researches in Palestine, Mount Sinai and Arabia Petraea: A Journal of Travels in the year 1838. Vol. 2. Boston: Crocker & Brewster. (pp. 363-364)
- Robinson, E.; Smith, E. (1841). Biblical Researches in Palestine, Mount Sinai and Arabia Petraea: A Journal of Travels in the year 1838. Vol. 3. Boston: Crocker & Brewster. (p. 30)
- Robinson, E.; Smith, E. (1856). Later Biblical Researches in Palestine and adjacent regions: A Journal of Travels in the year 1852. London: John Murray.
- E. de Rozière, ed. (1849). Cartulaire de l'église du Saint Sépulchre de Jérusalem: publié d'après les manuscrits du Vatican (in Latin and French). Paris: Imprimerie nationale.
- Röhricht, R. (1893). (RRH) Regesta regni Hierosolymitani (MXCVII-MCCXCI) (in Latin). Berlin: Libraria Academica Wageriana.
- Schick, C. (1884). "Das altchristliche Taufhaus neben der Kirche in Amwas". Zeitschrift des Deutschen Palästina-Vereins. 7. Leipzig: 15–17.
- Segev, S. (1967). A Red Sheet: the Six Day War.
- Segev, T. (2007). 1967: Israel, the War, and the Year that Transformed the Middle East. Translated by Jessica Cohen. Macmillan. ISBN 978-0-8050-7057-6.
- Sharon, M. (1997). Corpus Inscriptionum Arabicarum Palaestinae, Vol. I, A. BRILL. ISBN 90-04-10833-5.
- Thiede, C.P.; D'Ancona, M. (2005). The Emmaus Mystery: Discovering Evidence for the Risen Christ. Continuum International Publishing Group. ISBN 9780826467973.
- Wareham, Norman; Gill, Jill (1998). Every Pilgrim's Guide to the Holy Land. SCM-Canterbury Press Ltd. ISBN 9781853112126.
