= Basilica of San Frediano =

Romanesque church in Lucca, Italy

Coordinates: 43°50′46″N 10°30′17″E

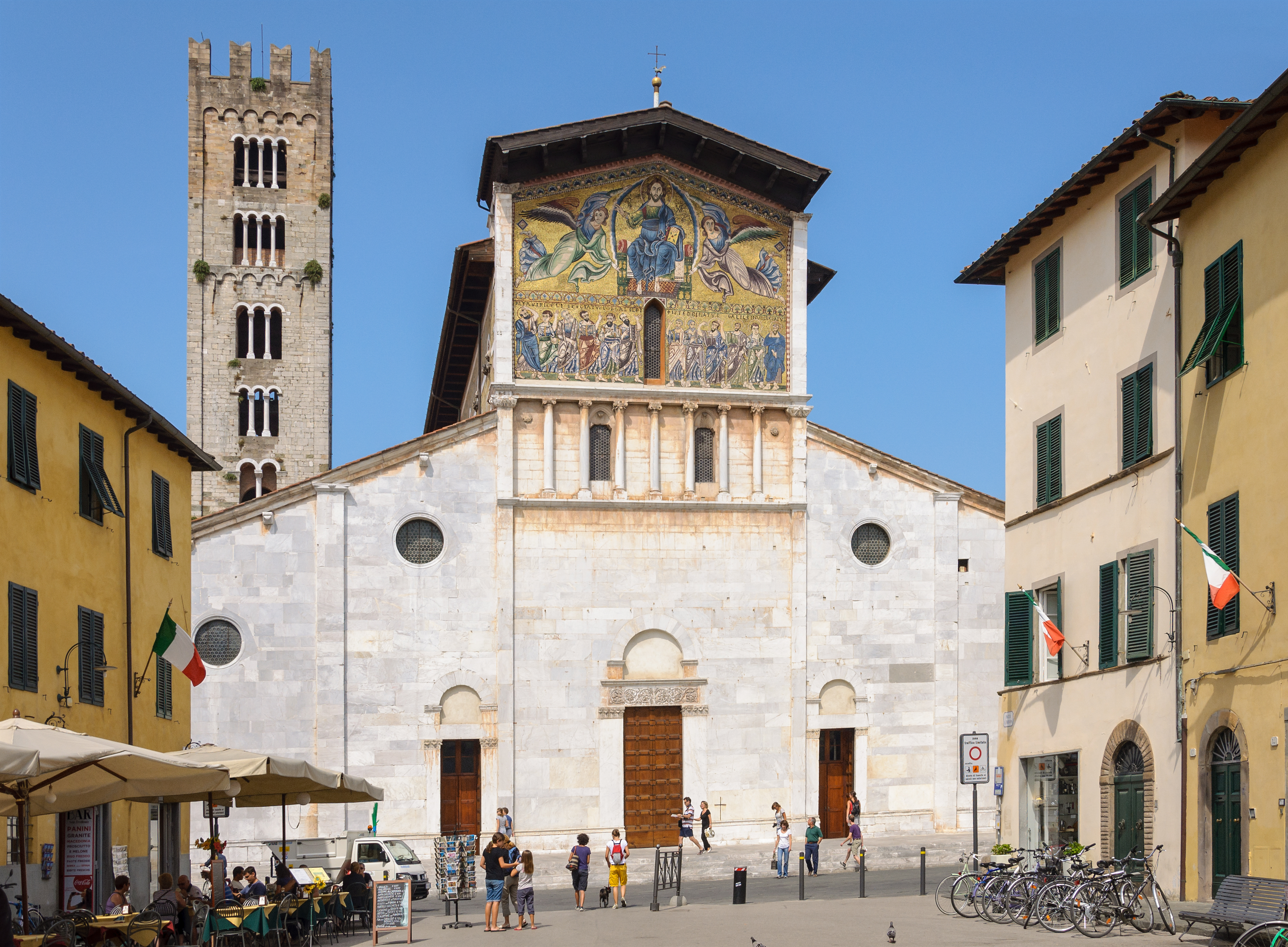
Basilica of San Frediano

The Basilica of San Frediano is a Romanesque church in Lucca, Italy, situated on the Piazza San Frediano.

== History ==
Fridianus (Frediano) was an Irish bishop of Lucca in the first half of the 6th century. He had a church built on this spot, dedicated to St. Vincent, a martyr from Zaragoza, Spain. When Fridianus was buried in this church, the church was renamed Ss. Frediano and Vincenzo. Soon afterwards, a community of Augustinian canons was growing around this church. In the Longobard era, the church and the canon house were enlarged. In 1104, this order was recognized by Pope Paschal II. The prior of St. Frediano was later accorded a rank equal in dignity to that of a bishop.

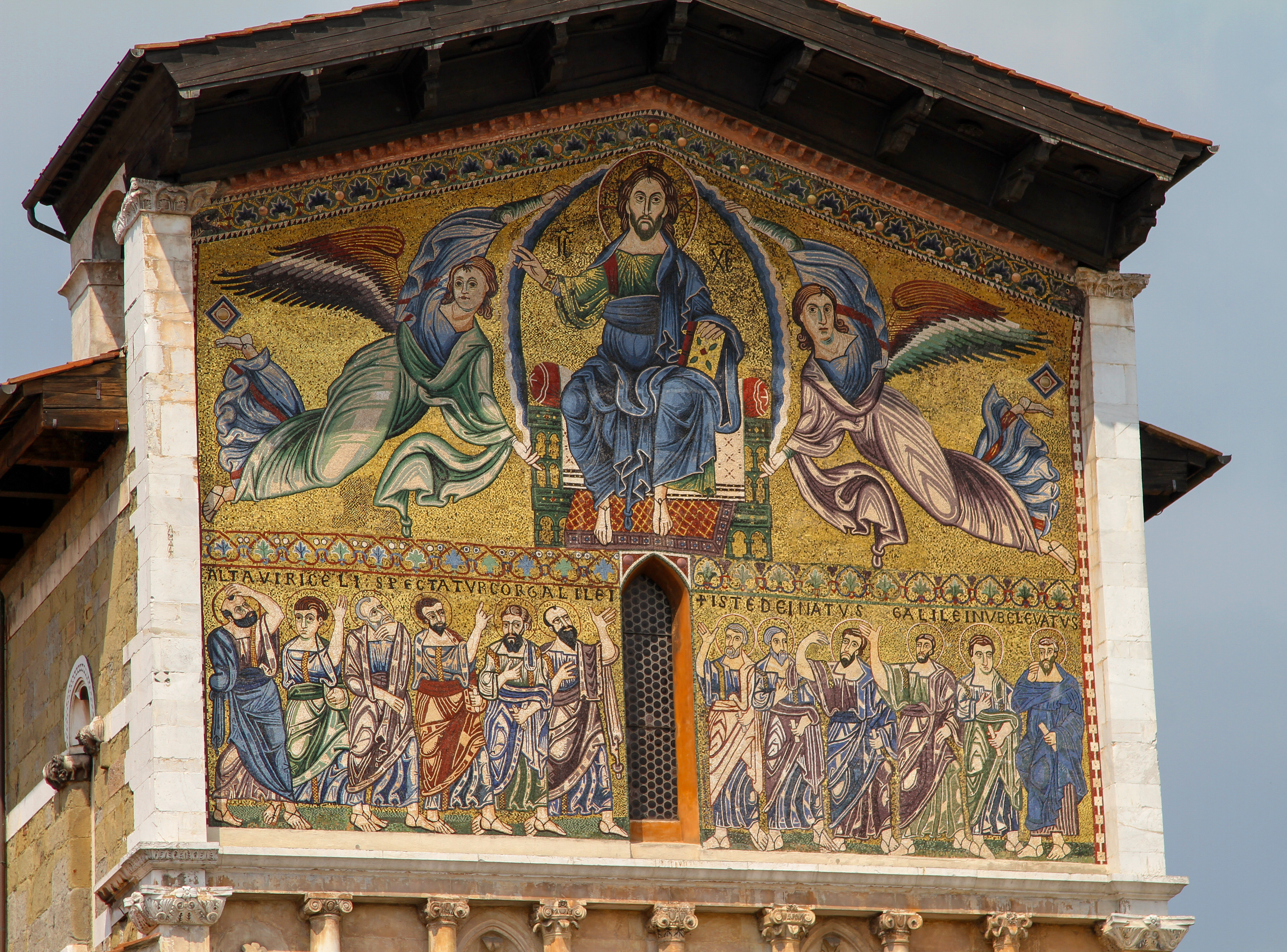
The Byzantinesque mosaic on the façade extension of the 13th century

The church acquired its present appearance of a typical Roman basilica during the period 1112–1147. In the 13th-14th centuries the striking façade was decorated with a huge golden mosaic representing The Ascension of Christ the Saviour with the twelve apostles below. Berlinghiero Berlinghieri designed it in a Byzantine/medieval style.

Several chapels of the nobility were added in the 14th-16th centuries. These are lavishly decorated with paintings.

== Comparisons ==
The architecture of the Basilica of San Frediano well represents the characteristics of Romanesque Lucca before the influences of the nearby Pisa, in particular of the Cathedral of Buscheto, and workers from northern Italy change its traditional character. The church still has a simple type of early Christian basilica plan, with curtain walls smooth, without projections or complex joints of the arches, and architectural elements are all of Roman tradition, such as architraves and columns of the façade and the apse, the windows niche, the specially carved composite capitals. These same features are found - in a stadium even purer - in the nearby church of St. Alexander, which includes the remains of an older building in which every element, from the paths proportional to the quality of the walls, the arrangement of unusual materials to bare corinzieggianti capitals, is all ancient Roman traditions.

== Description ==
Inside, the basilica is built in richly carved white marble. It consists of a nave and two aisles with arches supported by columns with Roman and Romanesque capitals. The Roman capitals were recycled from the nearby Roman amphitheatre.

The highlight at the entrance is the huge 12th-century Romanesque baptismal font (the Fonte Lustrale). It is composed of a bowl, covered with a tempietto, resting on pillars, inside a circular basin. It is the craftmanship of master Roberto (his signature is on the basin) and two unknown masters. The basin is decorated with The Story of Moses by a Lombard sculptor. Master Roberto did the last two panels The Good Shepherd and the Six Prophets. The tempietto was sculpted by a Tuscan master, representing the months of the year and the apostles.

Behind this font, higher on the wall, are two 15th century glazed terracotta lunettes: The Annunciation and St. Bartholomew, both attributed to the school of Andrea della Robbia.

There is another baptismal font, still in use, carved and adapted from a sacramental altar by Matteo Civitali in 1489.

The counterfaçade houses the 16th century organ in the exquisitely carved, gold-plated choir from the 17th century.

On the right hand is the side chapel of St. Zita (c. 1212–1272), a popular saint in Lucca. Her intact incorrupt body, lying on a bed of brocade, is on display in a glass shrine. On the walls of the chapel are several canvasses from the 16th and 17th centuries depicting episodes from her life.

The remains of St. Frediano lie underneath the main altar from the 16th century. A massive stone monolith stands left of the main altar. This was probably pilfered from the amphitheatre of Lucca. But local tradition has it that it was miraculously transported to Lucca by San Frediano and used as a predella (step of an altar) for the first altar.

== Chapels ==
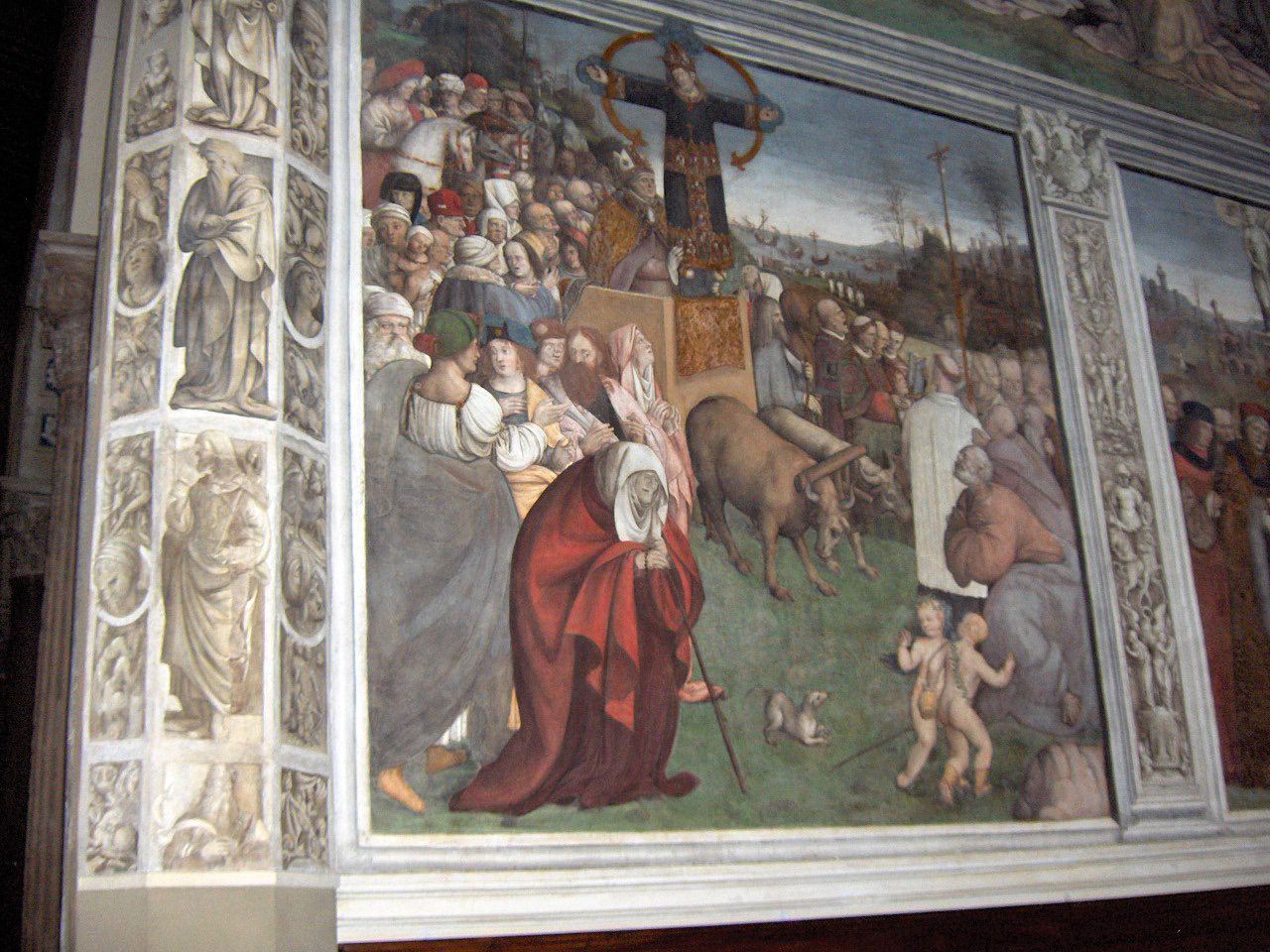
Transportation of the Volto Santo.

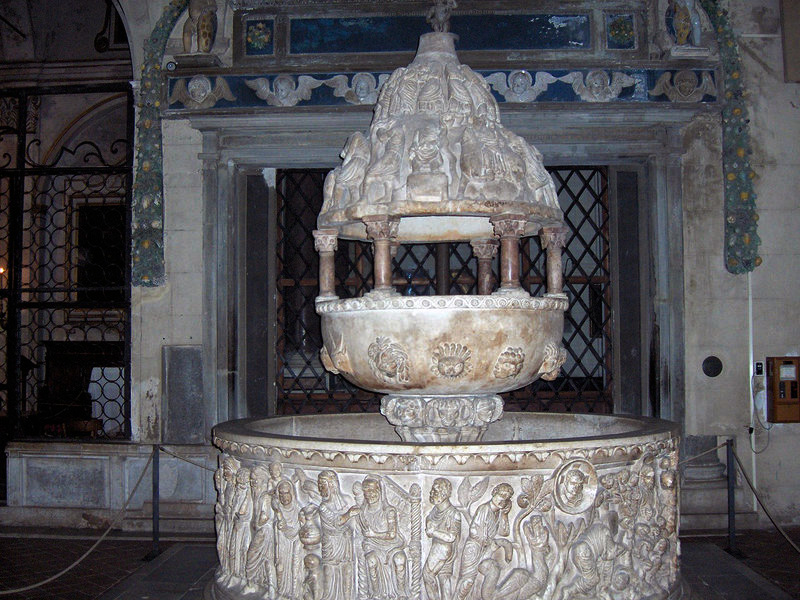
12th century baptismal font.

The Trenta chapel in the left aisle houses the polyptych of the Virgin and the Child, a 15th-century masterpiece by Jacopo della Quercia, carved with the help of his assistant Giovanni da Imola. Below the altar is a Roman sarcophagus with the body of St Richard the Pilgrim, an English “king” (of Wessex), who died in Lucca in 722 while on pilgrimage to Rome. He was the father of Saints Willibald, Winibald and Walpurga. On the marble floor lies a tombstone of Lorenzo Trenta and his wife, equally from the hand of Jacopo della Quercia.

Among the many chapels, the Chapel of the Cross certainly stands out. It contains frescoes, recently restored, by Amico Aspertini (1508–1509). The blue vault shows us God surrounded by angels, prophets and sibyls. Above the altar is an anonymous 17th-century painting representing Volto Santo, St. Augustine and St. Ubaldo. On the right wall is the fresco of St. Frediano displacing the course of the river Serchio, while trying to stop the flooding. Next to it is a column which is, at closer sight, actually flat. The sgraffiti are drawn in the art technique of trompe l’oeil, giving a false perspective and the illusion of a column. On the left wall is the fresco of the Transportation of the Volto Santo from the port of Luni to Lucca by the Blessed Giovanni, bishop of Lucca. In the front the stooping old lady in red robe certainly steals the show. The mortal remains of this bishop are preserved in this chapel.

The Chapel of St. Anne was constructed in the 16th century, but the paintings date from the 19th century. On the left side of the altar is the Death of St. Anna by B. Rocchi. In the middle, above the altar, St. Anna Adores the Child by Stefano Tofanelli. On the right side of the altar is the Birth of Mary by A. Cecchi.
