= Richard the Pilgrim =

Anglo-Saxon saint

Saint Richard the Pilgrim
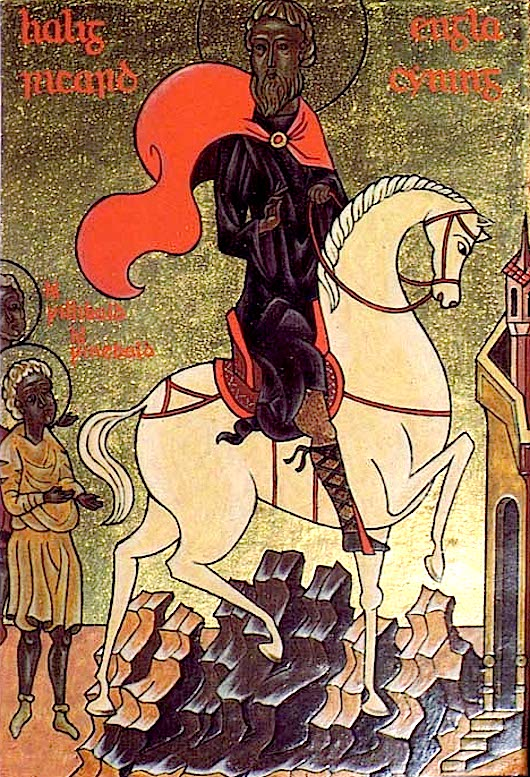
- Stained glass window in St Ricarius Church, Aberford
- Born: Wessex, Anglo-Saxon England
- Died: 720; Lucca, Italy
- Venerated in: Catholic Church; Eastern Orthodox Church
- Feast: February 7

Richard the Pilgrim or Richard of Wessex (died 720) was an English nobleman and Christian saint. He was the husband of Wuna of Wessex and the father of the West Saxon saints Willibald, Winnibald, and Walpurga. He led his family on a pilgrimage to the Holy Land but died en route in Lucca, where he was buried in the church of Saint Fridianus.

The name of the saints' father is not given in the 8th-century Hodoeporicon (Itinerary) of Hygeburg, the earliest source, nor is Richard listed in the earliest martyrologies. The name Richard and his identity as a "King of the English" are inventions of the 10th century from the monastery of Heidenheim. His relics were being publicly displayed in both Lucca and Eichstätt in the 12th century. His feast day is celebrated on February 7.

There is one church in England dedicated to him, St Ricarius Church, Aberford.

== Legend ==
The reigning king of the West Saxons in 720 was King Ine, who ascended the throne in 688 and died in or possibly after 726. Bede states that he abdicated after 37 years, i.e. 725–26. The Anglo-Saxon Chronicle refers to him abdicating in and around 726–28, then traveling to Rome and dying there.

Richard was from Wessex now part of England, and his real name is uncertain. He appears to have been an Anglo-Saxon chieftain or a Brittonic under-king in Wessex, probably of part of Brittonic Dumnonia. His wife was Wuna of Wessex, and they were the parents of Willibald, Bishop of Eichstätt, Winibald, Abbot of Heidenheim, and Walpurga, Abbess of Heidenheim. He obtained by his prayers the recovery of his three-year-old son Willibald, whom he laid at the foot of a great crucifix erected in a public place in Wessex when the child's life was despaired of in a grievous sickness.

In 720, he entrusted his eleven-year-old daughter Walpurga to the abbess of Wimborne in Dorset, renounced his estates, and set sail with his two sons from Hamblehaven near Southampton. They landed in France and temporarily stayed in Rouen. From there, they set off on the pilgrimage route to Italy, where they prayed at shrines situated along the way.

He died unexpectedly after developing a fever in Lucca, Tuscany, where he was buried in the Church of San Frediano, founded by the Irish monk Fridianus. Miracles were reported to have occurred at his tomb and a cult venerating him developed. The people of Lucca gave him the name "Richard" and embellished their accounts of his life, describing him as an English prince. Another apocryphal story described him as the Duke of Swabia in Germany.

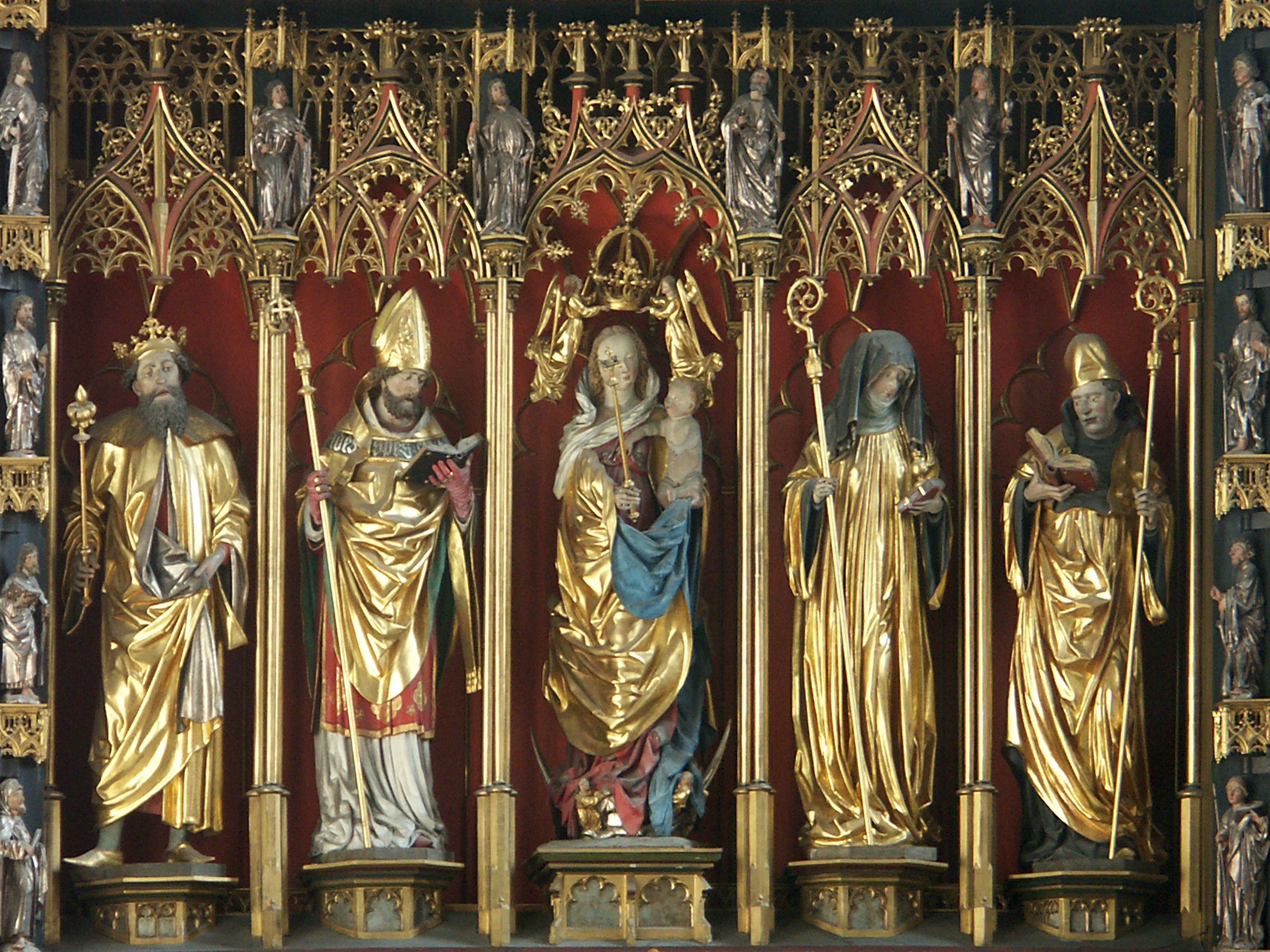
Eichstätt Mittelschrein

His son, Willibald, continued the pilgrimage to the Holy Land. Richard's niece, a nun called Hygeburg (Huneburc of Heidenheim), wrote an account of the pilgrimage, entitled "Hodoeporicon"; historians date the text between 761 and 786.

== Veneration ==
Some of Richard's relics were transported to Eichstätt, where Willibald eventually became Bishop. Richard's feast day is 7 February.

Richard is depicted with the Blessed Mother and his three children at Eichstätt Cathedral.

In religious artworks, Richard is portrayed as a royal pilgrim in an ermine-lined cloak with two sons, one a bishop and one an abbot. His crown appears to lie on a book (Roeder). Richard is particularly venerated at Heidenheim and Lucca (Roeder).

On the evening of February 6, 2022, Dormition of the Virgin Mary Greek Orthodox Church in Somerville, Massachusetts served a complete All-Night Vigil service for Richard using a newly-composed office text. Modern Byzantine chant composers, including Jessica Suchy-Pilalis, composed music for the idiomela. Iconographer Brian Matthew Whirledge painted a new icon of Richard for the Vigil's procession. The Dormition parish served the All-Night Vigil again on February 6, 2023.

== See also ==
- Saint Richard the Pilgrim, patron saint archive
