= Walpurga =

Walpurga or Walpurgis may refer to

- Saint Walpurga (8th century), an English missionary in Germany
- Walpurgis Night, a holiday celebrated in Central Europe and Northern Europe
- Royal Armouries Ms. I.33, a medieval manuscript on swordsmanship which is also called "Walpugis MS"
- La Noche de Walpurgis, a Spanish horror movie
- 256 Walpurga, Main Belt asteroid
- Maria Antonia Walpurgis of Bavaria (1724–1780), princess of Bavaria
- Walpurga von Isacescu (born 1870), Austrian swimmer

== In music and literature ==
- Duchess Maria Antonia of Bavaria (1724–1780), musician
- Die erste Walpurgisnacht (First Walpurgis Night), a cantata for choir and orchestra by Felix Mendelssohn
- Repent Walpurgis by Procol Harum
- Walpurgis Night, a 1984 album by German heavy metal band Stormwitch
- "War Pigs", a song by Black Sabbath originally called "Walpurgis"
- "Walpurgisnacht", a song by German pagan folk / medieval band Faun
- Walpurgis (album), a 2021 album by Japanese singer Aimer
- "Knights of Walpurgis", The original name of the Death Eaters led by Lord Voldemort in the Harry Potter series
