= Adelbert of Heidenheim =

12th-century German abbot and chronicler

Adelbert of Heidenheim was the abbot of the Benedictine monastery in Heidenheim, active in the 12th century. He wrote a biography of Winibald, titled Chronicon S. Wunnibaldi, also known as the Relatio from the title given to the earliest printed edition by Jakob Gretser (d. 1625), alongside a brief report on the history of the monastery that was published sometime between 1155 and 1160.
