= Hygeburg =

Anglo-Saxon nun and hagiographer

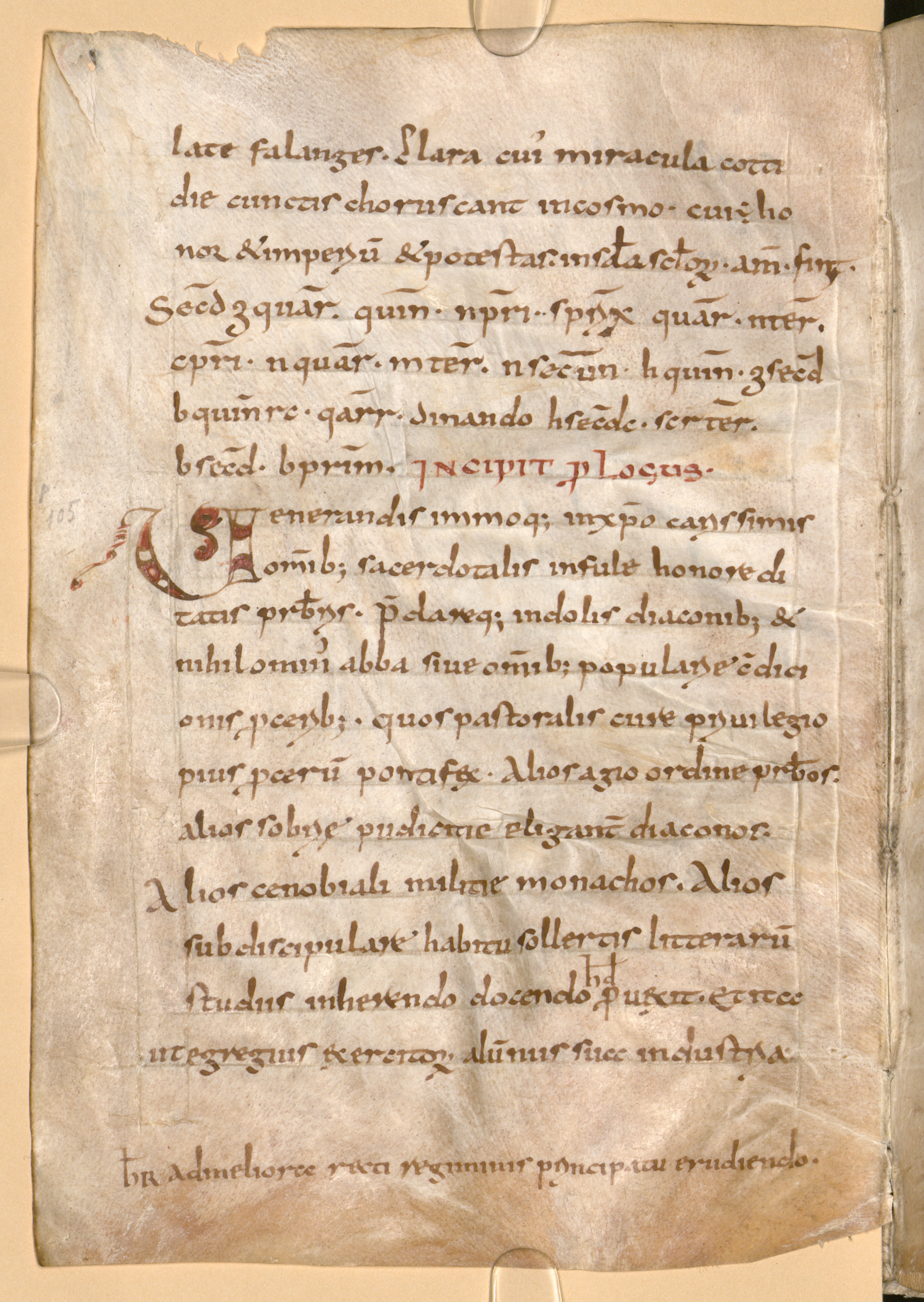
Munich, Bayerische Staatsbibliothek, MS Clm 1086, folio 71v, includes the cipher with Hygeburg's name.

Hygeburg (fl. 760–780), also Hugeburc, Hugeberc, Huneberc or Huneburc, was an Anglo-Saxon nun and hagiographer at the Alemannian monastery of Heidenheim. She is "the first known Englishwoman to have written a full-length literary work" and "the only woman author of a saint's life from the Carolingian period".

Heidenheim was founded as a monastery for monks in 752 by Wynnebald, an Anglo-Saxon from Wessex. On his death in 761, his sister Walburg inherited it and converted it into a double monastery with the introduction of nuns. Hygeburg was among those who came to Heidenheim immediately after Wynnebald's death. Probably she had already been in Germany for some time, one of the nuns summoned by Boniface.

Hygeburg was, in her own words, "a humble relative" of Wynnebald, Walburg and their brother, Willibald. On Tuesday, 23 June 778, while he was visiting Heidenheim, Willibald dictated to Hygeburg an account of his pilgrimage to the Holy Land in the 720s or 730s. She subsequently worked this account into a biography of Willibald, called the Hodoeporicon ("relation of a voyage"). (The conventional name Vita Willibaldi, "Life of Willibald", was given to it by editors.) From her choice of phrase and motif, she must have had access to the Carmen paschale, the Vita Bonifatii and the riddles of Aldhelm.

Although there was opposition to her writing within the convent, Walburg encouraged it. Hygeburg also wrote a biography of Wynnebald, the Vita Wynnebaldi. Although her two works were a single project, completed by 780, they are textually distinct, indicating her use of oral reports and eyewitness testimony. She was herself a witness to some of the post-mortem miracles she attributes to Wynnebald's intervention.

The name of the nun who wrote the lives of Willibald and Wynnebald was not known until in 1931 Bernhard Bischoff discovered it in a cryptogram in the oldest manuscript (from c. 800).
