= 256 Walpurga =

Main belt asteroid

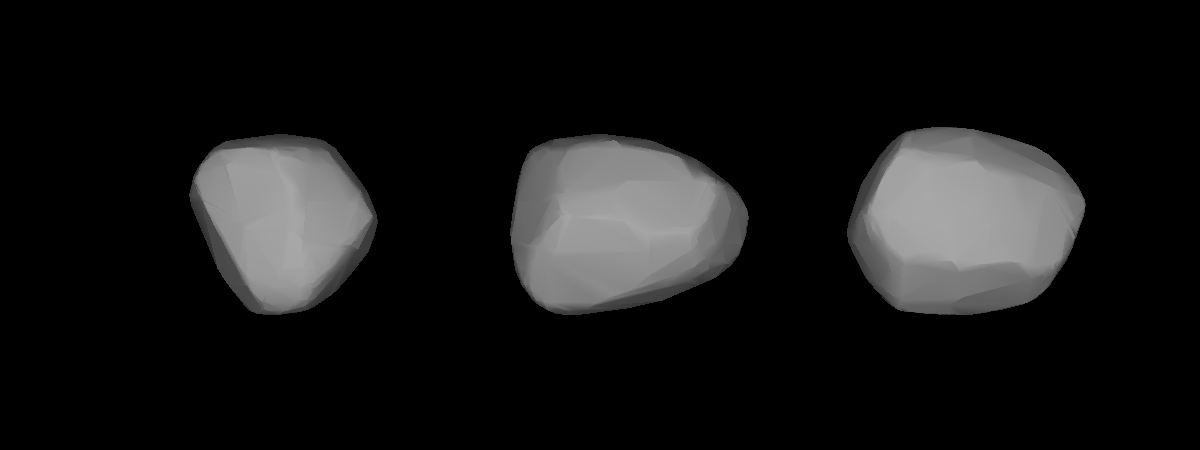
- Lightcurve-based 3D model of 256 Walpurga

Discovery
- Discovered by: Johann Palisa
- Discovery date: 3 April 1886

Designations
- Pronunciation: /vælˈpɜːrɡə/
- Named after: Saint Walpurga
- Alternative designations: A886 GA, 1951 VJ
- Minor planet category: Main belt

Orbital characteristics
- Epoch 31 July 2016 (JD 2457600.5)
- Uncertainty parameter 0
- Observation arc: 130.04 yr (47496 d)
- Aphelion: 3.19960 AU (478.653 Gm)
- Perihelion: 2.79984 AU (418.850 Gm)
- Semi-major axis: 2.99972 AU (448.752 Gm)
- Eccentricity: 0.066634
- Orbital period (sidereal): 5.20 yr (1897.7 d)
- Mean anomaly: 352.098°
- Mean motion: 0° 11^{m} 22.945^{s} / day
- Inclination: 13.3281°
- Longitude of ascending node: 182.937°
- Argument of perihelion: 46.5713°

Physical characteristics
- Dimensions: 63.34±2.7 km
- Synodic rotation period: 16.664 h (0.6943 d); 16.64 h
- Geometric albedo: 0.0530±0.005
- Absolute magnitude (H): 9.9

256 Walpurga is a large Main belt asteroid. It was discovered by Johann Palisa on 3 April 1886 in Vienna and was named after Saint Walburga.

Photometric observations at the Oakley Observatory in Terre Haute, Indiana, during 2007 were used to build a light curve for this asteroid. The asteroid displayed a rotation period of 16.64 ± 0.02 hours and a brightness variation of 0.38 ± 0.02 in magnitude.
