= Winibald =

Incorrupt saint

Saint Winibald OSB
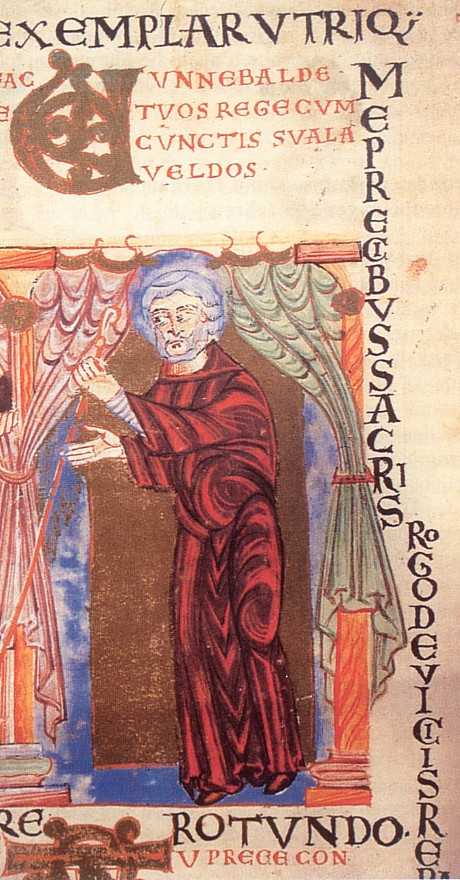
- Wunibald, as depicted in Pontifikale Gundekarianum, 11th century
- Died: 18 December 761
- Venerated in: Roman Catholic Church; Eastern Orthodox Church
- Feast: 18 December
- Attributes: portrayed as an abbot with a bricklayer's trowel; shown with Willibald (his brother) and Richard the Saxon (his father)

Winibald (Winebald, Winnibald, Wunebald, Wynbald) (c. 702 - 18 December 761) was abbot of the Benedictine double monastery of Heidenheim am Hahnenkamm. Traditionally, he is called the brother of Willibald and Walpurga.

== Life ==
Winibald's father was a West Saxon nobleman, Richard the Pilgrim and his mother was Wuna of Wessex. Willibald was his brother. With his father and brother he made a pilgrimage to Rome around the year 721. His father died in Italy. In Rome, they fell ill, possibly with malaria, although Hygeburg says it was the Black Plague. Once recovered, Willibord continued to the Holy Land, while Winebald, who from his childhood did not have a strong constitution, remained at Rome, to recover and study. In 730, Winibald returned to England and engaged a third brother and several amongst his kindred and acquaintance to accompany him in his journey back to Rome to begin a monastic life there.

Around 737, Boniface visited Rome. By this time Willibald had returned from his travels, and had become a monk at Monte Cassino. Boniface recruited both nephews for the German mission. Willibald was ordained and based in Eichstätt. Boniface received a promise that Winnebald would go to Germany. Winibald arrived in Thuringia on 30 November, 740, and was ordained priest. He was placed in charge of seven churches, including one at Erfurt.

Winibald established a monastery in Schwanfeld, but in 742 transferred it to Heidenheim, where the brothers founded a double monastery for the training of priests and as a center of learning. Winibald became the first abbot.

Winibald took part in the Concilium Germanicum, in 742, and subscribed Pepin's donation to Fulda in 753. In 762, he joined the League of Attigny, a confraternity of prayer established by Chrodegang, Archbishop of Metz. All this the saint accomplished in spite of continual illness, which prevented him from ending his life at Monte Cassino as he had hoped. Winibald died at Heidenheim on December 18, 761.

== Veneration ==
Winebald's feast day is December 18. In art, he is portrayed as an abbot with a bricklayer's trowel. He is a patron saint of construction workers. Adelbert of Heidenheim wrote a biography of him in the 12th century.
