= Wuna of Wessex =

7th-century Christian saint

Saint Wuna of Wessex
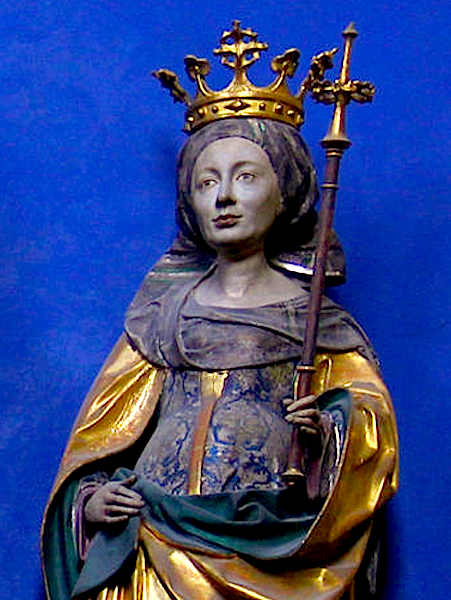
- Statue of St. Wuna of Wessex at the Convent of St. Walburg, Eichstätt
- Born: 7th century
- Died: 710 C.E.
- Venerated in: Catholic Church
- Feast: February 7

Wuna of Wessex (also known as Wunna, Winna, Wina, and Bonna) was a 7th and 8th-century Anglo-Saxon noblewoman and Christian saint. The name Wuna means "The Joyful One". Her actual name is unknown, but she has been called Wuna since the Middle Ages.

== History ==
According to Christian tradition, Wuna was the wife of Richard the Pilgrim and the mother of Willibald, Walpurga, and Winibald. She was from a noble family in Wessex. Some scholars have argued that she was a sister of Boniface.

She died around the year 710; and is venerated in the Catholic Church with a feast day on 7 February.
