= Willibald =

8th-century bishop and saint

Saint Willibald OSB
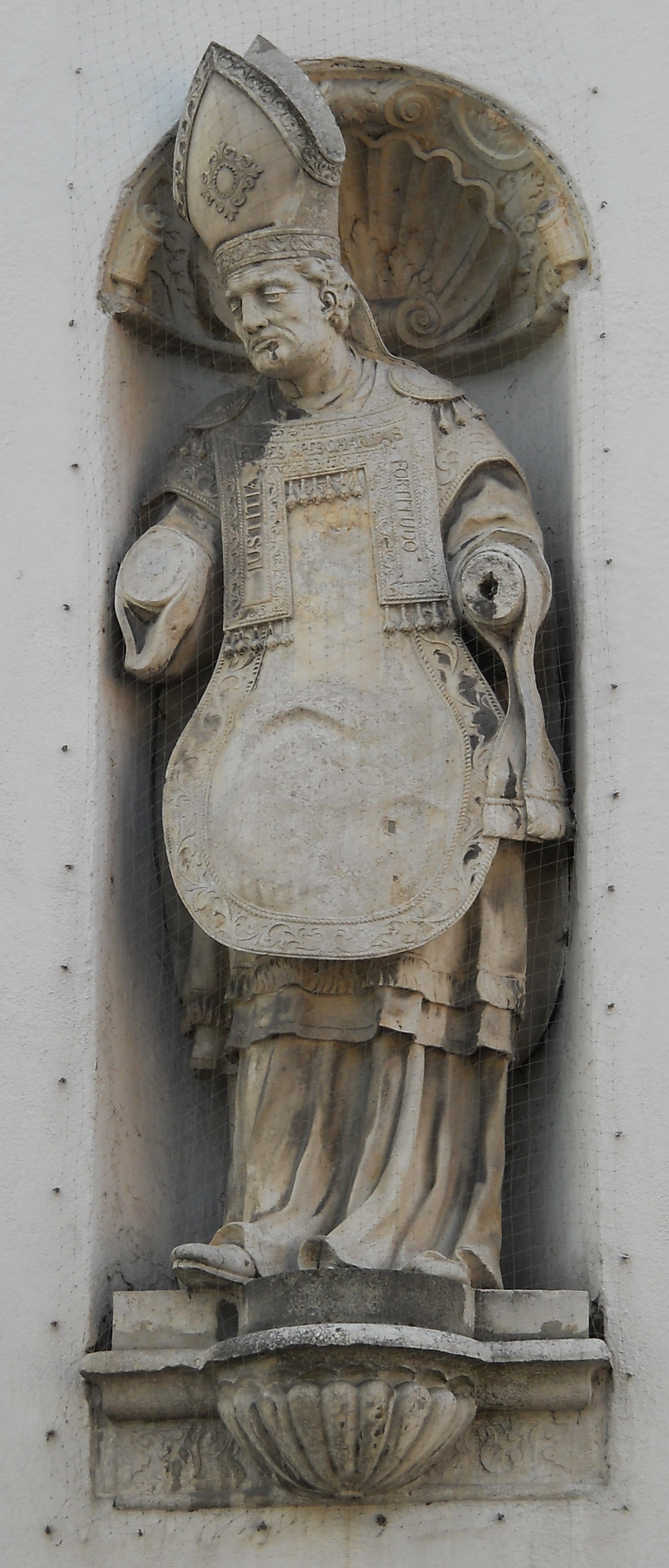
- Statue of Saint Willibald in Eichstätt, by Christian Handschuher

Bishop
- Born: ~700 AD; Wessex
- Died: ~787 AD; Eichstätt, Duchy of Bavaria, East Francia
- Venerated in: Roman Catholic Church; Eastern Orthodox Church
- Canonized: 938 AD by Pope Leo VII
- Major shrine: Eichstätt Cathedral
- Feast: 7 July
- Patronage: Eichstätt

Willibald (Latin: Willibaldus; c. 700 – c.787) was an 8th-century bishop of Eichstätt in Bavaria.

Information about his life is largely drawn from the Hodoeporicon of Willibald, a text written in the 8th century by Huneberc, an Anglo-Saxon nun from Heidenheim am Hahnenkamm who knew Willibald and his brother personally. The text of the Hodoeporicon ("Itinerary") was dictated to Huneberc by Willibald shortly before he died.

Willibald's father was Richard the Pilgrim, and his mother Wuna of Wessex. His brother was Winibald and his sister was Walburga.

Willibald was well-travelled and the first known Englishman to visit the Holy Land. His shrine is at the Eichstätt Cathedral in Germany, where his body and relics from his journeys are preserved.

His feast day is 7 July.

== Early life ==
Willibald was born in Wessex on 21 October around the year 700. His mother, Wuna of Wessex, was reportedly a sister of Boniface. His father, Richard the Pilgrim, was a chieftain of Wessex. At the age of three, Willibald suffered from a violent illness. His parents prayed to God, vowing to commit Willibald to a monastic life if he was to be spared. Willibald survived and at the age of five entered the Benedictine monastery at Waldheim and was educated by Abbot Egwald. At the monastery he became accustomed to the Irish and Anglo-Saxon monastic ideal of peregrinatio religiosa, or pious rootlessness.

== Travels ==
In 721 Willibald set out on a pilgrimage to Rome with his father and brother. After departing by ship the group arrived in Rouen, France visiting shrines and spending much of their time in prayer. Eventually they arrived in Lucca, a city in northern Italy. It was here that Willibald's father became gravely ill and died. After burying their father Willibald and Winibald continued on their journey, travelling through Italy until they reached Rome. Here they visited the Lateran Basilica and St. Peter's. They spent some time in Italy, strengthening in devotion and discipline, but soon the two brothers became ill with the Black Plague (although Mershman says it was malaria).

Hunebrec recounts the disease and miraculous recovery:

Then with the passing of the days and the increasing heat of the summer, which is usually a sign of future fever, they were struck down with sickness. They found it difficult to breathe, fever set in, and at one moment they were shivering with cold the next burning with heat. They had caught the black plague. So great a hold had it got on them that, scarcely able to move, worn out with fever and almost at the point of death, the breath of life had practically left their bodies. But God in His never failing providence and fatherly love deigned to listen to their prayers and come to their aid, so that each of them rested in turn for one week whilst they attended to each other's needs.

Willibald left Rome in 724, heading for Naples. From there, accompanied by two unnamed companions and brother, he departed by sea, visited Sicily and Greece along the way, and eventually arrived in Asia Minor. Winnebald had, after the departure of his brother for Palestine, lived in a monastery at Rome.

=== Greece, Asia Minor, Cyprus and Syria ===
In Asia Minor Willibald and his companions first arrived in the city of Ephesus. Here they visited the tomb of John the Evangelist. They then continued on to Patara in Lycia, where they waited out the winter, and then travelled to Mount Chelidonium, almost dying of hunger and thirst as they attempted to cross. They departed by boat and arrived on the island of Cyprus. Following a stay in Cyprus they reached Antadoros (now called Tartus) where they had an audience with a Greek bishop and visited the church of Saint John the Baptist.

=== Holy Land ===
Willibald's journey then took him and a group of seven companions to Palestine (c. 723/24 - 726/27). There he visited Nazareth. From Nazareth he went to Bethlehem, and thence into Egypt. He returned to Nazareth, and thence travelled to Cana, Capharnaum, and Jerusalem, where he arrived on 11 November 725. The pilgrimage continued to Bethlehem and the Church of the Nativity, Thecua, the Great Lavra of St Sabbas, the church at the spot where Philip the Evangelist baptised the Ethiopian eunuch, the port city of Gaza, Hebron, Saint George's hometown of Lydda, Joppa, Tyre and Sidon, Sebaste and other places in Samaria, Ptolemais, and again reached Tyre by way of the Ladder of Tyre.

=== Return voyage ===
After waiting for some time in Tyre, Willibald was able to sail to Constantinople. He remained in Constantinople for some two years (c. 726/27–729) and was provided with a small room in an annex of the Church of the Holy Apostles. He spent part of this time in Nicaea, visiting a church and studying documents from the First Council of Nicaea that was arranged by Emperor Constantine. He left Constantinople and sailed for Sicily arriving in Naples approximately seven years after he had left Italy.

== Monte Cassino ==
Willibald and his remaining companion, Tidbercht, joined the Benedictine community at Monte Cassino. Here Willibald taught the community about his travels. He would spend over ten years (c. 729–739) at Monte Cassino and another local Benedictine monastery where he served roles as, "sacrist, dean, and porter." According to David Farmer, his new-found monasticism was drastically shaped by his experiences in both England and Palestine, allowing him to play a major role in the reformation and future prosperity of the monastery.

It happened that in 738 Boniface, coming to Rome, asked of Pope Gregory III that Willibald might be sent to assist him in his missions in Germany. The pope desired to see the monk, and was much delighted with the history of his travels, and acquainted him of Boniface's request.

== Eichstätt, ordination, and missionary work ==
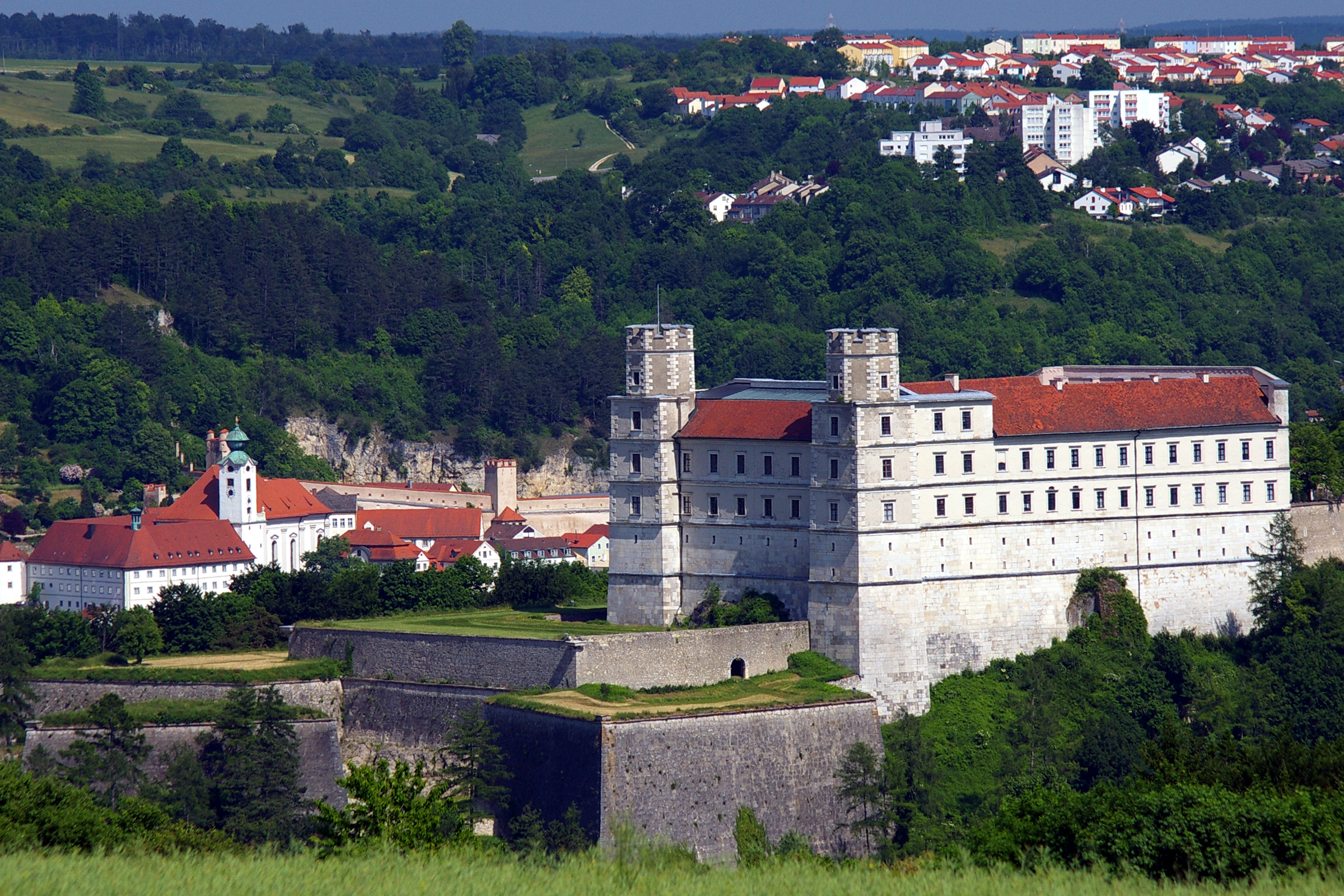
The Willibaldsburg above Eichstätt

Upon arriving at Eichstätt, he was ordained a priest by Boniface on 22 July 741 and asked to begin missionary work in the area. A year later, Boniface summoned him to Thuringia. While travelling, Willibald encountered his brother, Winibald, whom he had not seen for over eight years.

Shortly thereafter he returned to Eichstätt to begin his work. In 742 he and Winibald founded the double monastery of Heidenheim. Winibald served as the first abbot. Following his death, Willibald's sister, Walburga, was appointed the first abbess of the monastery. In 746 Boniface consecrated Willibald bishop of Eichstätt.

According to Bunson, Eichstätt was the site of Willibald's most successful missionary efforts, although specific details like the means of conversion and number of converts are not known. The monastery was one of the first buildings in the region and served as an important centre, "not only for the diocesan apostolate, but also for the diffusion and development of monasticism." Wilibald served as the bishop of the region in Franconia for over four decades, living in the monastery and entertaining visitors throughout Europe who would come to hear of his journey and monasticism.

== Bibliography ==
- Seeing Islam As Others Saw It: A Survey and Evaluation of Christian, Jewish and Zoroastrian Writings on Early Islam (Studies in Late Antiquity and Early Islam) Robert G. Hoyland
- The Anglo-Saxon Missionaries in Germany: Being the Lives of S.S. Willibrord, Boniface, Strum, Leoba and Lebuin, together with the Hodoeporicon of St. Willibald and a Selection from the Correspondence of St. Boniface (Also Includes the first biography of St. Boniface.) C. H. Talbot, London and New York: Sheed and Ward, 1954
- Medieval Sourcebook: Huneberc of Heidenheim: The Hodoeporican of St. Willibald, 8th century. Copied from the above-quoted book by C. H. Talbot
- Willibald von Eichstätt in the German Wikipedia
- Abbey of Saint Walburga
