= Saint Walpurga =

Anglo-Saxon missionary (c. 710 – 777/779)

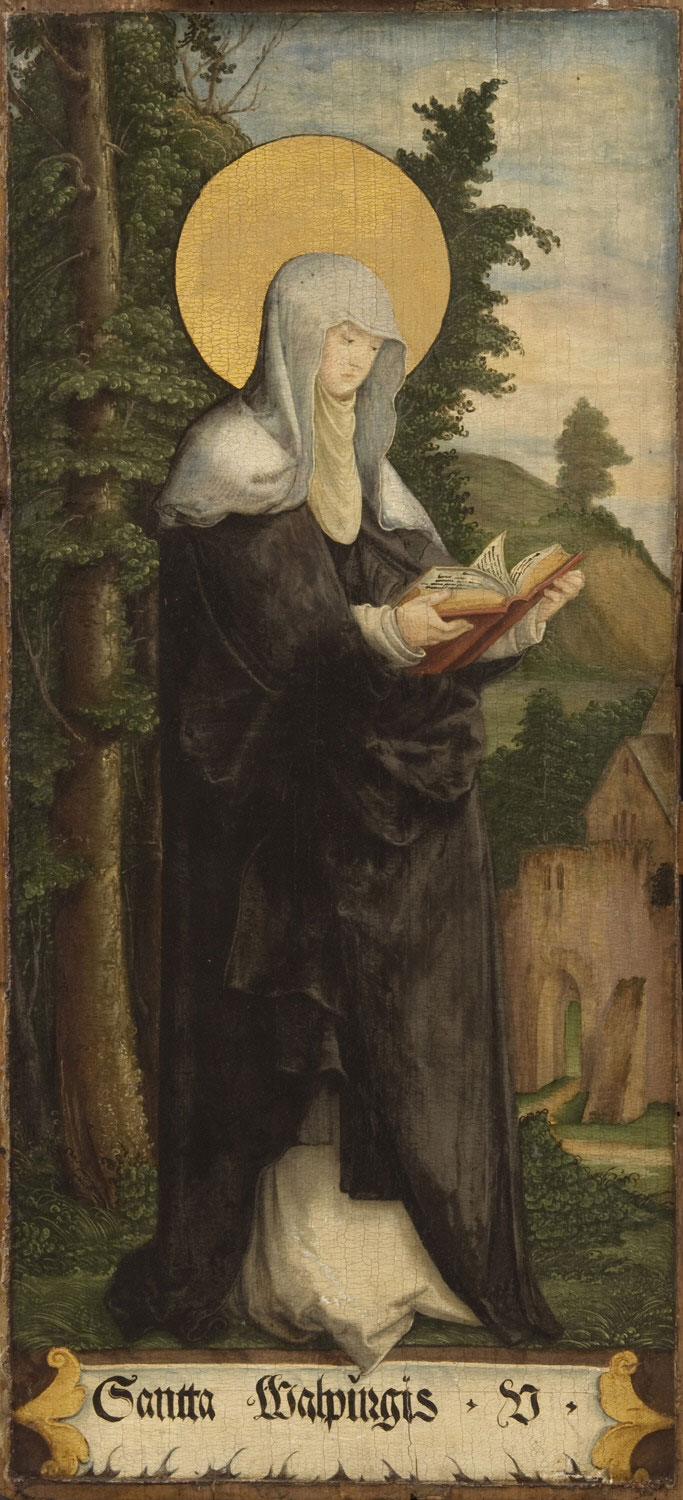
- Painting by the Master of Meßkirch, c. 1535–40.
- Born: c. 710; Crediton, Devonshire, Wessex
- Died: 25 February 777 or 779; Heidenheim, Francia
- Venerated in: Catholic Church; Lutheran Churches; Eastern Orthodox Church; Anglican Communion
- Canonized: 870 by Pope Adrian II
- Feast: 25 February; 1 May (relocation of her relics)
- Patronage: Eichstätt, Antwerp, Zutphen and other towns

Walpurga or Walburga (Note: Also spelled Valderburg or Guibor. Other spellings: Valborg (the Swedish name for her), Walburge, Valpuri, Auboué, Avangour, Avongourg, Falbourg, Gaubourg, Gualbourg, Valburg, Valpurge, Vaubouer, Vaubourg, Walbourg, Walpurd, Warpurg. She is also known by the seemingly unrelated names Perche and Eucharis.) (Old English: Wealdburg; Latin: Valpurga, Walpurga, Walpurgis; Swedish: Valborg; c. 710 – 25 February 777 or 779) was an Anglo-Saxon missionary to the Frankish Empire. She was canonized on 1 May c. 870 by Pope Adrian II. Saint Walpurgis Night (or "Sankt Walpurgisnacht") is the name for the eve of her feast day in the Medieval period, which coincided with May Day; her feast is no longer celebrated on that day (even though the celebration of Valborg, is on the last of April) but the name is still used for May Eve.

== Early life ==
Walpurga was born in Dumnonia, roughly corresponding to modern Devon, during the period it was becoming incorporated into Anglo-Saxon England. She was the daughter of Richard the Pilgrim, a likely Britonnic underking of the West Saxons, and of Wuna of Wessex, and had two brothers, Willibald and Winibald.

== Religious career ==
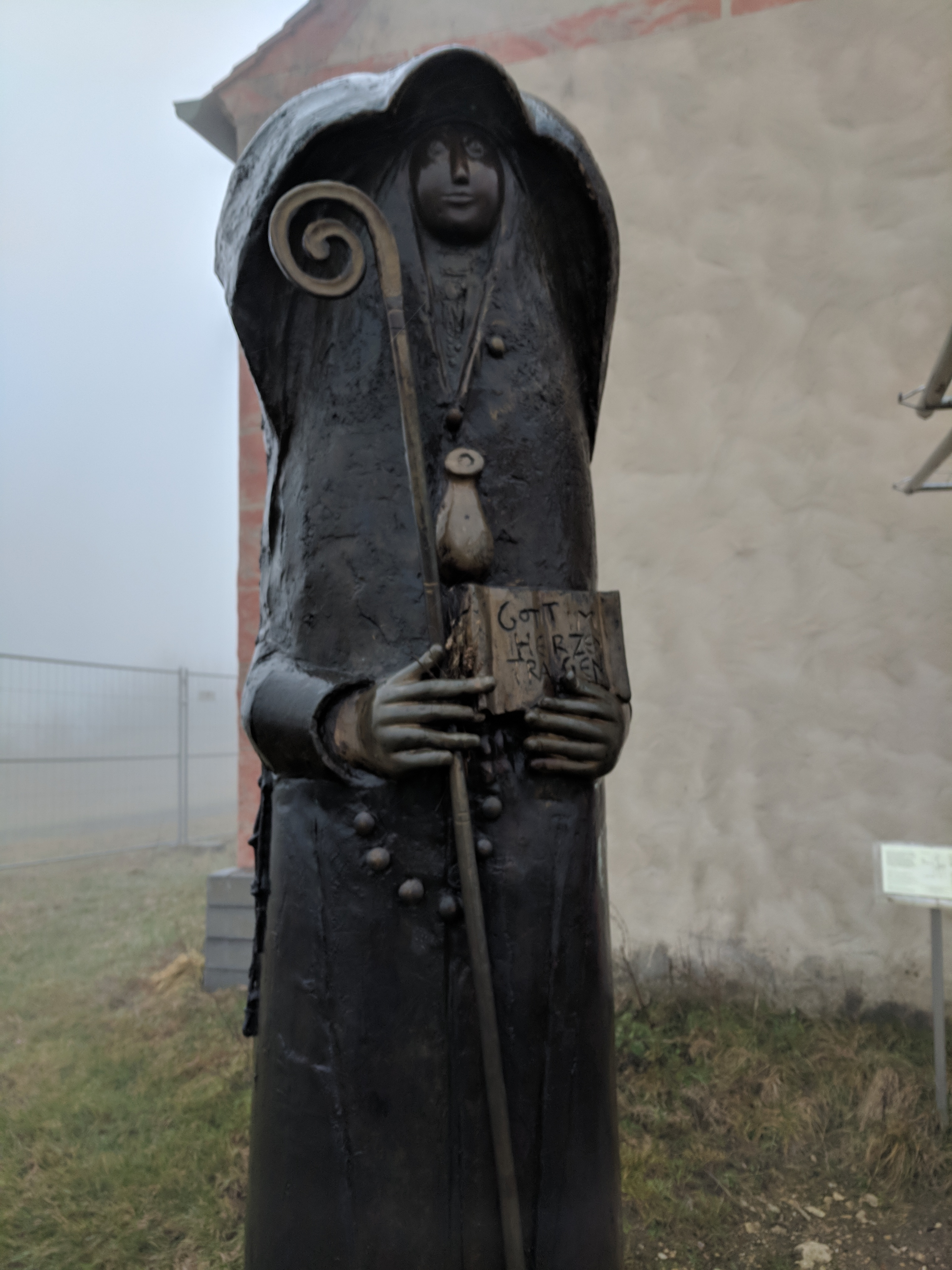
Statue of Walburgis at Walburgis Kapelle at Kirchehrenbach, Germany

In 721, Richard set out on a pilgrimage to Rome with his two sons. Before leaving he entrusted Walburga, then 11 years old, to the abbess of the double monastery at Wimborne Abbey in Dorset. She had been there but a year when she received word that her father had died at Lucca. After seeing to their father's burial in the Basilica of San Frediano, her brothers completed the pilgrimage to Rome, where they both became seriously ill. (Hygeburg, who wrote the Vita S. Willibaldi, says they contracted the Black Death; Francis Mershman suggests malaria).

After recovering, Winibald, who was not of a particularly strong constitution, remained in Rome to pursue further studies, while Willibald set out for the Holy Land. After about seven years of travelling, Willibald returned to Italy and became a monk at Monte Cassino. In 730, Winibald returned to England and engaged a third brother and several amongst his kindred and acquaintances to accompany him on his journey back to Rome to begin a monastic life there.

During this time Walpurga remained at Wimborne where she was educated, and eventually became a nun. The nuns of Wimborne were skilled at copying and ornamenting manuscripts; and celebrated for Opus Anglicanum, a fine needlework utilising gold and silver threads on rich velvet or linen, often decorated with jewels and pearls. Such English embroidery was in great demand across Europe. She spent 26 years as a member of the community.

In 737, Walpurga's uncle (her mother's brother), Boniface, was in Rome and recruited his nephews to assist him in his religious work in Germany. Winibald arrived in Thuringia on 30 November 740, and after being ordained a priest, was placed in charge of seven churches. Willibald, upon arriving at Eichstätt, was ordained by Boniface on 22 July 741 and began missionary work in the area.

Walpurga then travelled with her brothers, Willibald and Winibald, to Francia (now Württemberg and Franconia) to assist Boniface in evangelizing the still-pagan Germans. Some sources claimed that she wrote her brother Willibald's vita and an account in Latin of his travels in Palestine, though these were later determined to have been written by Hugeburc of Heidenheim.

Walpurga became a nun in the double monastery of Heidenheim am Hahnenkamm, which was founded by Willibald. He appointed her as his successor and following his death in 751, Walpurga became the abbess of the monastery. Upon Winibald's death in 760 she also succeeded him as superintendent of the Heidenheim monastery.

== Death ==
Walpurga died on 25 February 777 or 779 (the records are unclear) and was buried at Heidenheim; the day carries her name in the Catholic church calendar. In 870, Walpurga's remains were translated to Eichstätt. In Finland, Sweden, and Bavaria, her feast day commemorates the transfer of her relics on 1 May.

== Veneration ==
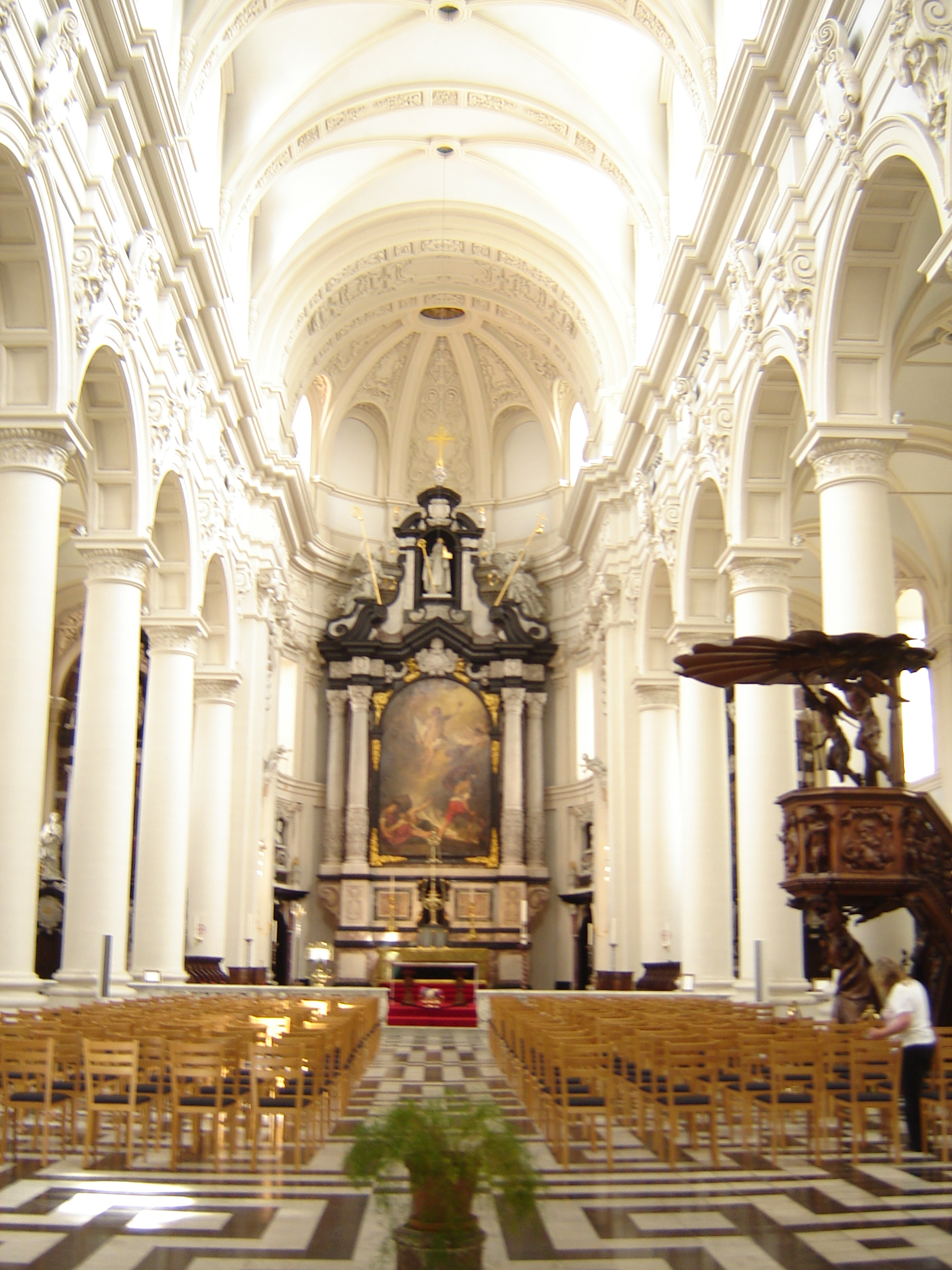
The St. Walburga Church in Bruges was originally a Jesuit church

Walpurga's feast day is 25 February, but the day of her canonization, 1 May (possibly 870), was also celebrated during the high medieval period, especially in the 11th century under Anno II, Archbishop of Cologne, so that Walpurgis Night is the eve of May Day, celebrated in continental folklore with dancing.

At Eichstätt, her bones were placed in a rocky niche, which allegedly began to exude a miraculously therapeutic oil, which drew pilgrims to her shrine. The bituminous oil, called Walpurgis oil, was said to exude from her bones (especially from October through February) and was regarded as being efficacious against disease.

The two earliest miracle narratives of Walpurga are the Miracula S. Walburgae Manheimensis by Wolfhard von Herrieden, datable to 895 or 896, and the late 10th-century Vita secunda linked with the name of Aselbod, bishop of Utrecht. In the 14th-century Vita S. Walburgae by Phillipp von Rathsamhaüsen, bishop of Eichstätt (1306–22), the miracle of the tempest-tossed boat is introduced, which Peter Paul Rubens painted in 1610 for the altarpiece for the church of St. Walpurgis, Antwerp. (Note: The altarpiece is now disassembled.) In addition, the 19th-century Cardinal Newman declared the exuded oil to be a credible miracle.

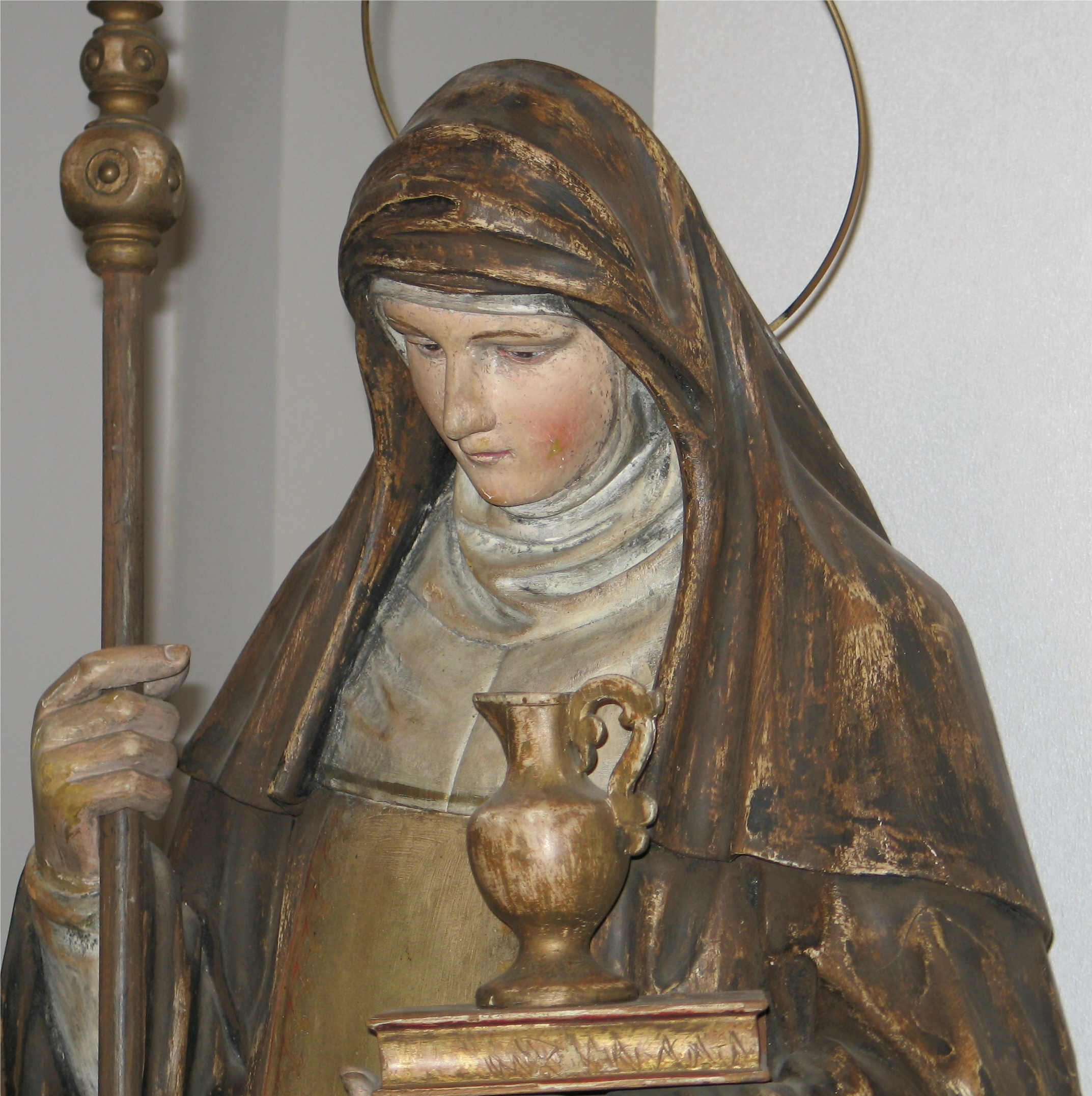
Statue in Contern church.

The earliest representation of Walpurga is in the early 11th-century Hitda Codex, made in Cologne, and depicts her holding stylized stalks of grain. In other depictions, the object has been called a palm branch which is not correct, since Walpurga was not martyred. The grain attribute has been interpreted as an instance of a Christian saint (Walpurga) coming to represent an older pagan concept; in this case, the pagan Grain Mother. Peasant farmers fashioned her replica in a corn dolly at harvest time and told tales to explain Saint Walpurga's presence in the grain sheaf.

== Patronage ==
Walpurga is the patroness of Eichstätt and Weilburg, Germany; Oudenarde, Veurne, Antwerp, Belgium; Tiel (demolished), Groningen (demolished), Arnhem, Amby and Zutphen the Netherlands; and she is invoked as special patroness against hydrophobia (rabies), in storms, and also by sailors.

== Legacy ==
St. Walburga's Abbey is located at Eichstätt, Bavaria. A second Benedictine Abbey of St. Walburga is located in Virginia Dale, Colorado, near the Wyoming border. The abbey in Colorado is home to approximately 20 contemplative Catholic nuns and also has a retreat center. St. Walburg Monastery in Covington, Kentucky, is a community of Benedictine sisters who arrived in Northern Kentucky in 1859. Their early teaching efforts later resulted in the establishment and development of Villa Madonna Academy and Thomas More University.

The Church of St. Walburge, a Catholic church in Preston, Lancashire, England, is a church famous for its spire. At 309 feet (94 m), the spire is the tallest of any parish church in England, with only the spires of Salisbury and Norwich Cathedrals reaching higher.

The St. Walburg's Hospital, a 220-bed hospital in southern Tanzania was built in 1959.

== St. Walburga Church in Antwerp (Belgium) ==
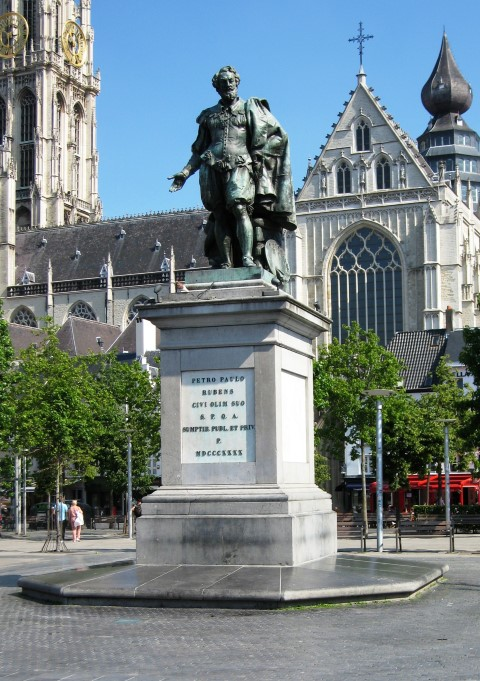
Rubens, Groenplaats

Central in the first fortified city of Antwerp, from the 11th century, was the church dedicated to Saint Walburga. Under French occupation in 1798, the church was confiscated and sold; it served as a warehouse. In 1816, the Dutch government confiscated the church building, and in 1817, it was demolished. The city mayor and aldermen decided to erect a statue of Pieter Paul Rubens on the burg square left after the demolition. In 1880, when the Scheldt quais were built, most of the area of the first fortified city from the 11th century was demolished and even the foundations of the St. Walburga Church disappeared, and the statue was moved to the Groenplaats.

Some parts of the interior of that ancient church, which actively served for more than 700 years, were recovered: the altarpiece painting The Elevation of the Cross and the predella (foot of the altar) have been reused in the main altar of the Cathedral of Our Lady. Another altar was moved to the Heikese kerk in Tilburg where it serves as the main altar.

In 1936, the city master builder (architect) Flor Van Reeth constructed a new modernistic church building with the same name on the Volkstraat near Het Zuid. This building was declared a monument in 1995 and was restored in 2007.

== See also ==
- Germanic Christianity
- Walpurgis
