= Double monastery =

Monastery combining separate communities of monks and nuns

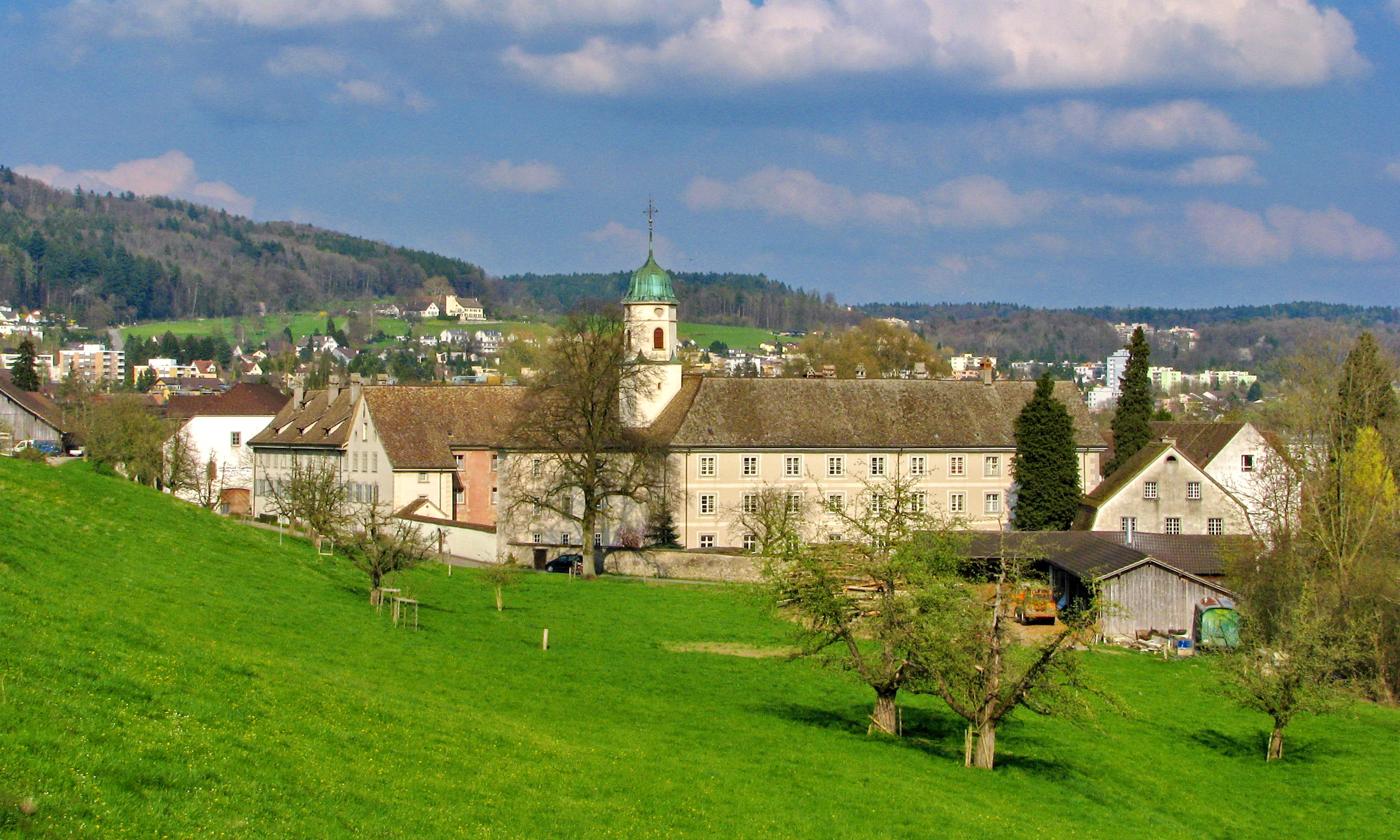
Fahr Convent in Switzerland, still part of a double monastery with Einsiedeln Abbey, though not sharing a site.

A double monastery (also dual monastery or double house) is a monastery combining separate communities of monks and of nuns, joined in one institution to share one church and other facilities. (Note: Less frequently, the term is used to describe one monastery based on two sites like the Monkwearmouth-Jarrow Priory.) The practice is believed to have started in the East at the dawn of monasticism. It is considered more common in the monasticism of Eastern Christianity, where it is traceable to the 4th century. In the West the establishment of double monasteries became popular after Columbanus and sprang up in Gaul and in Anglo-Saxon England. Double monasteries were forbidden by the Second Council of Nicaea in 787, though it took many years for the decree to be enforced. Double monasteries were revived again after the 12th century in a significantly different way when a number of religious houses were established on this pattern among Benedictines and possibly the Dominicans. The 14th-century Bridgittines were purposely founded using this form of community.

In the Catholic Church, monks and nuns would live in separate buildings but were usually united under an abbess as head of the entire household. Examples include the original Coldingham Priory in Scotland, Barking Abbey in London, and also Einsiedeln Abbey and Fahr Convent in separate cantons of Switzerland, controlled by the abbot of Einsiedeln without a converse arrangement for the prioress of Fahr. More commonly, however, a woman ruled over the two communities.

== Origins ==
The double monasteries of the 7th and 8th centuries had their roots in early Christian religious communities. Early female monasticism, while not as well-documented as that of its male counterpart, is known by the fifth century in the case of a convent founded in Marseille in 410 by John Cassian. This preceded several convents in Rome. Basil and Pachomius both established female religious communities in close proximity to those of men in the East. In 512, Bishop Caesarius of Arles founded the convent of St. John the Baptist for his sister and her religious community of women. It is this latter convent, and the Rule with which Caesarius endowed it, that served as the framework for the evolution of the double monastery.

Caesarius laid down that individual convents were to be governed by women. The abbess or prioress was to be "superior in rank" and "obeyed without murmuring". Caesarius ensured that the abbesses of the convents would be free of forced obedience to the local diocesan bishop by obtaining a Papal letter exempting the convent from episcopal authority. He also wrote the Regula sanctarum virginum, the first known rule specifically created for a convent. This rule featured a combination of old and new restrictions on monastic life, including the individual renunciation of private property, obedience to God through the abbess, and chastity for life, which served the dual purpose of protecting the enclosure of the convent's members and limiting intrusion by the secular world.

== Rise ==
By the 7th century, the Irish missionary Columbanus had established the most famous convent in Gaul, Luxeuil Abbey. Following the death of her husband Clovis II in 657, Balthild, the Queen Regent of Neustria and Burgundy became patron of the community, thereby promoting the example of Luxeuil's mixed rule — a combination of Benedictine and Columbanian monasticism — throughout medieval Europe. Balthild was responsible for the foundation of an abbey of nuns at Chelles around 659, a double monastery, where she retired following her vacating of the regency of the Merovingian throne. Around this same time, the brother of the bishop Audoens, Ado, formed the famous double monastery of Jouarre, also in Gaul. These two monasteries shared many of the same features: they both housed male and female religious communities within the same enclosure, though these groups lived apart, and they shared a common church for liturgical offices. Both monasteries were administered by a single head, typically an abbess, a reflection of Caesarius of Arles’ view about the management of female houses. While these religious houses were influenced by Columbanus’ missions in Gaul, he himself never established female religious institutions. The degree of influence which Irish monasticism might have had in the foundation of these Frankish double houses is unclear. In the 5th century, the monastery of St. Brigit of Kildare was a community of men and women living together without strict separation, but there is little evidence as to whether it was traditional or an anomaly.

The involvement of Columbanus’ successors as abbots of Luxeuil, Eustace and Waldebert, is well-documented. The Rule of a Father for Virgins, attributed to Waldebert, established the mother role of the abbess on terms very similar to those of an abbot. In this Rule, Walbert asserts that abbesses share many of the powers of an abbot, including the ability to hear confessions from their nuns and absolve them of their sins. These abbesses were often of noble birth, either direct or distant descendants of the family that founded the monastery. Between the start of the 6th century and the mid-8th century, when double monasteries went into decline, over one hundred double monasteries or convents had been founded in Gaul.

The double monasteries of Anglo-Saxon England were heavily influenced by the monastic system of Gaul. Hilda of Whitby, abbess of the most famous double house in England, had originally intended to join her sister at Chelles in 647, where many other daughters of the English nobility were educated. Instead, she remained in England, where Bishop Aidan of Lindisfarne trained her in monasticism. She continued the Gaulish tradition of noble female heads of double monasteries at Whitby Abbey, which she directly modelled drawing both upon Aidan’s teaching and the Rule followed by her contemporaries at Chelles and Jouarre. By order of King Oswiu, in 664 Hilda hosted the Synod of Whitby, which brought together representatives from the Celtic and Roman churches to resolve ecclesiastical differences between them, including the Easter Controversy. Whitby became known as a school for bishops, and produced five during Hilda’s time as abbess, according to Bede's Historia. The prominent position occupied in England by double monasteries emerges further from the fact that Whitby served in the seventh century as a place of retirement and burial for several Anglo-Saxon kings. It also fostered significant cultural achievements, such as the poems of Cædmon.

Beyond Whitby, Anglo-Saxon England cultivated double monasteries including Ely, which was founded by Queen Etheldreda of Northumbria. After spending twelve years refusing to consummate her marriage, Etheldreda was granted the land for Ely by her husband, King Ecgfrith of Northumbria. Another renowned double house, Barking Abbey, followed the Gallic tradition of separation of the sexes with one exception: after death, under Hildelith, abbess of Barking, both male and female burials were combined into a single mass grave. Anglo-Saxon missionaries to the Continent founded double houses there, one example is the double monastery of Heidenheim, Bavaria, founded by Willibald around 742, and later led by his sister, Walpurga.

A characteristic unique to Anglo-Saxon religious establishments was the simultaneous institution of double monasteries along with double minsters. Although both institutions housed both sexes, a double minster served as a church, often founded by a royal or a magnate, with an attached community of priests, nuns, and monks, rather than an enclosed religious community, to carry out welfare and pastoral work in the local area. This distinction was exemplified in the dichotomy between sanctimoniala, a professed nun, and a canonica- a woman living under a religious rule, but without necessarily having taken personal religious vows, as in the case of Beguines and Beghards.

Double monasteries were not exclusively found in the West, however. During the 8th century, some cases of double monasteries were documented in the Byzantine Empire. These monasteries were not physically enclosed communities, and featured separate churches for nuns and monks. The most notable of these establishments is the monastery of Mantineion, founded by Anthusa of Constantinople during the reign of the patriarch Nicephorus. Mantineon featured a school for boys in the male monastery, and unlike its Gallic and Anglo-Saxon counterparts, the male and female sections of the monastery featured very different lifestyles. They did, however, rely upon each other, and established a centre of activity between the two churches that allowed both monks and nuns to exchange skills and goods. Like Western double monasteries, the establishment of medieval Byzantine double houses peaked by the mid-eighth century.

== Decline and revival ==
By the end of the 8th century, the double monastery as an institution entered a steep decline. The most obvious doctrinal explanation for this shift lies in the twentieth canon of the seventh ecumenical synod declared at the Second Council of Nicaea in 787. This canon reads, in part:

“Double monasteries are henceforth forbidden. If a whole family wishes to renounce the world together, the men must go into convents for men, the female members of the family in convents for women. The double monasteries already existing may continue … but must observe the following ordinance: Monks and nuns may not reside in one building, for living together gives occasion for incontinence. No monk may enter the nun’s quarter, and no nun converse apart with a monk."

By banning further establishment of double monasteries and limiting their applicant pool, the Second Council of Nicaea effectively ensured that double monasteries throughout both England and Gaul would not exist within a century. This ecclesiastical ordinance was not the only limit on the expansion of the double house system. In England, the effects of constant Viking raids combined with the general decline of a cloistered life during the early 9th century all led to a sharp decrease in the populations and activities of these double houses. The Danish invasions of the 9th century led to the destruction of the double monasteries of Whitby, Barking, and Ely by 870. Often, former double monasteries were eventually converted into all-female convents.

Beginning in the late 10th century, Anglo-Saxon England experienced a revival of monasticism. Alfred the Great and his queen, Ealhswith, both established convents, though by the time of the Norman Conquest there remained only a few convents and no double monasteries in England. In this new wave, the Regularis Concordia was compiled, which was a form of standardized monastic rule. This rule contained explicit instructions regarding the separation of the sexes, forbidding men to enter convents or disturb a nun at prayer. By the twelfth century, double monasteries experienced a faint resurgence, especially in England under Gilbert of Sempringham’s rule. He established a total of thirteenth mixed houses by the end of that century. These new monasteries were not without controversy, however. On canonical grounds, Pope Alexander threatened Gilbert with excommunication for promoting a banned form of religious community, and only the intervention of King Henry and prominent English bishops allowed Gilbert to continue his double monasteries. There were also allegedly more mundane causes of scandal, such as pregnant nuns.

Double monasteries continued in Frankish society, but both sections, male and female, eventually shifted into more separate communities of canons and canonesses. In Sweden, on the other hand, double monasteries experienced a great revival during the late fourteenth century with the spread of the Order of the Holy Saviour, also known as the Bridgettines after their founder, Birgitta of Sweden. While double monasteries never again reached the heights of influence and ubiquity they had achieved during the mid-seventh century, the later Middle Ages saw a re-emergence and evolution of double houses and a spread across Europe.

A more recent Eastern Orthodox example emerged in England at Tolleshunt Knights in Essex where the Patriarchal Stavropegic Monastery of St. John the Baptist was established in 1959.

The Maronite Church developed the custom in the fifteenth century when men and women of the same family shared the same church, kitchen and sometimes dining area, but not the same residences. The custom of mixed monasteries was a contentious point during the Lebanese Council of 1736. While the reformers thought to separate monks and nuns, the traditionalists sought to maintain this custom. Though the custom was prohibited by the council of the monastery of Luwayza in 1818, it was not completely discarded until the time of patriarch Yusuf Hubaysh.

== Bibliography ==
- Dierkens, Alain (1989). "Prolégomènes à une historie des relationes culturelles entre les Îles Britanniques et le continent pendant le haut moyen âge". In Atsma, H. (ed.). La Neustrie. Les Pays au Nord de la Loire de 650 à 850. Vol. II. Sigmaringen. pp. 371–94.
- Gerchow, Jan (2008). "Early Monasteries and Foundations (500-1200)". In Jeffrey F. Hamburger (ed.). Crown and Veil: Female Monasticism from the Fifth to the Fifteenth Centuries. Susan Marti. New York: Columbia UP. pp. 13–40. ISBN 978-0-231-13980-9.
- Gilchrist, Roberta. Gender and Material Culture: The Archaeology of Religious Women. London: Routledge, 1994.
- Hefele, Charles Joseph. A History of the Christian Councils, from the Original Documents to the Close of the Council of Nicæa. Translated from the German and Edited by William R. Clark. Edinburgh: T. & T. Clark, 1894.
- Hefele, Charles Joseph. A History of the Councils of the Church. London: T & T Clark, 1896.
- Hollis, Stephanie. Anglo-Saxon Women and the Church: Sharing A Common Fate. Rochester: Boydell, 1992.
- Proksch, Nikola (1997). "The Anglo-Saxon Missionaries on the Continent". Monks of England: The Benedictines in England from Augustine to the Present Day. Society for Promoting Christian Knowledge. pp. 37–54.
- Ranft, Patricia. Women and Spiritual Equality in Christian Tradition. New York: St. Martin's, 1998.
- Lawrence, C.H. Medieval Monasticism. London: Longman, 1984.
- Parisse, M. "Doppelkloster". Lexikon des Mittelalters. Vol. III. Metzler. pp. 1258–59. ISBN 3-476-01742-7.
- Ruggieri, S.J. Byzantine Religious Architecture (582-867): Its History and Structural Elements. Rome: Pont. Institutum Studiorum Orientalium, 1991.
- Röckelein, Hedwig (2008). "Founders, Donors, and Saints: Patrons of Nuns' Convents". In Jeffrey F. Hamburger (ed.). Crown and Veil: Female Monasticism from the Fifth to the Fifteenth Centuries. Susan Marti. New York: Columbia UP. pp. 207–24. ISBN 978-0-231-13980-9.
