= Heidenheim, Bavaria =

Heidenheim
- Municipality
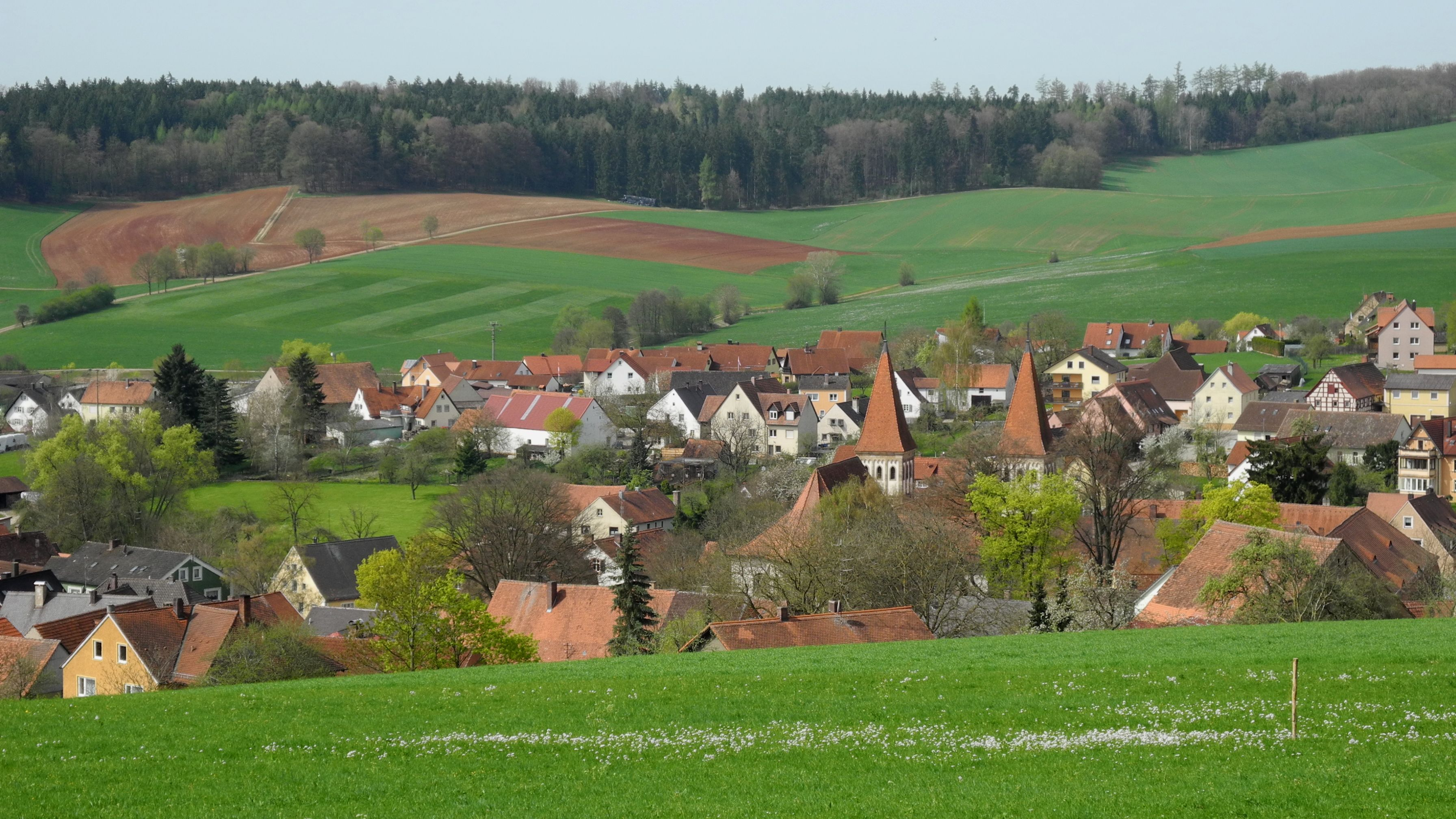

- Coat of arms

- Location of Heidenheim within Weißenburg-Gunzenhausen district
- Interactive map of Heidenheim
- Location within Germany Location within Bavaria
- Coordinates: 49°1′N 10°45′E
- Country: Germany
- State: Bavaria
- Admin. region: Mittelfranken
- District: Weißenburg-Gunzenhausen
- Municipal assoc.: Hahnenkamm
- Subdivisions: 4 Ortsteile

Government
  - Mayor (2020–26): Susanne Feller

Area
  - Total: 52.26 km^{2} (20.18 sq mi)
- Elevation: 529 m (1,736 ft)

Population (2025-12-31)
  - Total: 2,464
  - Density: 47.15/km^{2} (122.1/sq mi)
- Time zone: UTC+01:00 (CET)
  - Summer (DST): UTC+02:00 (CEST)
- Postal codes: 91719
- Dialling codes: 09833
- Vehicle registration: WUG
- Website: Markt Heidenheim am Hahnenkamm

Heidenheim (German pronunciation: [ˈhaɪdn̩ˌhaɪm]) is a market town in central-western Bavaria, in southern Germany. It is sometimes known as Heidenheim am Hahnenkamm to avoid confusion with nearby Heidenheim an der Brenz in Baden-Württemberg.

== Geography ==
Heidenheim is located in the administrative district of Middle Franconia. It belongs to the Weißenburg-Gunzenhausen district and is the seat of the Hahnenkamm municipal association. Heidenheim includes the local subdistricts of Degersheim, Hechlingen am See, and Hohentrüdingen.

== History ==
Heidenheim was first mentioned in the year 742. During that time, the double monastery of Heidenheim am Hahnenkamm (housing monks and nuns) was founded by Saint Willibald and was later led by Saint Walpurga, who became abbess after his death. Secular power was represented in turn by the Count of Truhendingen (Altentrühdingen), the Duke of Bavaria, and the Hohenzollern burgrave of Nuremberg. Thereafter, the town belonged to the Principality of Ansbach. The monastery was closed in 1537 due to the Reformation. Since then, Heidenheim has been mostly Lutheran. In 1792, Prussia bought the Principality of Ansbach, bringing Heidenheim under Prussian rule. As part of Ansbach, Heidenheim was transferred back to Bavaria due to the Treaty of Paris (1806).

== See also ==
- Heidenheim Abbey, a former Benedictine foundation
