= Church of St Thomas of Canterbury and the English Martyrs, Preston =

Coordinates: 53.7692°N 2.7043°W

English Martyrs Church
- Church of St Thomas of Canterbury and the English Martyrs, Preston
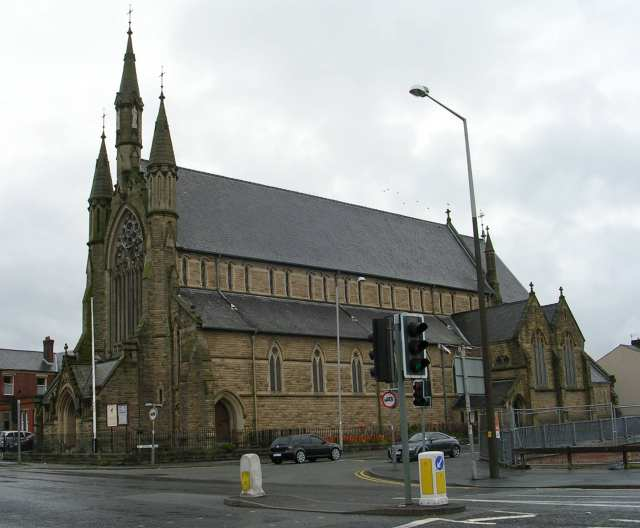

- Location within Preston
- OS grid reference: SD 53677 30545
- Location: Preston, Lancashire
- Country: England
- Denomination: Roman Catholic
- Website: StJohnXXIIIPreston.com

History
- Status: Shrine church
- Founded: January 22, 1865
- Founder: Bishop Alexander Goss
- Dedication: St Thomas Becket and the English Martyrs
- Dedicated: 1 December 1867
- Consecrated: 14 September 1921

Architecture
- Functional status: Active
- Heritage designation: Grade II
- Designated: 2 September 1985
- Architect: Edward Welby Pugin
- Style: Gothic Revival
- Groundbreaking: 26 May 1866
- Completed: 9 February 1888; 138 years ago

Specifications
- Capacity: 850
- Length: 154 ft (47 m)
- Width: 92 ft (28 m)
- Height: 69 ft (21 m)

Administration
- Province: Liverpool
- Diocese: Lancaster
- Deanery: Preston
- Parish: St John XXIII

English Martyrs Church or its full name The Church of St Thomas of Canterbury and the English Martyrs is a Roman Catholic Parish church in Preston, Lancashire. It was designed by Edward Welby Pugin and is a shrine church of the Diocese of Lancaster within the Parish of St John XXIII, Preston. It is near to Preston city centre and stands on the corner of the A6, between Aqueduct Street and St George's Road.

== History ==
=== Gallow's Hill ===
English Martyrs Church is built on the site of an area that used to be called Gallows Hill. It received that name after the Battle of Preston of the Jacobite rising of 1715. After the government overcame the rebel army, it was on Gallows Hill that the rebel prisoners were executed. On 5 January 1715, it was recorded that sixteen rebels 'were hanged upon Gallows Hill, for high treason and conspiracy.'

In May 1817, evidence of this was found when the area was dug up to improve the road heading north (the A6 road), and two coffins were found containing the remains of two headless bodies. A brass hand axe was also unearthed, with portions of timber which were assumed to be part of the gallows.

=== Wren's Cottage ===
In 1864, when the English Martyrs mission was founded, the Diocese of Lancaster did not yet exist. Instead, it was the then Bishop of Liverpool who served the Catholic churches in Preston. In 1864, Bishop Alexander Goss sent Fr James Taylor to a house called Wren's Cottage. The cottage was a quarter of mile north of the present church. The house was made available for the priest and the stable was converted into a chapel. The first Mass was said there on 25 December 1864 and it was officially opened on 22 January 1865.

=== Building ===
As the chapel was only temporary and could fit 145 people, plans were drawn up to build a church that could accommodate a larger congregation. It was agreed when Wren's Cottage was bought that a church would not be built on the site, so the Corporation of Preston sold the land around Gallows Hill for the construction of the church.

On 26 May 1866, Bishop Goss laid the foundation stone for the church. It was designed by Edward Welby Pugin, the eldest son of Augustus Pugin. The church was initially meant to have a spire, but a lack of funds prevented it from being built.

On 1 December 1867, the church was officially opened by Bishop Goss with the assistance of the Bishop of Nottingham, Richard Roskell.

=== Enlargement ===
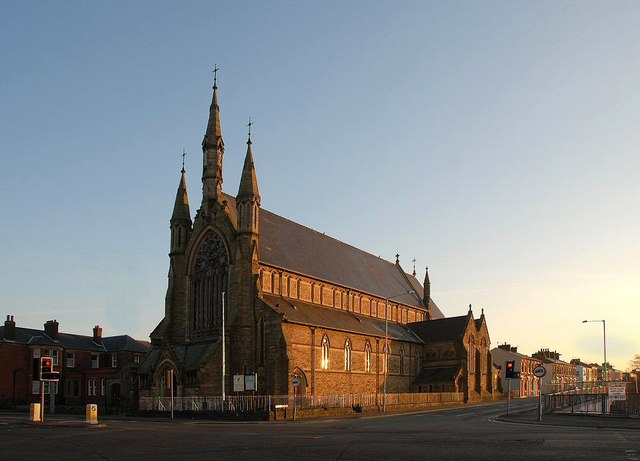
The church after E. W. Pugin's extension. The presbytery is to the left of the church

In 1874, Fr James Taylor left and was replaced by Fr Joseph A. Pyke. In 1886, he became rector of the church and immediately sought a solution to accommodating the increasing church congregation. He decided that the church needed to be enlarged so he brought in Edward Welby Pugin again to design an extension to the church.

The new plans added two new bays to the nave and aisles, a new chancel, two transepts, chapels, two additional confessionals, sacristies, and a room for meetings. An entrance was to be provided from St. George's Road to the south transept by a porch. The nave was to be divided from the chancel by an arch. The estimated cost of the extension was about £8,000.

The foundation stone of the new buildings was laid by the Bishop of Liverpool Bernard O'Reilly in 1887, and building work was finished in 1888.

On 8 February 1888, there was a solemn re-opening of the church. There were many church dignitaries present at the ceremony such as Bishop O'Reilly, Auxiliary Bishop Donnelly of Dublin, Bishop MacDonald of Argyll and the Isles, Bishop Hedley of Newport and Menevia, Bishop Knight of Shrewsbury, Bishop Vaughan of Salford and Bishop Lacy of Middlesbrough.

In 1902, Fr Pyke and was succeeded by his nephew, Fr Edward J. Pyke. During his time at the church, he worked to remove the debts that the church had accumulated from its construction and extension. Furthermore, he oversaw the handling of the parish, the nearby Catholic schools and the consecration of the church.

On 14 September 1921, the church was consecrated in a ceremony presided over by the Archbishop of Liverpool, Frederick Keating, with assistance from Bishop Casartelli of Salford, Bishop Cowgill of Leeds, Bishop Singleton of Shrewsbury and Auxiliary Bishop Vaughan of Salford.

=== 21st century ===
In 2012, the presbytery adjacent to the church became home to L'Arche a nearby charity that houses communities for those with learning disabilities. The furniture and paintings in the house were auctioned off, including Gothic style furniture from the time of the church's construction in the 1860s and 1880s. The auction also featured a selection of oil paintings on canvas depicting martyrs, saints and other religious scenes, six watercolour scenes by Preston artist Edwin Beattie, brass candlesticks and ornamental crucifixes.

On 11 July 2017, the Bishop of Lancaster, Michael Campbell announced that the church would be entrusted to the care of the Institute of Christ the King Sovereign Priest. The Institute have also been administering St Walburge's Church in Preston since 2014. The Institute of Christ the King Sovereign Priest relinquished responsibility for the church in 2024.

== Parish ==
Near to the church is English Martyrs Catholic Primary School. The school's mission statement says that it is 'based on the values in the life and teaching of Jesus Christ.

== See also ==
- Listed buildings in Preston, Lancashire
