= Thomas Flynn (bishop of Lancaster) =

English Catholic bishop (1880–1961)

The Right Reverend Thomas Flynn
- Bishop of Lancaster
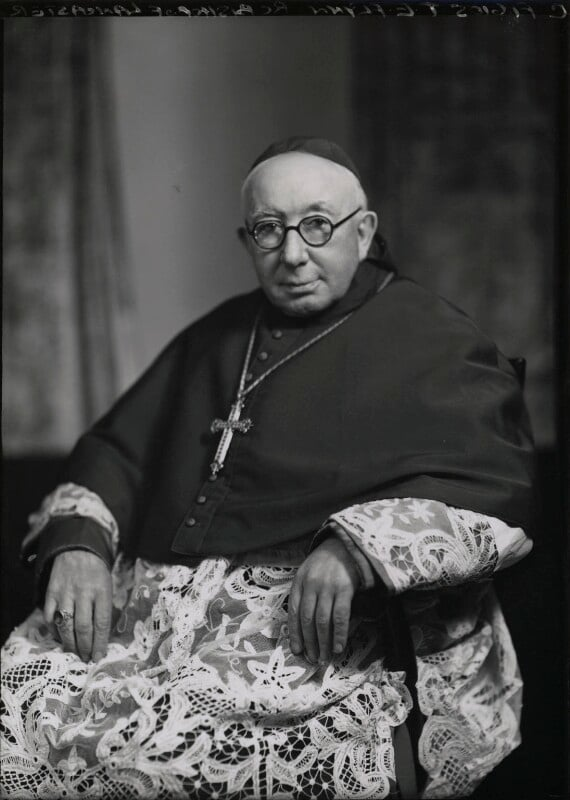
- Flynn in 1953
- Province: Liverpool
- Diocese: Lancaster
- See: Lancaster
- Installed: 12 June 1939
- Predecessor: Thomas Wulstan Pearson
- Successor: Brian Charles Foley

Orders
- Ordination: 13 June 1908 by Thomas Whiteside
- Consecration: 24 July 1939 by William Cardinal Godfrey

Personal details
- Born: 6 January 1880 Portsmouth
- Died: 3 November 1961 (aged 81)
- Buried: Lancaster Cathedral
- Denomination: Roman Catholic

Styles of Thomas Flynn
- Reference style: The Right Reverend
- Spoken style: My Lord
- Religious style: Bishop
- Posthumous style: not applicable

Thomas Edward Flynn (6 January 1880 – 3 November 1961) was an English prelate who served as the Roman Catholic Bishop of Lancaster from 1939 to 1961.

Born in Portsmouth, he was ordained to the priesthood on 13 June 1908. He was appointed the Bishop of the Diocese of Lancaster by the Holy See on 12 June 1939. His consecration to the Episcopate took place on 24 July 1939, the principal consecrator was William Godfrey, Cardinal-Archbishop of Westminster, and the principal co-consecrators were Edward Myers, Coadjutor Archbishop of Westminster and Joseph McCormack, Bishop of Hexham and Newcastle.

He died in office at aged 81.

Catholic Church titles
Preceded by Thomas Wulstan Pearson	Bishop of Lancaster; 1939–1961	Succeeded by Brian Charles Foley
