= Church of St Walburge, Preston =

St Walburge's Church
- Catholic Church of St Walburge's, Preston
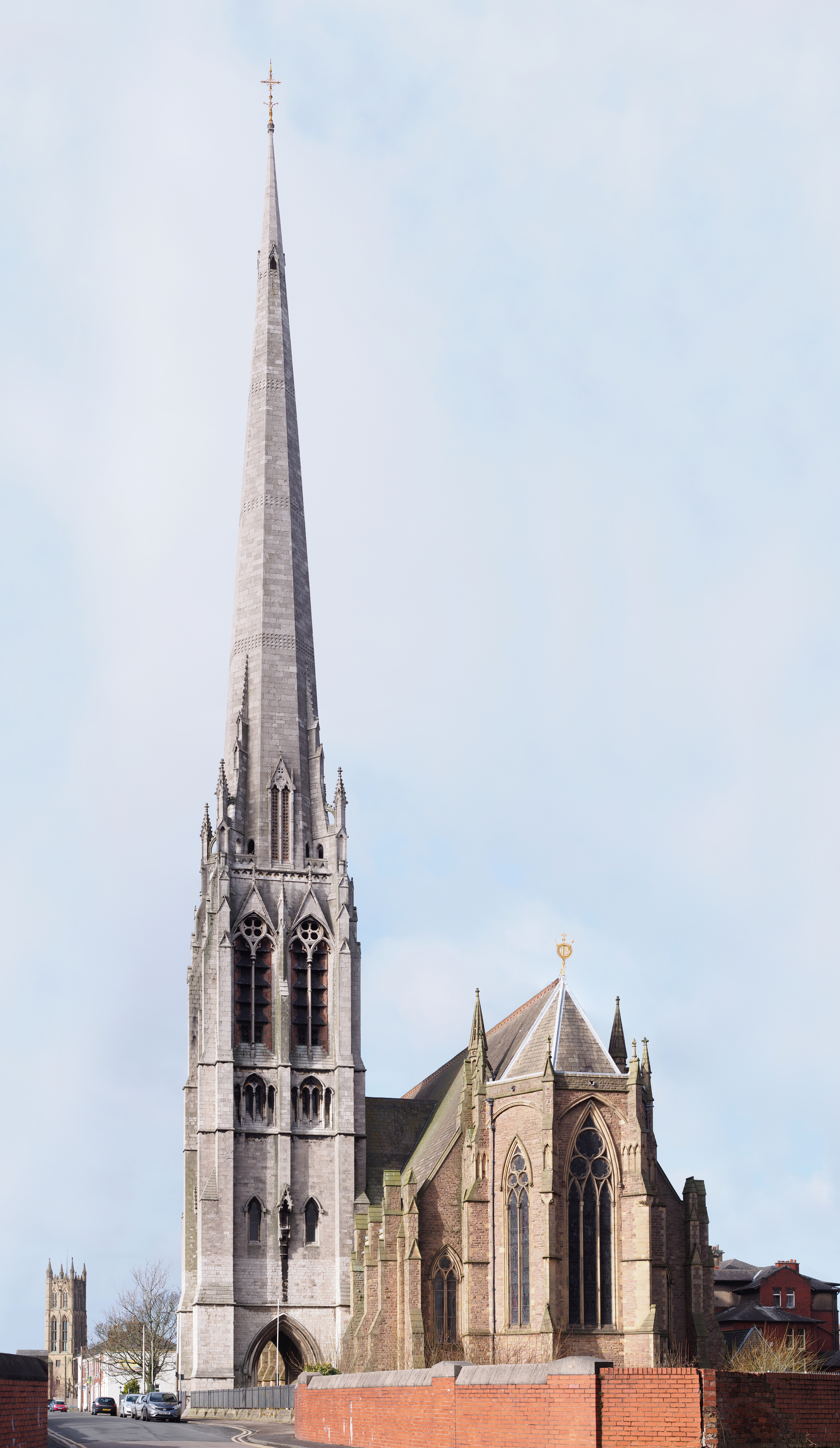
- View from the east, along Pedder Street, with St. Mark's in the distance

- Location in Preston
- 53.7629°N 2.7150°W
- OS grid reference: SD 52961 29851
- Location: Preston, Lancashire
- Country: England
- Denomination: Roman Catholic
- Website: icksp.org.uk/preston/

History
- Status: Active
- Founded: 1847
- Dedication: Saint Walpurga
- Consecrated: 3 August 1854

Architecture
- Heritage designation: Grade I
- Designated: 12 June 1950
- Architect: J. A. Hansom
- Style: Gothic Revival
- Groundbreaking: May 1850
- Completed: 1873

Specifications
- Length: 55 yards (50 m)
- Width: 18 yards (16 m)
- Materials: Sandstone body, slate roof Limestone steeple

Administration
- Province: Liverpool
- Diocese: Lancaster
- Deanery: Preston

Clergy
- Bishop: Bishop Paul Swarbrick
- Rector: Canon Gwenael Cristofoli

St Walburge's Church is a Roman Catholic church in Preston, Lancashire, England, northwest of the city centre on Weston Street. The church was built in the mid-19th century to a design by the Gothic Revival architect Joseph Hansom, the designer of the hansom cab, and is famous as having the tallest spire of any parish church in England. St Walburge's is recorded in the National Heritage List for England as a Grade I listed building.

In 2014 Michael Campbell, Roman Catholic Bishop of Lancaster, entrusted the church to the Institute of Christ the King Sovereign Priest as a shrine for Eucharistic Devotion.

== Dedication ==
St Walburge's is dedicated to Saint Walpurga, an English saint, born 710 AD., daughter of St Richard, a West Saxon king. With her two brothers, St Willibald and St Winibald, she went to Germany as a missionary. She was renowned for her miraculous healing of illnesses.

== History ==
St Walburge's Church is situated in the Maudlands district of Preston, so called because of its association with St Mary Magdalene of which name the word "Maudlands" is a corruption. St Walburge's is located near the site of a 12th-century leprosy hospital dedicated to St Mary Magdalene.

In 1847, at the time of the Roman Catholic revival in England, and with prosperity brought by the textile mills of Lancashire, the architect Joseph Hansom was commissioned to build a large church. Work began on the construction of the church in May 1850, and it was ready for its opening ceremony on 3 August 1854. The church was further extended in 1873 by the addition of a polygonal sanctuary with a central window 35 feet (11 m) high.

In 2007 St Walburge's, along with several other churches in Preston, was threatened with closure by the Catholic Diocese of Lancaster. The quality of its architecture, its significance to the parish and its landmark status in Preston led to great interest in its fate, and the closure was given a stay of seven years from August 2008 while local fund-raising drives sought to supplement grants for the restoration of the building. David Garrard, the Historic Churches Adviser of the Victorian Society said:

An outstanding building by an ingenious and imaginative architect, St Walburge's is one of Preston's greatest historic buildings. It was built to express the pride and confidence of the Roman Catholic community after legal restrictions on religious observance were lifted in the 19th century. To close it now would cost local people access to some of Lancashire's richest heritage.

On 4 April 2014 Michael Campbell, Roman Catholic Bishop of Lancaster, announced in a pastoral letter that

...Gilles Wach, General Prior of the Institute of Christ the King Sovereign Priest, and I – together with Father Simon Hawksworth - have agreed, to establish a foundation of the Institute at the Church of St Walburge, Preston - hopefully in the autumn. The arrival and presence of the institute in the church and presbytery at St Walburge's will enable the sustainability and care of this magnificent church so that it can be open each day as a shrine or centre for Eucharistic devotion and adoration. St Walburge's will remain part of the Parish of St Walburge and the Sacred Heart but will specifically provide for the celebration of Holy Mass and the other Sacraments in the Extraordinary Form of the Roman Rite. It is envisaged, however, that the current Ordinary Form Mass, will continue to be celebrated here on Sunday for as long as there is a pastoral need...

The Shrine Church was officially opened on 27 September 2014, with a High Mass celebrated by Gilles Wach, Prior General of the Institute of Christ the King, in the presence of Bishop Campbell. The Mass is celebrated daily at the Shrine and the Sacraments are offered in the Traditional Roman Rite according to the charter of the Institute of Christ the King.

== Architecture and features ==
=== Spire ===
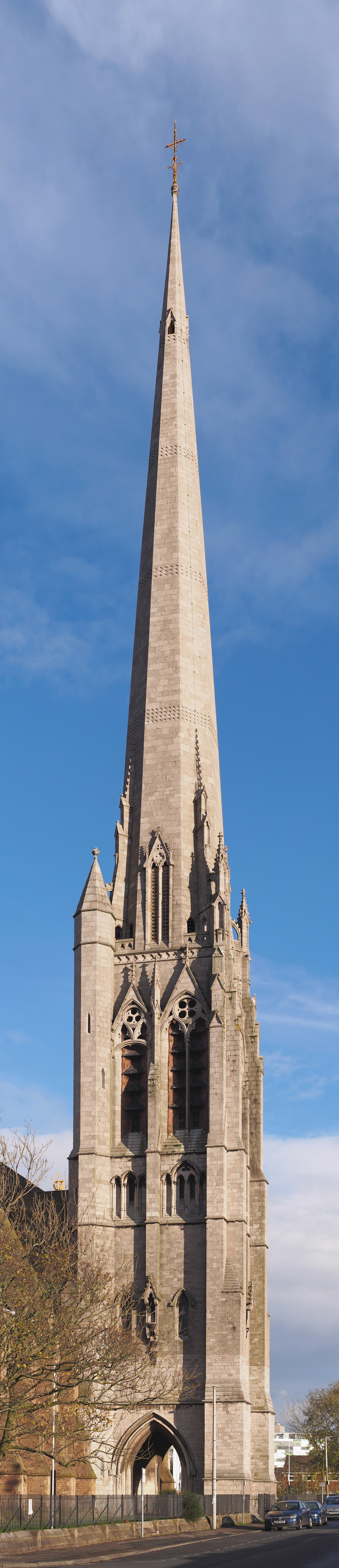
Vertical panorama of St Walburge's spire, viewed from the west

Externally, St Walburge's spire, rising to 309 feet (94 m) is the dominant landmark in Preston and is one of the tallest structures of any sort in Lancashire. After Salisbury and Norwich Cathedrals, it is the third tallest spire in the United Kingdom, and is the tallest on a parish church. The steeple is constructed from limestone sleepers which originally carried the nearby Preston and Longridge Railway, giving the spire a red tint during sunset. In 2014 the church was featured in the BBC series Fred Dibnah's Magnificent Monuments when the spire was the last to be worked upon by steeplejack and TV personality Fred Dibnah. Unable to complete the work due to television filming commitments, Dibnah's ladders were left at the church and were eventually given to the workman who completed the job.

The tower contains a single bell of 31 cwt (1.5 tonnes) cast by Mears and Stainbank of Whitechapel which is the heaviest swinging bell in Lancashire. The use of the bell is restricted, due to protected birds nesting in the belfry, meaning it can only be rung in winter months.

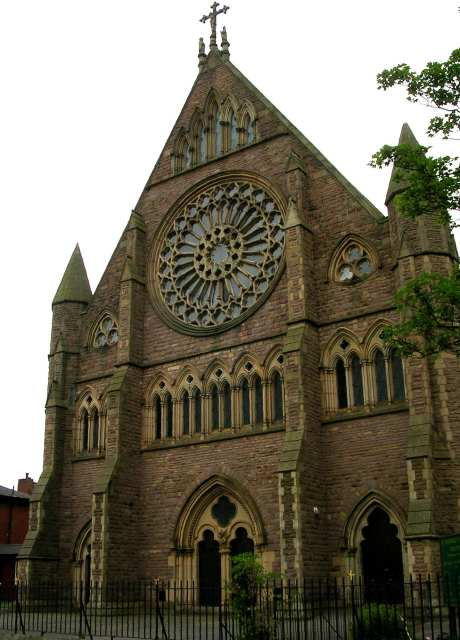
Western facade of St Walburge's, from Weston Street

The spire is occasionally open to the public at weekend evenings, via on-line booking. A small ticket charge is made in aid of church funds.

=== Exterior ===
St Walburge's is renowned not just for its height but also for the inventive quality of its architecture, in which the architect has looked to Gothic models, employing the traditional features in a creative and harmonious way. The Open Churches Trust says of St Walburge's that it "undoubtedly an architectural gem of the North West of England."

The New Red Sandstone facade presents as an unaisled church with a very steep gable. A strongly horizontal arcade, divides the facade into two zones, balanced by strongly projecting buttresses and corner pinnacles typical of many English Gothic cathedrals. The arcade is countered by the verticality of strongly projecting buttresses and corner pinnacles typical of many English Gothic cathedrals. The upper zone is dominated by a rose window 22 feet (7 m) in diameter occupying almost the full width of the nave.

=== Interior ===
The interior, which seats about 1,000 people, is 165 feet (50 m) long and 55 feet (17 m) wide. The open wooden roof of 83 feet (25 m) is supported by fourteen hammerbeams, on the ends of which stand lifesized carved the figures of saints. The church contains an organ by William Hill of London, 1855. Other significant features include a wooden triptych and a crucifix with the shield of Preston and the motto "Princeps Pacis". St. Ignatius of Loyola is also prominently represented to the right in the sanctuary, echoing the influence of the Jesuit priests still active in the city. The patron saints of Great Britain are also represented.

== Gallery ==
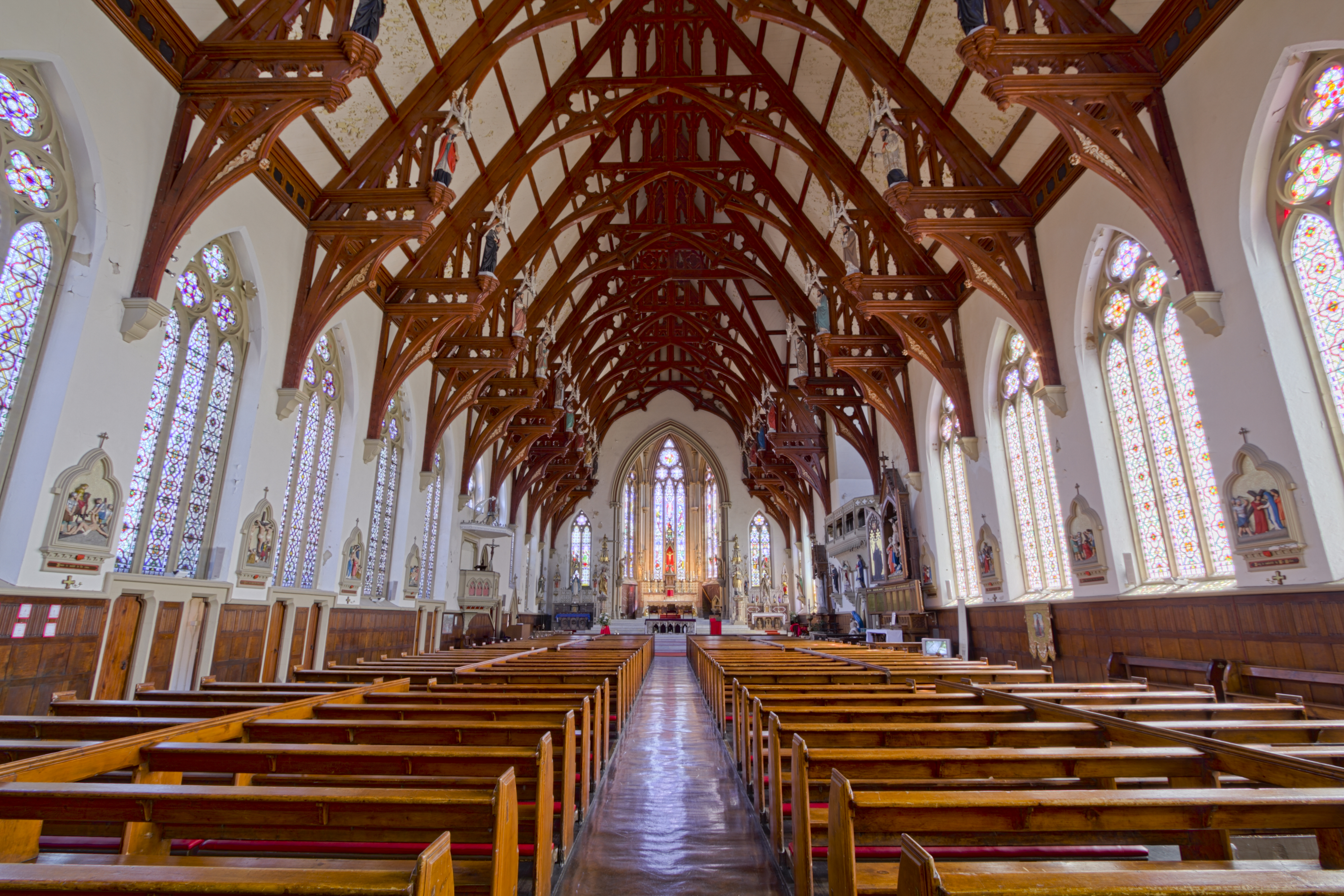
Inside the nave facing east towards the altar

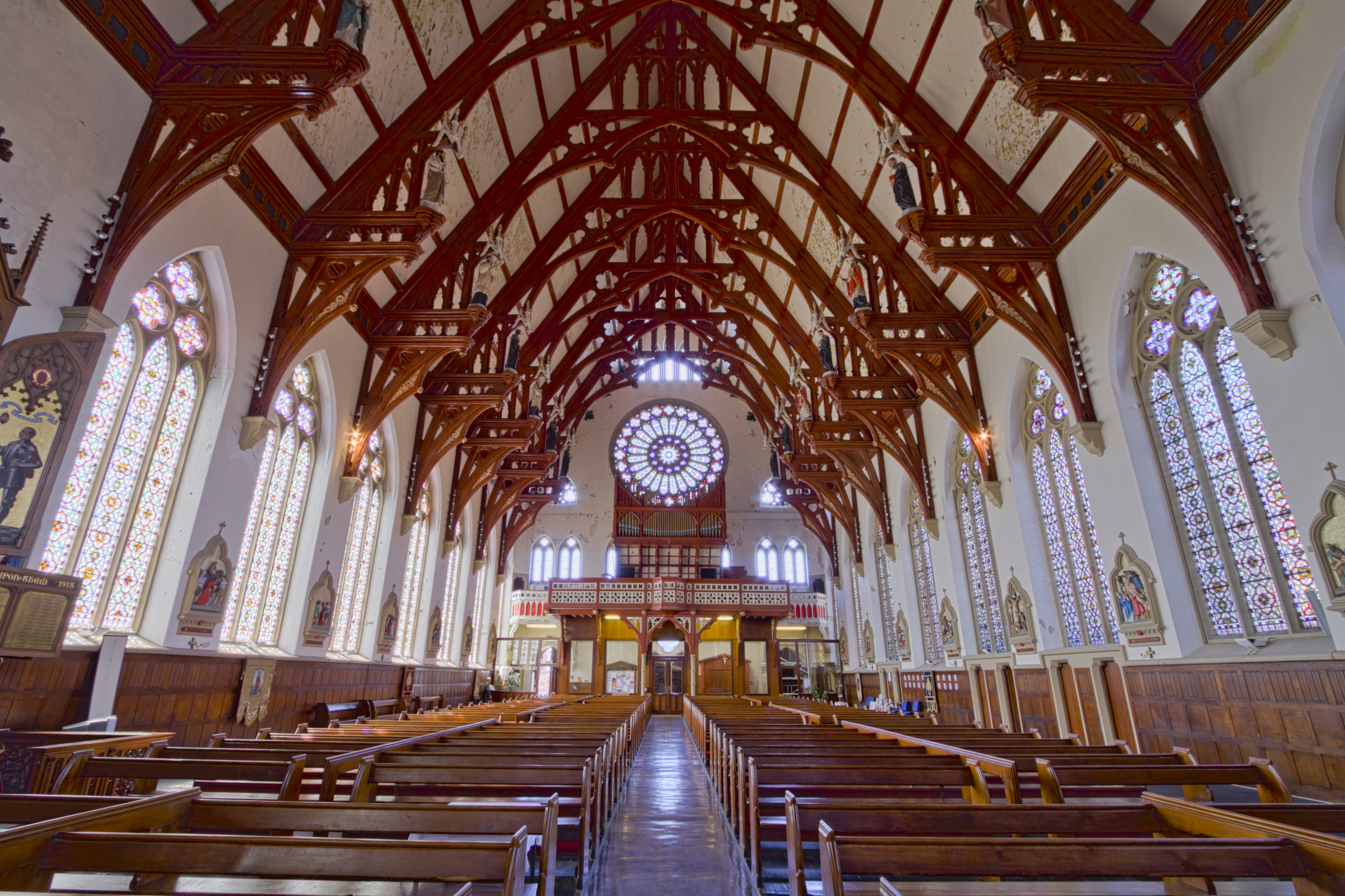
Inside the nave facing west towards the back of the church

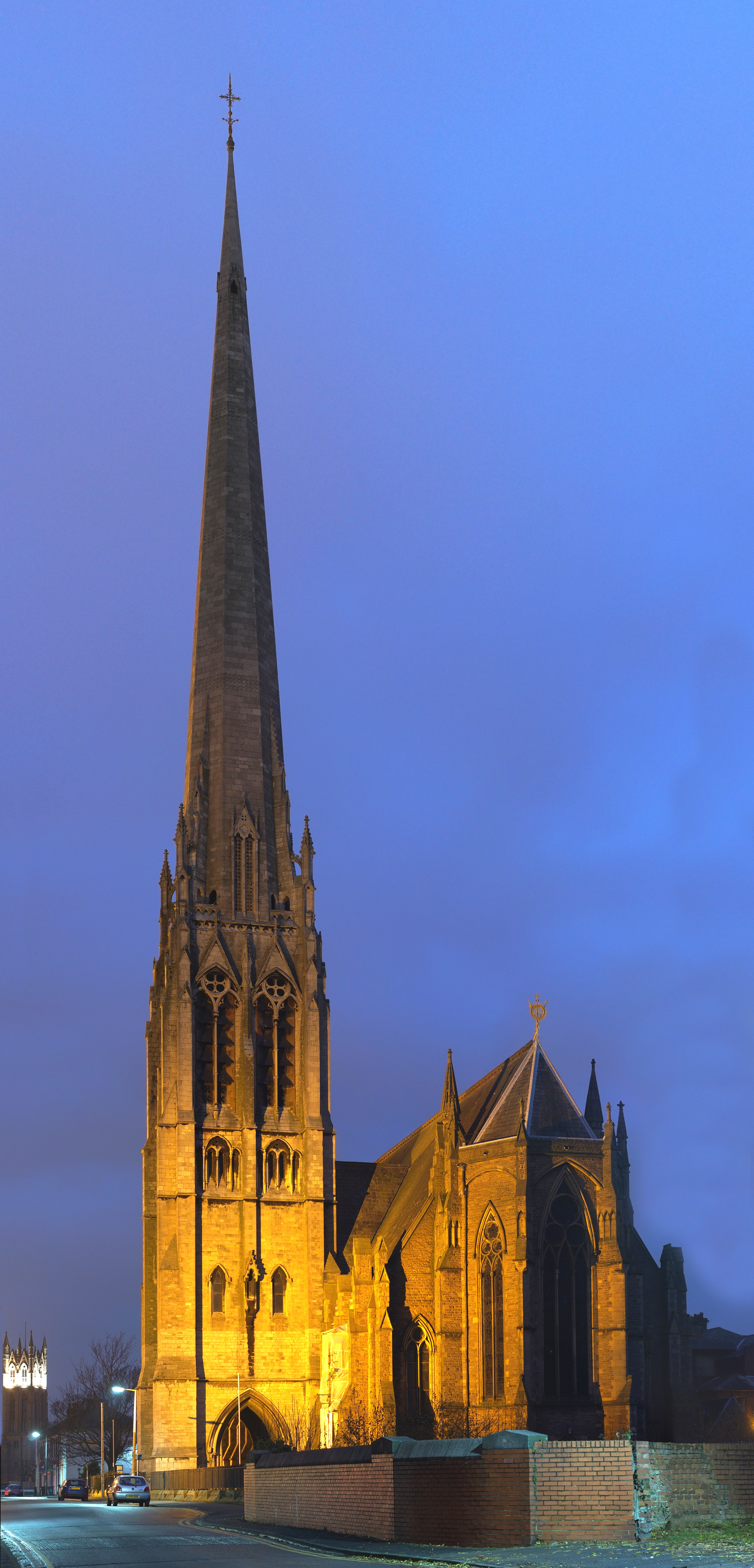
By night, from the east

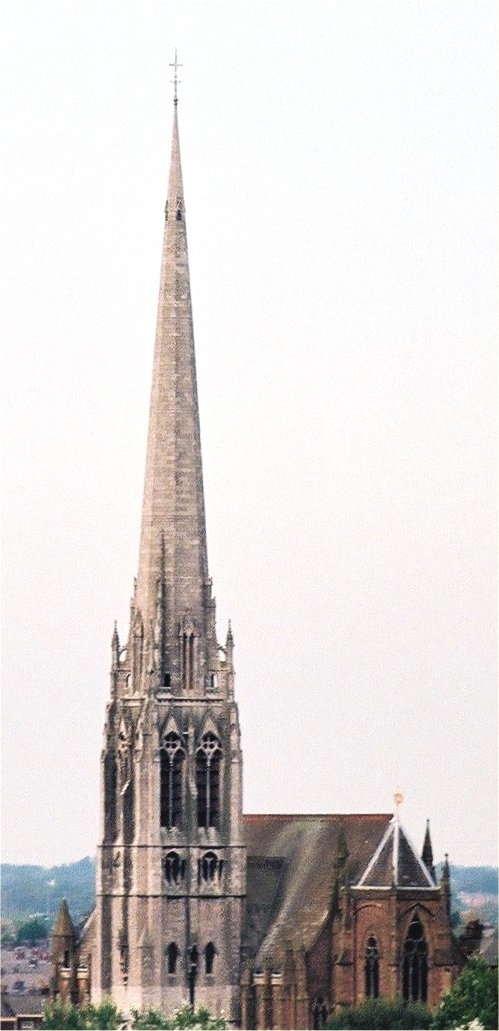
Viewed from the top of the car park of the Mall (St George's) Shopping Centre

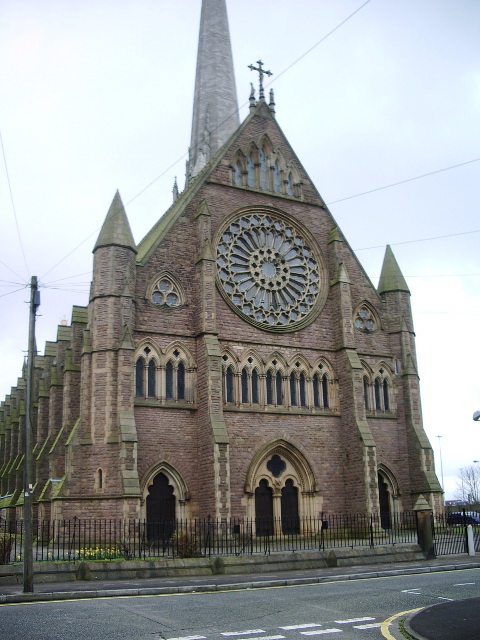
West end from Weston Street

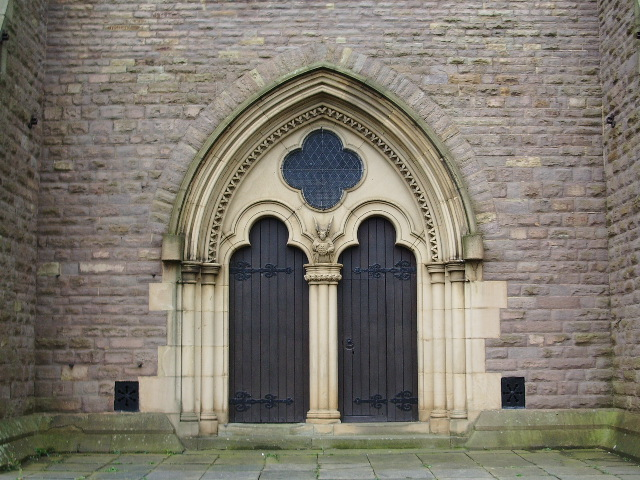
Doorway

== See also ==
- Grade I listed churches in Lancashire
- Listed buildings in Preston, Lancashire
- List of tallest churches
- List of tallest structures built before the 20th century
