= Patrick O'Donoghue (bishop) =

Irish Roman Catholic Bishop of Lancaster (1934–2021)

The Right Reverend Patrick O'Donoghue
- Bishop emeritus of Lancaster
- Church: Roman Catholic Church
- Province: Liverpool
- Diocese: Lancaster
- Appointed: 5 June 2001
- Installed: 4 July 2001
- Term ended: 1 May 2009
- Predecessor: John Brewer
- Successor: Michael Campbell
- Previous post: Auxiliary Bishop of Westminster

Orders
- Ordination: 25 May 1967
- Consecration: 29 June 1993 by Cardinal Basil Hume

Personal details
- Born: 4 May 1934 Mourne Abbey, County Cork, Ireland
- Died: 24 January 2021 (aged 86) Nazareth House, Mallow, County Cork, Ireland
- Denomination: Roman Catholic
- Parents: Daniel and Sheila O'Donoghue
- Motto: Beati Pauperes

Patrick O'Donoghue (4 May 1934 – 24 January 2021) was an Irish Roman Catholic bishop who served as the fifth Bishop of Lancaster, who led the diocese from 2001 to 2009.

== Early life ==
He was born in the small parish of Mourne Abbey in County Cork, Ireland on 4 May 1934, one of five children of farmers Daniel and Sheila O'Donoghue. O'Donoghue came to Britain in 1959 to train for the priesthood first at Campion House, Osterley, Middlesex, then from 1961 to 1967 at Allen Hall seminary when it was at St Edmund's, Ware. He was ordained to the priesthood for the Archdiocese of Westminster in England on 25 May 1967.

== Episcopal ministry ==
He was appointed an Auxiliary Bishop of Westminster and Titular Bishop of Tulana on 18 May 1993. His consecration to the episcopate took place on 29 June 1993, the principal consecrator was Basil Hume, Cardinal-Archbishop of Westminster and the principal co-consecrators were John Patrick Crowley, Bishop of Middlesbrough and Patrick Joseph Casey, Bishop Emeritus of Brentwood. As an auxiliary bishop, O'Donoghue had particular oversight for the West London area; he succeeded in this role the late Bishop Gerald Mahon, who had died in office in January 1992.

Following the sudden death of John Brewer O'Donoghue was appointed the Bishop of Lancaster on 5 June 2001, and installed at St Peter's Cathedral, Lancaster on 4 July 2001. His portrait was painted for Westminster Cathedral in 2002 by Christian Furr.

=== Diocesan situation ===
In 2007 he led a major diocesan review called Fit for Mission? to prepare the diocese for the future with fewer priests, practising Catholics and attempting to encourage all Catholics to be more missionary-focussed.

=== Catholic schools ===
In November 2007, he brought out his teaching document on Catholic education, Fit for Mission? – Schools. Hailed in the Catholic press as 'groundbreaking' and 'courageous', it was also praised by the Holy See. The Congregation for Clergy 'hopes it will become an example for other Dioceses in the country in their implementation of the General Directory for Catechesis and the Catechism of the Catholic Church', and the Congregation for Catholic Education wrote, it will undoubtedly be a reliable resource for renewing the vitality of Catholic Education in today's society.

O'Donoghue was an opponent of attempts to secularise the culture of Catholic schools in the Diocese of Lancaster. For instance, he gave instructions to the schools to halt promotion of contraceptives, remove "anti-Catholic" books from their libraries and prevent the presentation of ideas contrary to the Catholic Church's official teaching. Some secularist critics, such as Barry Sheerman, a Labour MP and Steve Sinnott of the National Union of Teachers attacked him for his views on education in Catholic schools.

=== Catholic Caring Services ===
In October 2008 he came into direct conflict with trustees of the local Catholic-founded adoption agency, Catholic Caring Services (CCS), which was attempting to enact homosexual adoption contrary to Church teachings, following the UK government's Sexual Orientation Regulations. In a letter to the agency he threatened them with eviction from church property, warned that he would sue the CCS for money left in wills by Catholics to the agency if they did not change their stance within one week, threatened to inform the Charities Commission that the organisation was no longer Catholic, and would break its link with the Lancaster diocese:

I find it unthinkable, indeed heart-breaking, that Catholic Caring Services, so linked to the Catholic Church since its inception, would abandon its position and capitulate to recent same-sex adoption legislation.

== Retirement and death ==
O'Donoghue retired on 1 May 2009, with a special Mass at St Peter's Cathedral, Lancaster, and assumed the title Bishop Emeritus of Lancaster. He left the Diocese of Lancaster on 29 May 2009 and retired as an assistant priest to the parish of Bantry on the west coast of County Cork, Ireland. He died on 24 January 2021 at the Nazareth House care home at Dromahane, where he had been resident after becoming infirm.

Religious titles
Preceded by John Brewer	Bishop of Lancaster; 2001–2009	Succeeded by Michael Gregory Campbell
