= George Lamb (disambiguation) =

George Lamb (born 1979) is an English radio and TV presenter.

George Lamb may also refer to:

- George Lamb (politician) (1784–1834), British member of parliament and writer
- George Hamilton Lamb (1900–1943), Australian politician and prisoner-of-war
- George "Larry" Lamb (1923–2022), pilot and rugby referee

== See also ==
- George Lam (born 1947), Hong Kong singer
