= Bishop of Lancaster =

Bishop of Lancaster may refer to:

- The Anglican Bishop of Lancaster (a suffragan bishop in the Diocese of Blackburn)
- The Roman Catholic Bishop of Lancaster (the ordinary of the Roman Catholic Diocese of Lancaster)
