= Paul Swarbrick =

British Roman Catholic bishop

The Right Reverend Paul Swarbrick
- Bishop of Lancaster
- Church: Roman Catholic Church
- Province: Liverpool
- Diocese: Lancaster
- See: Lancaster
- Appointed: 12 February 2018
- Installed: 9 April 2018
- Predecessor: Michael Gregory Campbell

Orders
- Ordination: 10 July 1982 by Brian Charles Foley
- Consecration: 9 April 2018 by Michael Gregory Campbell

Personal details
- Born: 2 July 1958 (age 67) Garstang, Lancashire, England
- Denomination: Roman Catholic
- Motto: Sanctitas Praeter Pacem ("Holiness before peace")
- Coat of arms

Paul Swarbrick (born 2 July 1958) is a Roman Catholic prelate, who has served as Bishop of Lancaster since 2018.

== Early life and education ==
Born on 2 July 1958 at Garstang, Lancashire, England, Swarbrick was educated at St.Mary and Michael’s Primary School, Garstang, and Lancaster Royal Grammar School, an all-boys school in Lancashire's county town.

A distant cousin of Mgr Thomas Adamson, he prepared for Holy Orders at Ushaw College, a seminary in County Durham.

== Ordained ministry ==
On 10 July 1982, at the age of 24, he was ordained a priest by Bishop Brian Foley at St Mary and St Michael's Church, Garstang, in the Roman Catholic Diocese of Lancaster.

Swarbrick served as Assistant Priest at St Mary's Church, Kells, Whitehaven (1982–1983), and at St Maria Goretti Church, Preston (1983–1984), before moving to Blackpool, where he served as chaplain to St Mary's Catholic High School and Assistant Priest at St Cuthbert's Church from 1984 to 1990. From 1990 to 2005, he undertook missionary work in the Diocese of Monze, Zambia. Returning to England, he was an assistant priest at Church of St Thomas of Canterbury and the English Martyrs, Preston. Then, he served as parish priest of Sacred Heart, Preston and St Walburge, Preston (2007 to 2010) and of Our Lady and St Michael, Workington (2010 to 2018).

=== Episcopal ministry ===
On 12 February 2018, Pope Francis appointed him Bishop of Lancaster, being consecrated on 9 April 2018 by his predecessor, Bishop Michael Campbell.

Catholic Church titles
Preceded by Michael Campbell	Bishop of Lancaster; 2018 to present	Incumbent
