= Psilopsida =

Psilopsida may refer to:

- Psilotopsida or Psilopsida, a class of ferns in current classifications
- Psilophytopsida or Psilopsida, a now obsolete class used for a group of extinct plants
