= Douthwaite =

Douthwaite is a surname. Notable people with the surname include:

- Arthur Henry Douthwaite (1896–1974), British physician and writer
- Christopher Thomas Douthwaite (1875–1949), British politician
- Harold Douthwaite (1900–1972), English cricketer
- Pat Douthwaite (1934–2002), Scottish artist
- Richard Douthwaite (1942–2011), British economist, ecologist, campaigner and writer
