= Douglas Johnson (historian) =

British historian

Douglas William John Johnson (1 February 1925 – 28 April 2005) was a British historian. He was Professor of Modern History at the University of Birmingham from 1963 to 1968, and Professor of French History at University College London from 1968 to 1990.

== Life ==
Johnson was born on 1 February 1925 in Edinburgh, Scotland. He attended the Royal Grammar School in Lancaster, Lancashire, England. He studied history Worcester College, Oxford, having been awarded a scholarship. There was a break in his studies as he served in the Second World War with the Northamptonshire Regiment from 1943 to 1944. Having been invalided out of the British Army, he returned to Oxford and graduated in 1946 with a second-class honours Bachelor of Arts (BA) degree. In 1950, he married Madeleine Rébillard, with whom he had a daughter.

His academic career was as a historian of France. He joined the University of Birmingham as a lecturer in modern history in 1949. He was made Professor of Modern History in 1963, and served as Chair of the School of History between 1963 and 1968. He then moved to London, where he was Professor of French History at University College London from 1968 to 1990.

His books included France and the Dreyfus Affair (1966), France for the Thames & Hudson 'Nations and Peoples' series (1969), An Idea of Europe with Richard Hoggart (1987) and The Age of Illusion: Art and Politics in France, 1918-1940 with his wife Madeleine (1987). In the 1970s he was General Editor of The Making of the Modern World series of history volumes, published by Ernest Benn Limited. From 1983 he was General Editor of the Fontana History of Modern France.

Unashamedly Francophile, Johnson devoted his academic career to improving relations between France and Britain. He became an advisor to Margaret Thatcher on all matters concerning France, although his own political position was always something of a mystery.

Johnson died from oesophageal cancer at the Royal Free Hospital in London on 28 April 2005, at the age of 80.

== Honours ==
A collection of essays in his honour was compiled by Martyn Cornick and Ceri Crossley under the title Problems in French History and published by Palgrave in 2000.

Johnson was awarded a number of honours by the French government: National Order of Merit (1980); Commandeur of the Ordre des Palmes Académiques (1987); and Chevalier (1990) then Officier (1997) of the Legion of Honour. He did not receive any honours from the British government.
