= Thomas Pearson (bishop) =

Thomas Wulstan Pearson, O.S.B. (1870–1938) was an English prelate who served as the first Roman Catholic Bishop of Lancaster from 1924 to 1938. Not to be confused with Thomas Bernard Pearson, auxiliary bishop in the same diocese from 1949 to 1983.

Born in Preston, Lancashire on 4 January 1870, he was ordained a priest in the Order of Saint Benedict on 26 September 1897. He was the first Prior of Ealing Prioy (now Ealing Abbey) between 1916 and 1925. He was appointed the Bishop of the Diocese of Lancaster by the Holy See on 18 December 1924. His consecration to the Episcopate took place on 24 February 1925. The principal consecrator was Frederick William Keating, Archbishop of Liverpool, and the principal co-consecrators were Joseph Butt, Auxiliary Bishop of Westminster and Robert Dobson, Auxiliary Bishop of Liverpool.

He died in office on 1 December 1938, aged 68.

Catholic Church titles
New title	Bishop of Lancaster; 1924–1938	Succeeded by Thomas Flynn
