= Philip Moffat =

English cricketer

Personal information
- Full name: Philip John Moffat
- Born: 29 May 1975 (age 51); Lancaster, Lancashire, England
- Batting: Right-handed
- Bowling: Right-arm medium
- Relatives: Gavin Moffat (brother)

Domestic team information
- Years: Team
- 1998: Cambridge University

Career statistics
Competition	First-class
Matches	5
Runs scored	34
Batting average	6.80
100s/50s	–/–
Top score	12
Balls bowled	546
Wickets	7
Bowling average	33.14
5 wickets in innings	–
10 wickets in match	–
Best bowling	3/25
Catches/stumpings	–/–
- Source: Cricinfo, 15 January 2022

Philip John Moffat (born 29 May 1975) is an English former first-class cricketer.

Moffat was born at Lancaster in May 1975. He was educated at Lancaster Royal Grammar School, before matriculating to the University of Leeds. From there he proceeded to Hughes Hall at the University of Cambridge. While studying at Cambridge, he played first-class cricket for Cambridge University Cricket Club in 1998, making five appearances. Playing as a medium pace bowler in the Cambridge side, he took 7 wickets at an average of 33.14, with best figures of 3 for 25. As a lower order batsman, he scored 34 runs with a highest score of 12. His brother, Gavin, was also a first-class cricketer.
