= Ronald Halstead =

British businessman (1927–2021)

Sir Ronald Halstead KBE
- Sir Ronald Halstead in 1967
- Born: 17 May 1927; Lancaster, Lancashire
- Died: 18 June 2021 (aged 94)
- Education: Queens' College, Cambridge
- Occupation: Businessman
- Known for: Chairman and Chief Executive of Beecham Group (1984-1985); Deputy Chairman of British Steel (1986-1994)

Sir Ronald Halstead KBE (17 May 1927 – 18 June 2021) was a British businessman who was chairman and chief executive of the Beecham Group from 1984 to 1985 and deputy chairman of British Steel from 1986 to 1994.

== Biography ==
Halstead was born on 17 May 1927 in Lancaster, Lancashire, to Richard Halstead and Bessie (née Harrison), the elder of two sons. He was educated at Lancaster Royal Grammar School and Queens' College, Cambridge, where he obtained a M.A. degree in natural science and gained an athletics Blue.

He began his working life as a research chemist with H. P. Bulmer. He joined Beecham in 1954 as a manufacturing manager with Macleans Ltd. In 1955, he was posted to the US as factory manager of Beecham Products Inc. (USA), rising to become President of Beecham Research Labs Inc. (USA) in 1962. He returned to the U.K. in 1964, joining the board of Beecham, and became managing director for consumer products in 1973. He was appointed chairman and chief executive of Beecham Group in 1984, leaving in 1985 after 18 months following a boardroom coup. Halstead joined the board of British Steel as a non-executive director in 1979, becoming deputy chairman in 1986 until 1994. He held numerous directorships, appointments in government and industry working groups and other organisations.

Halstead was appointed Commander of the Order of the British Empire (CBE) in 1976 for services to the food industry and knighted in 1985. He was married twice: in 1968 to Yvonne de Monchaux (died 1978) with whom he had two children, and in 2000 to Susanne Stoessl (died 2013). He died on 18 June 2021, aged 94, of heart failure.
