= Colin Povey =

English cricketer administrator

Colin Povey (born 1960 or 1961) was the Chief Executive of Warwickshire County Cricket Club for ten years until December 2025. He was formerly Chief Executive of Carlsberg.

== Biography ==
Povey was educated at the Lancaster Royal Grammar School, before studying modern history at Liverpool University. After graduating, he joined the engineering company TI Group, where he remained for five years before moving to Thames Water. He then moved to Carlsberg-Tetley as human resources director in 1995, before becoming commercial director and finally chief executive in January 2001.

He captained England at Water Polo and played for and coached the Great Britain side. He was also a non-executive director of the Northampton Saints rugby club.

== Personal life ==
Povey is married to Jan, and has three children.
