= Trevor Glover =

English cricketer and rugby union player

Personal information
- Full name: Trevor Richardson Glover
- Born: 26 November 1951 (age 74); Lancaster, Lancashire, England
- Batting: Right-handed
- Bowling: Right-arm off break

Domestic team information
- Years: Team
- 1973–1975: Oxford University

Career statistics
Competition	First-class	List A
Matches	22	6
Runs scored	769	47
Batting average	18.75	7.83
100s/50s	2/1	–/–
Top score	117	28
Balls bowled	12	0
Wickets	0	–
Bowling average	–	–
5 wickets in innings	–	–
10 wickets in match	–	–
Best bowling	–	–
Catches/stumpings	14/–	–/–
- Source: Cricinfo, 29 August 2019

Trevor Richardson Glover (born 26 November 1951) is an English former cricketer and rugby union player.

Glover was born at Lancaster and was educated at the Lancaster Royal Grammar School. From there he went up to Lincoln College, Oxford. While studying at Oxford, he made his debut in first-class cricket for Oxford University against Surrey at Oxford in 1973. He played first-class cricket for Oxford until 1975, making 22 appearances. He scored 769 runs at an average of 18.75. He made two centuries, with a high score of 117 against Worcestershire in 1975, the same season he captained Oxford. In addition to playing first-class cricket, Glover also appeared in List A one-day cricket, making two appearances for Oxford University in the 1973 Benson & Hedges Cup, before making four further appearances for the Combined Universities cricket team in the 1975 Benson & Hedges Cup. He gained blues in both cricket and rugby union while at Oxford, where he appeared for Oxford University RFC, before later playing for Bedford Blues.
