= Alexander Birtwistle =

British Army officer

- Born: 1948 (age 77–78)
- Allegiance: United Kingdom
- Branch: British Army
- Service years: 1967–2001
- Rank: Brigadier
- Education: University of Cambridge

Brigadier Alexander Frederick Birtwistle CBE (born 1948) is a retired British Army officer who is most well known for his role in the 2001 United Kingdom foot-and-mouth outbreak.

Alex Birtwistle was born in Accrington and attended Lancaster Royal Grammar School. He joined the Army as a university cadet at the University of Cambridge in 1967 and was commissioned into the Queen's Lancashire Regiment following his graduation in 1970. He then saw service in Cyprus, Nigeria, Northern Ireland and Germany and as an aide-de-camp to Her Majesty the Queen. He was also Commander of the 1st Battalion Queen's Lancashire Regiment and was awarded an OBE in the 1992 Queen's Birthday Honours.

He was due to retire aged 53 on 2 April 2001 as the commander of the 42 (North West) Brigade based at Fulwood Barracks, Preston when he was asked to oversee the livestock mass burial site at a disused airfield near Great Orton, Cumbria. He supervised the disposal of thousands of sheep which were culled on site or brought there from Carlisle abattoir. He said at the time:

The Army is here to set up systems to deal with the problem. I hope this is going to work, because if it doesn't the consequences for this area are terrible.

He was appointed a CBE in the 2002 New Year Honours for his role in the crisis.

On 6 February 2011 he appeared on television in an edition of the BBC 1 programme Countryfile. He contributed his recollections of the crisis and was seen with John Craven and retired farmer William Littleat, planting an oak tree to mark the tenth anniversary of the crisis at the Watchtree Nature Reserve that has been created on the Great Orton airfield site.
