= Psilophytopsida =

Order of an extinct plant group

Psilophytopsida is a now obsolete class containing one order, Psilophytales, which was previously used to classify a number of extinct plants which are now placed elsewhere. The class was established in 1917, under the name Psilophyta, with only three genera (Rhynia, Horneophyton and Psilophyton) for a group of fossil plants from the Upper Silurian and Devonian periods which lack true roots and leaves, but have a vascular system within a branching cylindrical stem. The living Psilotaceae, the whisk-ferns, were sometimes added to the class, which was then usually called Psilopsida. This classification is no longer in use.

The class should not be confused with the current use of the name Psilotopsida, which refers to a class of living ferns, containing only Psilotaceae (whisk-ferns) and Ophioglossaceae (moon-worts and adder's-tongue ferns).

== Description ==
The class was created in 1917 by Kidston and Lang for fossils found in the Rhynie Chert Bed. Three genera were initially included, Rhynia, Horneophyton and Psilophyton. All lacked leaves and true roots, consisting only of branched stems; however they were considered to contain vascular tissue.

Additional fossil genera were added later. As described by Sporne in 1966, Psilophytopsida consisted of four families:

- Rhyniaceae
  - Rhynia – now placed in the class Rhyniopsida
  - Horneophyton – now placed in the class Horneophytopsida
  - Cooksonia – now considered to be paraphyletic basal trachaeophytes
  - Yarravia – uncertain position
- Zosterophyllaceae – now placed in the class Zosterophyllopsida
  - Zosterophyllum
- Psilophytaceae
  - Psilophyton – now considered to be a basal euphyllophyte
- Asteroxylaceae – now placed in the order Drepanophycales
  - Asteroxylon

By 1975, it had become clear that the class had become increasingly unnatural, containing unrelated early vascular plants. It was split up by Banks into three subdivisions: Rhyniophytina, Zosterophyllophytina, and Trimerophytina. Later cladistic analyses of early land plants suggested that at least the rhyniophytes and the trimerophytes were not monophyletic. Separating out 'basal groups', such as the earliest land plants, is intrinsically difficult, since at this stage they contain many shared characters (plesiomorphies) which are not sufficient to distinguish them.

The current classification of former members of the class is largely due to Kenrick and Crane in 1997.
