= Jack Brewer (bishop) =

UK Catholic bishop (1929–2000)

John Brewer
- Bishop of Lancaster
- Church: Catholic Church
- Diocese: Diocese of Lancaster
- In office: 22 May 1985 – 10 June 2000
- Predecessor: Brian Foley
- Successor: Patrick O'Donoghue
- Previous posts: Coadjutor Bishop of Lancaster (1983-1985); Titular Bishop of Britonia (1971-1983); Auxiliary Bishop of Shrewsbury (1971-1983)

Orders
- Ordination: 8 July 1956
- Consecration: 28 July 1971 by William Grasar

Personal details
- Born: 24 November 1929 Manchester, Lancashire, United Kingdom
- Died: 10 June 2000 (aged 70)

Bishop John Brewer (24 November 1929 – 10 June 2000) was the fourth Roman Catholic Bishop of Lancaster, England. He was ordained a priest in the Diocese of Shrewsbury, where he became Auxiliary Bishop on 28 July 1971.

Brewer became Coadjutor Bishop of Lancaster on 15 November 1983 and, upon the retirement of Brian Charles Foley, he became Bishop of Lancaster on 22 May 1985. He died of cancer, while still in office, on 10 June 2000 and was succeeded on 4 July 2001 by Patrick O'Donoghue.

Religious titles
Preceded by Brian Charles Foley	Bishop of Lancaster; 1985-2000	Succeeded by Patrick O'Donoghue
