= Alma Calderwood =

Scottish historian and archivist (died 1983)

Alma B. Calderwood (died 1983) was a Scottish historian and archivist. She was employed for many years at the Scottish Record Office, now known as National Records of Scotland.

The Buik of the Kirk of the Canagait, 1564–1567 (Edinburgh: Scottish Record Society, 1961)

== Career ==
Alma Calderwood was educated at Edinburgh Ladies College (later known as The Mary Erskine School). She studied history at the University of Edinburgh where she was taught by Peter Hume Brown and Robert Kerr Hannay. After her Masters, she began a PhD on the reign of Robert the Bruce but abandoned the project due to poor health. She was employed by the Scottish Record Office from 1921, and worked to catalogue the Register of Sasines. A colleague, Athol Murray, noted that her pay was poor "even by the standards of the time". She was promoted to an Assistant Keeper post in 1950 and retired in 1958, after working on the Cassillis muniments, the papers of the Marquess of Ailsa. She also taught legal forms and palaeography to new staff members from December 1947.

== Publications ==
- Acts of the Lords of Council, 1501–1503 (Edinburgh: HMSO, 1993).
- The Buik of the Kirk of the Canagait, 1564–1567 (Edinburgh: Scottish Record Society, 1961).
