= Stuart Westley =

English cricketer

Personal information
- Full name: Stuart Alker Westley
- Born: 21 March 1947 (age 79); Preston, Lancashire, England
- Batting: Right-handed
- Role: Wicket-keeper
- Relatives: Roger Westley (twin brother)

Domestic team information
- Years: Team
- 1976: Minor Counties
- 1973–1984: Suffolk
- 1969–1971: Gloucestershire
- 1968–1969: Oxford University

Career statistics
Competition	First-class	List A
Matches	34	13
Runs scored	557	109
Batting average	15.59	15.57
100s/50s	–/2	–/–
Top score	93*	28
Balls bowled	–	–
Wickets	–	–
Bowling average	–	–
5 wickets in innings	–	–
10 wickets in match	–	–
Best bowling	–	–
Catches/stumpings	71/9	24/2
- Source: Cricinfo, 27 July 2011

Stuart Alker Westley (born 21 March 1947) is a former English cricketer. Westley was a right-handed batsman who fielded as a wicket-keeper. Following his cricket career he became a prominent educator and teachers leader. He was born in Preston, Lancashire and was educated at Lancaster Royal Grammar School.

Westley made his first-class debut for Oxford University against Gloucestershire in 1968. He made 20 further first-class appearances for the university, the last of which came against Oxford University in 1969. In his 21 first-class appearance for the university, he scored 412 runs at an average of 15.25, with a high score of 93 not out. This score, one of two first-class fifties he made, came against Warwickshire in 1969. Behind the stumps he took 50 catches and made 4 stumpings. While at Oxford, he also played 2 first-class matches for Oxford and Cambridge Universities against the touring Australians in 1968 and the touring West Indians in 1969.

With the conclusion of his studies, Westley joined Gloucestershire later in the 1969 English cricket season, making his first-class debut for the county against Glamorgan. He made 9 further first-class appearances for Gloucestershire, the last of which came against Middlesex in the 1971 County Championship. In his 10 first-class matches for Gloucestershire, he scored 138 runs at an average of 17.25, with a high score of 35 not out. Behind the stumps he took 19 catches and made 3 stumpings. He made his List A debut against Northamptonshire in the 1969 Player's County League. He made 6 further List A appearances for Gloucestershire, the last of which came against Somerset in the 1971 John Player League. In these matches, he scored 13 runs at an average of 6.50, with a high score of 7 not out, while behind the stumps he took 13 catches and made 2 stumpings. He taught during the winter months, but with opportunities proving limited at Gloucestershire, he decided the leave the county and become a full-time teacher. He later reminisced about his career, describing himself as a wicket-keeper "who chipped in with the bat on a good day".

He later taught mathematics at Framlingham College in Suffolk, a position he held from 1973 to 1984. While teaching he played Minor counties cricket for Suffolk, making his debut for the county in the 1973 Minor Counties Championship against Hertfordshire. He played Minor counties cricket for Suffolk from 1973 to 1984, making 85 Minor Counties Championship and 2 MCCA Knockout Trophy appearances. In 1976, he played his final first-class match for the Minor Counties against the touring West Indians. In this match, he was dismissed for 4 runs by Bernard Julien. In their second-innings he run out for 7. He took 2 catches behind the stumps, both coming in the West Indians first-innings. He made his first List A appearance for Suffolk against Sussex in the 1978 Gillette Cup. He made 5 further List A appearances for the county, the last of which came against Derbyshire in the 1983 NatWest Trophy. In his 6 List A matches for Suffolk, he took scored 96 runs at an average of 19.20, with a high score of 28, while behind the stumps he took 11 catches. He later taught at Haileybury, where for 13 years he held the position of master of the college, and was then headmaster of King William's College on the Isle of Man for seven years. He later became the head of the Association of Governing Bodies of Independent Schools, a role he presently holds.

Westley attended Lancaster Royal Grammar School with his twin brother, Roger, and both played for Oxford University in first-class cricket, one of the few times twins have appeared together in first-class cricket. His brother coached cricket at Haileybury, before dying in 1982.
