= Athol Murray (historian) =

Scottish historian and archivist

Athol Laverick Murray (1930–2018) was a historian and archivist.

He was the son of George Murray, a bank manager, and Margery Laverick.

He was first educated at Lancaster Royal Grammar School and then studied at Cambridge and gained his PhD at the University of Edinburgh in 1961 on the records of the Scottish exchequer. He was briefly a teacher at the Sebright School in Worcestershire. He joined the Scottish Record Office, now National Records of Scotland, as an Assistant Keeper, in 1953. He became Keeper of Records in 1985. During his time at the Record Office, he worked closely with Alma Calderwood.

He provided an essay on the administration of the Scottish treasury and its documentary record in 1970. The historian Julian Goodare noted that Athol Murray had carefully explained the story of John Acheson, a Scottish goldsmith and mining entrepreneur.

== Publications ==
- The Royal Grammar School Lancaster: A History (W. Heffer, 1951).
- Sebright school, Wolverley: A History (W. Heffer, 1953).
- 'The Procedure of the Scottish Exchequer in the Early Sixteenth Century', Scottish Historical Review, 40:130 part 2 (October 1961), pp. 89-117.
- 'The pre-Union Records of the Scottish Exchequer', Journal of the Society of Archivists, 2:3 (April 1961), pp. 88–101
- 'Pursemaster's Accounts', Miscellany of the Scottish History Society, X (Edinburgh, 1965).
- "The Revenues of the Bishopric of Moray in 1538", Innes Review, 4 (Spring 1968), pp. 40–56. doi:10.3366/inr.1968.19.1.40
- 'Sir John Skene and the exchequer, 1594-1612', Stair Society Miscellany, vol. 1 (Edinburgh, 1971).
- 'Huntly's Rebellion and the administration of justice in north-east Scotland, 1570–1573', Northern Scotland, 4 (1981).
- 'Financing the Royal Household: James V and his Comptrollers', Renaissance and Reformation in Scotland (Scottish Academic Press, Edinburgh, 1983), pp. 42–59.
- 'Exchequer, Council and Session, 1513-1542', Janet Hadley Williams, Stewart Style (East Linton: Tuckwell, 1996), pp. 97-117
- 'The monuments of a family: A collection of jewels associated with Elizabeth of Bohemia', PSAS, 131 (2002), pp. 327-348
- 'A Memorandum on the Customs, 1597', Miscellany of the Scottish History Society (Edinburgh, 2004), pp. 66-83
