= Lancaster Royal Grammar School =

Secondary school in Lancaster, Lancashire, England

Coordinates: 54°02′49″N 2°47′21″W

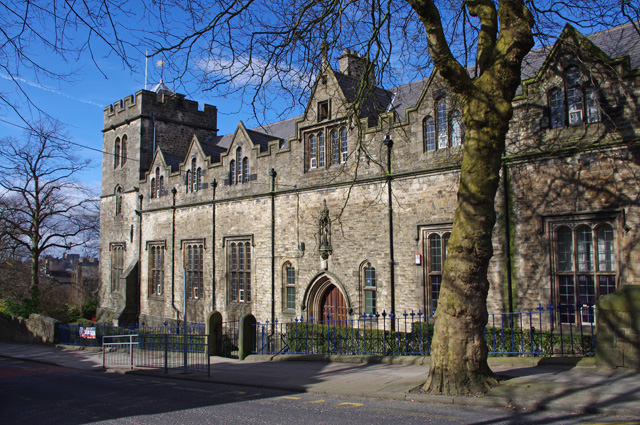
- School badge Lancaster Royal Grammar School building

Location
- East Road; Lancaster, Lancashire, LA1 3EF; England

Information
- Type: State school Grammar school for boys 11-18; Day and boarding school
- Motto: Praesis ut prosis ("Lead in order to serve")
- Religious affiliation: Christian (Non-denominational)
- Established: c. 1235; 791 years ago
- Founder: John Gardyner (endowment c.1472)
- Department for Education URN: 136742 Tables
- Ofsted: Reports
- Headmaster: C.J Pyle
- Staff: ≈120 (academic) 78 support staff
- Gender: Boys, with co–educational sixth form
- Age: 11 to 18
- Enrolment: 1,386
- Houses: Boarding: School, Ashton, Storey, Frankland (Annexe of School)
- Colour
- Publication: The Lancastrian (until 2018)
- Alumni: Old Lancastrians
- Boat Club: Lancaster Royal Grammar School Boat Club (LRGSBC)
- Website: www.lrgs.org.uk

Lancaster Royal Grammar School (LRGS) is an 11–18 boys grammar school in Lancaster, Lancashire, England. Founded in the 14th century, it is one of the oldest schools in England. Old students belong to The Old Lancastrians. The school's sixth form opened to girls in 2019. LRGS is also in the United Kingdom's thirty oldest schools.

== History ==
=== Establishment ===
The school was founded between 1235 and 1256, probably nearer to the former, and was later endowed as a free school by John Gardyner. The first definite mention of the old grammar school is found in a deed dated 4 August 1469, when the Abbess of Syon granted to John Gardyner, of Bailrigg (near Lancaster), a lease of a water-mill on the River Lune and some land nearby for two hundred years to maintain a chaplain to celebrate worship in the Church of St. Mary, Lancaster, and to instruct boys in grammar freely, "unless perchance something shall be voluntarily offered by their friends".

In 1472, John Gardyner's will made further provisions for the endowment of the school, and also for William Baxstonden to keep the school so long as he could teach the students.

=== Rebuild ===
In 1682, the school was rebuilt and in 1852 was removed from the old site on the slopes by the priory to the outskirts of the city, where it now stands (though the city has expanded beyond it). Now known as Old School House, this building that stands on the north side of East Road, was designed by the local architects Sharpe and Paley at a cost of £8,000 (equivalent to £970,000 in 2025). The foundation stone was laid on 5 May 1851 by James Prince Lee, the Bishop of Manchester. The title "Royal" was granted by Queen Victoria in the same year. This building is recorded in the National Heritage List for England as a designated Grade II listed building.

=== Recent history ===
In 1969, the school celebrated its quincentenary and was visited by Elizabeth II. In 1995, the school received a visit from the Chancellor of the Duchy of Lancaster, Roger Freeman. In 2001, to mark the 150th anniversary of becoming the Royal Grammar School, the school welcomed Anne, Princess Royal. In 2011, the school was granted academy status. On 6 November 2017, the school stated that they will be accepting sixth form girls from September 2019.

== Overview ==
=== Academic attainment ===
In 2022, students achieved A and A* grades in 62.9% of the A level exams that they sat. Over 75% of all results were graded A*, A or B.

The 2007 Ofsted report stated that "this is an outstanding school that provides very good value for money. The overwhelming majority of parents value greatly the school and its impact on their children."

In 2021, the school was inspected by Ofsted for the first time in fifteen years. They found the school had "outstanding" behaviour and attitudes, personal development, sixth Form, and boarding provisions; and "good" quality of education, and leadership and management; with an overall rating of "good". The downgrade from "outstanding" was part of a wider wave of downgrades in the inspection status of some of the UK's top grammar schools after the inspection exemption for "outstanding" schools was removed, and was criticised by headteachers.

In 2022 at GCSE 63.2% of all grades were 9-7, with nearly all pupils gaining 10 passes. In 2022 the grades 9–5 in English and mathematics was 98%.

In 2025, The Times ranked the school as the ninth best in the North West.

=== Boarding provision ===
Old School House.

LRGS is a state boarding school with four boarding houses (Storey, Frankland, Ashton and School Houses) and 170 boarders. There are two senior boarding houses (Y10-U6), School and Ashton (School being the largest and oldest of the houses overall). School House consists of approx 60 boys living in New School House (formerly Gardyner House) and approx 20 girls in Frankland House (which serves as a sub-boarding house/annexe to School house). School House is led by a Senior Housemaster, Assistant Housemaster (School House), Assistant Housemistress (Frankland House), 2 matrons for each physical house, as well as a number of resident and duty tutors.

Frankland House is a sub-boarding house/annexe administered as part of School House. The house consists of approx 20 girls in a single building on the lower site of the school, with an Assistant Housemistress resident, and 2 matrons during the day, sharing tutors with School House. Ashton House acts as the other senior boarding house with approx 50 boys living in 2 houses, Ashton House and Ashton Annexe (both located on the upper site of the school). The house is run by a Senior Housemaster, Assistant Housemaster, 3 matrons and resident/duty tutors. Storey House is the principal junior boarding house (Y7-Y9) with approx 40 boys. The house has a Senior Housemaster, Assistant Housemaster, 3 matrons and 7 resident/duty tutors. Boys decide at the end of Year 9 which senior house they wish to move to, transfers to the other senior house are unusual after the start of Year 10, although can occur in exceptional circumstances.

Boarding is run by an Assistant Headmaster (Assistant Head for Boarding and Co-curricular). On each weekday, in each boarding house, there is a tutor and matron on duty as well as other resident staff, including resident tutors and Sports Graduates/Coaches, who each participate in house duties. Each senior house (and annexe) operates a prefect system, consisting of: Head of House, Deputy Head(s) of House, Heads of Years, and other specific house life prefect roles. These systems are independent of the day school prefecture, and boarding prefects are directly responsible to their Housemaster, however many boarding prefects also have day school prefect roles. Although prefects do have sanctioning/soft disciplinary powers, it is at the discretion of the individual housemaster to form and maintain a conduct system and decide the roles prefects play.

The majority of boarders come from the northwest of England; others come from across the UK and overseas. Ofsted inspectors found boarding to be Outstanding in all categories in 2023.

=== Sport ===
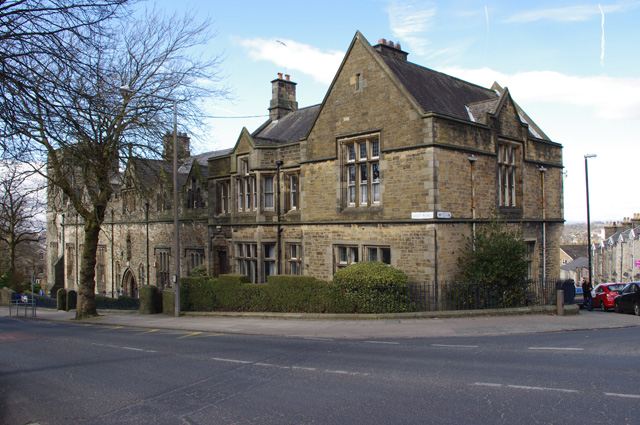
The old school building on East Road. Building on this site started in 1851. The school has subsequently extended across the road and further up the hill

The school offers a wide range of sporting activities to the students throughout their school careers including tennis, sailing, swimming, rowing, cross country running etc. but remains a bastion of rugby union. Achievement in this code is generally accorded more prominence in school life than other activities but the school has achieved more notable success in rowing and cross country running, especially when their far lower budgets are taken into account. Nonetheless, the school has produced some notable figures in rugby union such as the former England and Bath coach Brian Ashton, former captain of Norway Erik Lund and his brother the England international Magnus Lund.

Former pupils have achieved Olympic success. Jason Queally, took track cycling gold in the 1 km time trial at the 2000 Summer Olympics and Scott Durant won gold with the British Men's Eight in the 2016 Summer Olympics (see Boat Club).

In 2011, the LRGS lst XI won the Local Football Cup, beating Morecambe High School 1–0 at the Globe Arena. In 2014, the LRGS 1st XI cricket team became the first in the school's history to win the RGS Festival. The trophy was contested in Newcastle over a week of fixtures, and LRGS finished without losing a game in the tournament. In 2015 the U13s won the Lancashire Cup Final against Audenshaw 20–5. In 2012, the LRGS 1st XV reached the last 8 of the Rosslyn Park National 7s tournament and the U16s reached the last 32. In 2010, the 1st XV, won the Lancashire Cup Final, and became champions in a match against Merchant Taylor's Crosby. This achievement was followed by the U14s and the U15s who were victorious in finals against Merchant Taylor's Crosby and Manchester Grammar School, respectively. In 2009, the U13s and U14s reached the finals of the Lancashire Cup, however both lost narrowly against Manchester Grammar School. In the 2008/2009 season, LRGS won the Lancashire schools cup in the U18s and the U13s as well as winning the Floodlit cup for Lancashire and Cheshire in the U16s. They also set a new record with four teams reaching the county finals. While, in 2007/2008 season, LRGS won the Lancashire Cup in the U15 and U16 age groups.

In recent years the school has enjoyed an improved reputation in cricket with recent highlights including the school's 1st XI Cricket team's narrow defeat in the Sir Garfield Sobers Tournament at The Kensington Oval Barbados in July 2011. The school achieved a victory over Charterhouse School in the final of the Lord's Taverners Cricketer Colts Trophy for Schools in 1999, and enjoyed a run to the semi-final of the Daily Mail U18 Cup in 2004. In 2010, LRGS became the U19 and U16 district champions for table tennis.

=== The Boat Club ===
Lancaster Royal Grammar School Boat Club was founded in 1948. They were tenants of Lancaster John O'Gaunt Rowing Club from 1985 to 2011. In 2011 the Boat Club relocated to Halton Army Training Camp.

The boat club had 15 years of national success under Tim Lucas achieving medal success in either the Schools' Head of the River Race, The National Schools Regatta or the National Rowing Championships for ten consecutive years from 1992 to 2002. The club also made at least the final of a national event from 1992 to 2006. The club has had much international success with members of the boat club rowing at a national level, including the Munich International Regatta in 2006 and the Coupe de la Jeunesse in 2006. His successor Peter Jago coached OL Scott Durant who was member of the Great Britain Eight that won gold in the 2016 Olympic Summer Games. Scott started rowing at Lancaster Royal Grammar School aged 15 with his twin brother Mason.

In 2015, Storm Desmond devastated the boathouse, destroying many boats from the fleet. However, the club has since obtained a new fleet of Kanghua boats and a larger boathouse.

=== Combined Cadet Force ===
The Combined Cadet Force (CCF) at LRGS comprises Royal Navy, Army and Royal Air Force sections. Pupils in year nine and above are allowed to join. It parades on Tuesday afternoons after school and is voluntary. All sections participate in camps throughout the year, including an annual summer camp during the summer holidays, and an Easter camp involving adventurous training in which all three sections can participate. The Contingent, as of 2019 maintains around 200 members, and is led by a Cadet RSM, which can be drawn from any section (though typically of the Army).

The school has had its own CCF since 1914, then known as the Officer Training Corps. Its roots, however, can be traced back further still, as there are "references to the existence at Lancaster of a Cadet Volunteer Battalion in the early nineteenth century". and in 1861, the seventy-strong Battalion was presented with a silver bugle "by Mrs Lee, wife of the Headmaster".

The Royal Navy Section consists of around 35 cadets, including girls from Lancaster Girls' Grammar School, who have been participating since September 2012. The main activities offered are water-based, and the section sails on Marine Lake, Southport. Cadets in the Navy section also attend national camps and courses run by HQ CCF RN, on which cadets can gain nationally recognised qualifications in topics from power boating to first aid.

The Army Section is approximately 195 students strong. Since September 2019, girls have been able to join the army section. They participate in camps throughout the year including an annual camp that lasts over a week, and an Easter Camp where they take part in adventurous training activities, a range day where the cadets fire the L98-A2 Cadet GP Rifle, a field day where the cadets deploy on Manoeuvers for 24hours equipped with blank rounds and a night navigation exercise named Operation Night Owl. Annual Camp 2007 was at a CCF Central Camp at Wathgill, in North Yorkshire. Senior Cadets of the army section are eligible to participate in the Senior Cadet Instructor Course (SCIC) and the Master Cadet Course.

The Royal Air Force section is the second most popular section with about 85 cadets, who receive flying lessons in the Grob Tutor T.1 aircraft and gliding lessons in the Grob Vigilant G 109 glider. Due to COVID-19, the RAF section has had limited opportunities to fly and have not done so as a section since the pandemic. The RAF section was the first section of the Contingent to have been led by a female cadet, Cadet Warrant Officer.

The Contingent holds an annual prize-giving parade, at which awards are given by the Contingent Commander, Section Commanders and distinguished guests to Cadets who have performed at the highest standards.

All three sections of the CCF learn how to use the L98-A2 Cadet GP Rifle. Various shooting activities take place for all three sections and new recruits in the Army section are tested on the GP Rifle during Easter at Sealand Ranges.

== Headmasters ==
Dates are of taking office.

Year	Headmaster	Year	Headmaster
13th century
(1235)	Thomas de Kirkham	Before 1291	Thomas de Kirkham
Before 1284	William de Lancaster		
14th century
c.1311	William de Lancaster	Before 1338	John Banastre
15th century
1472	William Baxstonden		
16th century
Before 1501	Sir Ralph Elcock	Before 1553	Robert Mackerell
Before 1547	John Lunde		
17th century
Before 1613	Mr Walden	1663	Edward Holden
Before 1613	Roger Brook	1677	John Barrow
1621	John Foster	1681	Thomas Lodge
1631	James Schoolcroft	1690	William Bordley
1653	Michael Altham		
18th century
1708	Thomas Holme.	1765	James Watson
1725	Stephen Lewis	1794	John Widditt
1733	William Johnson		
19th Century
1802	Joseph Rowley	1872	William Emmanuel Pryke
1812	John Beethom	1893	George Alfred Stocks
1850	Thomas Faulkner Lee		
20th Century
1903	Herbert Armstrong Watson	1961	John Lorraine Spencer
1912	John Henry Shackleton Bailey	1972	Anthony Michael Joyce
1939	Robert Raymond Timberlake	1983	Peter John Mawby
21st Century
2001	Andrew Jarman	2012	Christopher Pyle

== Notable alumni ==
Former pupils are known as "Old Lancastrians" and there are several branches of the club in the UK and worldwide. Notable Old Lancastrians include:

=== Academia, Medicine & Science ===
- Maurice Cassidy, Physician to King George V
- Sir Edward Frankland (1825–1899), chemist
- Douglas Johnson (historian)
- John Edward Marr, British geologist, Fellow of St John's College, Cambridge and lecturer of geology at the University of Cambridge
- Sir Richard Owen, naturalist
- Hugh Pennington, biologist, head of the 1996 Pennington Enquiry, professor of bacteriology at the University of Aberdeen from 1979 to 2003
- Sir Peter Ratcliffe, Nobel Prize winner for medicine 2019, Nuffield Professor of Clinical Medicine at the University of Oxford since 2004
- David Roy Shackleton Bailey, Latin scholar
- Kenneth Robert Sporne, botanist

=== Vice-Chancellors & Heads of House ===
- Roger Ainsworth, Master of St Catherine's College, Oxford and professor of engineering science from 1998;
- Matthew Hutton, 16th century Archbishop of York, and Master of Pembroke College, Cambridge;
- David Maguire, Vice-Chancellor of the University of Greenwich and the University of East Anglia;
- Sir Albert Seward, Master of Downing College, Cambridge Vice-Chancellor 1924-26;
- Paul Wellings, Vice-Chancellor of Lancaster University and the University of Wollongong;
- William Whewell, scientist, Master of Trinity College, Cambridge Vice-Chancellor in 1842 and 1855 and reputed inventor of the word scientist;

=== Armed Forces ===
- Alexander Birtwistle, Army officer;
- Frederick Crossfield Happold, headmaster and army officer awarded DSO in 1916;
- Air Vice-Marshal George "Larry" Lamb, station commander of RAF Lyneham from 1969 to 1971;
- Commander Brian C. Longbottom, RN. Youngest RN Captain in WWII, and senior NATO official;

=== Arts & Media ===
- Joe Abercrombie, fantasy novelist;
- Jon Richardson, stand-up comedian and comedy writer, 2009 Edinburgh Comedy Award nominee, panel shows including 8 Out of 10 Cats;
- Bob Shennan, BBC radio executive and controller of BBC Radio 2;
- Tom Sutcliffe (broadcaster), BBC presenter and arts editor;
- Robert Samuel Woof, first director of the Wordsworth Trust;

=== Business & Finance ===
- James Crosby, former chief executive of the HBOS Group and former deputy chairman of the FSA;
- Samuel Gregson, merchant;
- Sir Ronald Halstead (1927–2021) – Chairman and Chief Executive of the Beecham Group from 1984 to 1985 and Deputy Chairman of British Steel from 1986 to 1994;
- Nigel Morris, co-founder and former COO of Capital One;
- Colin Povey, chief executive of Warwickshire County Cricket Club and former chief executive of Carlsberg;
- Kevin Roberts, former CEO worldwide Saatchi & Saatchi;
- Herbert Storey, businessman and High Sheriff of Lancashire;
- James Williamson, Baron Ashton;

=== Politics, Civil Service & Law ===
- Robert Altham, judge;
- Robert Ascroft, Conservative MP for Oldham from 1895 to 1899;
- Samuel Cooke (judge), High Court Judge;
- Donald Falshaw, High Court Judge, India;
- Don Foster, Baron Foster of Bath, Liberal Democrat MP for Bath from 1992 to 2015;
- Norval Helme, Lancaster MP from 1900 to 1918;
- Simon Henig, leader of Durham County Council and chair of the North East Combined Authority;
- Lewis Henry Isaacs, architect, surveyor and Conservative MP for Walworth from 1885 to 1892;
- Joseph Cooksey Jackson, Conservative MP for Heywood and Radcliffe from 1931–35 and Barrister;
- Jason McCartney, Conservative MP for Colne Valley from 2010 to 2017, and again from 2019 to 2024;
- Athol Murray (historian), Keeper of Records, National Records of Scotland;
- Lord Parkinson, former Conservative Party Chairman and Cabinet Minister;
- Sir John Rutherford, 1st Baronet, Conservative MP for Darwen from 1895 to 1922;
- Sir John Singleton, British High Court Judge and Conservative politician;
- William Swainson (1809-1884), second Attorney General of New Zealand;
- John Wrathall, President of Rhodesia;

=== Religion & Church ===
- Charles Edward Curzon, Bishop of Stepney and Bishop of Exeter;
- Paul Swarbrick (born 1958), Roman Catholic bishop of Lancaster;

=== Sport ===
- Mervyn Brooker, cricket blue and headmaster;
- Phil Christophers, England rugby international;
- Sean Cox, rugby;
- Harold Douthwaite; cricketer, England amateur association football and Cambridge football blue;
- Scott Durant, Olympic rower, gold medallist in the 2016 Summer Olympics;
- Trevor Glover, cricket and rugby blue;
- Erik Lund, Norwegian rugby international captain;
- Magnus Lund, England rugby international;
- Gavin Moffat, cricketer;
- Philip Moffat, cricketer;
- Nick Preston (rugby union); England rugby international;
- Jason Queally, gold medal-winning cyclist at the 2000 Summer Olympics;
- Roger Westley, cricketer;
- Stuart Westley, cricket blue and headmaster;
- Donald Wilkinson, cricketer and headmaster;
- Frank Wrathall, racing driver in the BTCC.

=== Other ===
- Lauren Jeska, transgender fell runner convicted of the attempted murder of Ralph Knibbs

== See also ==
- List of the oldest schools in the United Kingdom
- Listed buildings in Lancaster, Lancashire
