= Roger Westley =

English cricketer

Personal information
- Full name: Roger Bancroft Westley
- Born: 21 March 1947; Preston, Lancashire, England
- Died: 12 May 1982 (aged 35); Welwyn Garden City, Hertfordshire, England
- Batting: Right-handed
- Bowling: Right-arm off break
- Relatives: Stuart Westley (twin brother)

Domestic team information
- Years: Team
- 1969: Oxford University

Career statistics
Competition	First-class
Matches	5
Runs scored	32
Batting average	4.57
100s/50s	–/–
Top score	14
Balls bowled	486
Wickets	4
Bowling average	67.50
5 wickets in innings	–
10 wickets in match	–
Best bowling	2/65
Catches/stumpings	1/–
- Source: Cricinfo, 27 July 2011

Roger Bancroft Westley (21 March 1947 – 12 May 1982) was an English cricketer. Westley was a right-handed batsman who bowled right-arm off break. He was born in Preston, Lancashire and was educated at Lancaster Royal Grammar School.

Westley studied first at Leeds University and continued his education at Corpus Christi College, Oxford. He made his first-class debut for Oxford University against Lancashire in 1969. He made 4 further first-class appearances for the university, all coming in 1969, with the last of which coming against Middlesex. In his 5 first-class appearances, he scored 32 runs at an average of 4.57, with a high score of 14. With the ball, he took 4 wickets at an expensive bowling average of 67.50, with best figures of 2/65.

Westley and his twin brother Stuart both played for Oxford University and represent one of the few times twins have appeared together in first-class cricket.

He later became a house master and cricket coach at Haileybury College. He died at Queen Elizabeth II Hospital in Welwyn Garden City on 15 May 1982, aged just 35, having suddenly collapsed the previous evening.
