= Gavin Moffat =

English cricketer

Personal information
- Full name: Gavin Richard Moffat
- Born: 7 September 1972 (age 54); Morecambe, Lancashire, England
- Batting: Right-handed
- Bowling: Right-arm medium
- Relatives: Philip Moffat (brother)

Domestic team information
- Years: Team
- 1996: Cambridge University

Career statistics
Competition	First-class
Matches	8
Runs scored	45
Batting average	9.00
100s/50s	–/–
Top score	27
Balls bowled	1,110
Wickets	8
Bowling average	98.50
5 wickets in innings	–
10 wickets in match	–
Best bowling	2/50
Catches/stumpings	4/–
- Source: Cricinfo, 15 January 2022

Gavin Richard Moffat (born 7 September 1972) is an English former first-class cricketer.

Moffat was born at Morecambe in September 1972. He was educated at Lancaster Royal Grammar School, before matriculating to Durham University. From there he proceeded to Homerton College at the University of Cambridge. While studying at Cambridge, he played first-class cricket for Cambridge University Cricket Club in 1996, making eight appearances. Playing as a medium pace bowler in the Cambridge side, he took 8 wickets, but struggled against county opposition, which is reflected by his bowling average of 98.50. His best bowling figures were 2 for 50. As a lower order batsman, he scored 45 runs with a highest score of 27. His brother, Philip, was also a first-class cricketer.

After graduating from Cambridge, Moffat began a career in education and was a languages teacher at Stowe School. He is currently the assistant headteacher of Akeley Wood School, specifically head of the sixth form AW6.
