= Brian Foley (bishop) =

English prelate

Brian Charles Foley
- Bishop of Lancaster
- Church: Catholic Church
- Diocese: Diocese of Lancaster
- In office: 26 April 1962 – 22 May 1985
- Predecessor: Thomas Flynn
- Successor: Jack Brewer

Orders
- Ordination: 25 July 1937
- Consecration: 13 June 1962 by John Heenan

Personal details
- Born: 25 May 1910 Ilford, London, United Kingdom of Great Britain and Ireland
- Died: 23 December 1999 (aged 89)

Brian Charles Foley (1910–1999) was an English prelate who served as the Roman Catholic Bishop of Lancaster from 1962 to 1985.

Born in Ilford, Essex on 25 May 1910, he was ordained a priest for the Diocese of Brentwood on 25 July 1937. He was appointed the Bishop of the Diocese of Lancaster by the Holy See on 26 April 1962. His consecration to the Episcopate took place on 13 June 1962, the principal consecrator was John Carmel Heenan, Archbishop of Liverpool (later Cardinal Archbishop of Westminster), and the principal co-consecrators were George Andrew Beck, Bishop of Salford (later Archbishop of Liverpool) and Bernard Patrick Wall, Bishop of Brentwood. He attended all the four sessions of the Second Vatican Council, held between in 1962 and 1965.

Bishop Foley retired on 22 May 1985 and assumed the title Bishop emeritus of Lancaster. He died on 23 December 1999, aged 89. He was the uncle of British Labour politician Chris Mullin.

Catholic Church titles
| Preceded by Thomas Flynn | Bishop of Lancaster; 1962–1985 | Succeeded by John Brewer |
