= Harold Douthwaite =

English cricketer

Harold Douthwaite (12 August 1900 – 9 July 1972) was an English cricketer active from 1920 to 1921 who played for Lancashire. He was born and died in Lancaster and attended Lancaster Royal Grammar School which he later taught at. He studied geography at Peterhouse, Cambridge University. He appeared in three first-class matches as a righthanded batsman, scoring 85 runs with a highest score of 29, and held one catch.
