= Kenneth Robert Sporne =

British botanist

Kenneth Robert Sporne (23 December 1915 – 12 April 1989) was a British botanist and plant morphologist who lectured at Cambridge University.

== Early life and education ==
Sporne was born in Towcester, moving to Morecambe where his father, Robert William Sporne, was a headmaster. He attended The Royal Grammar School, Lancaster where, unable to study biology, he pursued an interest in collecting plants and animals, going on to win the Sanderson Herbarium Prize. He studied biology at Downing College, Cambridge, where his interest was in ecology, especially the salt marshes of the river Lune. He completed his Natural Sciences Tripos in 1939 and went on to study floral evolution under Dr H. Hamshaw Thomas. He joined a collecting expedition to Jamaica for three months with Dr Val J. Chapman.

== War service ==
As an undergraduate, Sporne had been a member of the Signals branch of the Cambridge University Officers' Training Corps. During the Second World War he volunteered for service and served in the Royal Corps of Signals, being commissioned and taking part in D-Day on D-Day+3. He was awarded the Belgian Croix de Guerre with palm and a Chevalier of the Order of Leopold II. Eventually he was promoted to major, and his last task was to set up an automatic telephone exchange connecting the main military headquarters in West Germany.

== Career ==
Back at Downing College after the war, Sporne was a temporary demonstrator (1946), appointed to a demonstratorship in 1948 and lecturer in Botany (1955). He became a Fellow (1949–1976) and eventually Emeritus Fellow; he was Director of Studies in Biology (1950–1976) and Dean (1952–1967). He visited New Zealand in 1951 and 1969. He was elected a Fellow of the Linnean Society in 1956.

Sporne's main interest was in angiosperm evolution and he pioneered the statistical analysis of the correlations between plant characteristics as a way of studying plant evolution. In 1980 he published his 'advancement index' for 291 dicotyledonous angiosperm families using 30 correlated characters.

Sporne published three major textbooks on plant morphology. He was awarded Doctor of Science (Sc.D.) by the University of Cambridge in 1976. He retired in 1982 and died in Cambridge in 1989.

== Personal life ==
In 1943 Sporne was married in Cambridge to Helen Martin Fletcher (1915–2007), a botanist with degrees from Universities in New Zealand and Cambridge. They had two daughters.

== Books ==
- The Morphology of Pteridophytes, (1962, 1975 4th edition). Hutchinson University Library
- The Morphology of Gymnosperms, (1965, 1974 2nd edition). Hutchinson University Library
- The Mysterious Origin of Flowering Plants, (1971). Oxford Biology Reader No.3.
- The Morphology of Angiosperms, (1974). Hutchinson University Library

== Publications ==
1948 Correlation and classification in dicotyledons. Proceedings of the Linnean Society of London, Session, 160: 40-47.

1949 A new approach to the problem of the primitive flower. New Phytologist, 48: 259-176.

1954 Statistics and the evolution of dicotyledons. Evolution 8: 55 64.

1954 A note on nuclear endosperms as a primitive character among dicotyledons. Phytomorphology, 4: 275-278.

1956 The phylogenetic classification of the angiosperms. Biological Reviews, 31: 1-29.

1958 Some aspects of floral vascular systems. Proceedings of the Linnean Society of London, Session, 169: 75-84.

1959 On the phylogenetic classification of plants. American Journal of Botany, 46, 385-394.

1960 Correlation of biological characters. Proceedings of the Linnean Society of London, Session, 171: 83-85.

1967 Nuclear endosperm an enigma. Phytomorphology, 17: 248-151.

1969 The ovule as an indicator of evolutionary status in angiosperms. New Phytologist, 68: 555-566.

1970 The advancement index and tropical rain-forest. New Phytologist, 69: 1161-1166.

1972 Some observations on the evolution of pollen types in dicotyledons. New Phytologist, 71: 181-185.

1973 A note on the evolutionary status of tapetal types in dicotyledons. New Phytologist, 72: 1173-1174.

1973 The survival of archaic dicotyledons in tropical rain-forests. New Phytologist, 72: 1175-1184.

1974 Pollen evolution in dicotyledons. In R. N. Lakhanpal (Ed.) The Origin and Phytogeography of Angiosperms: 57-61. Special Publication No. 1. Birbal Sahni Institute of Palaeobotany, Lucknow, India. (Paper read in Lucknow, in 1971.)

1975 A note on ellagitannins as indicators of evolutionary status in dicotyledons. New Phytologist, 75: 613-618.

1976 A note on the evolutionary status of aluminium-accumulators among dicotyledons. With E. M. Chenery. New Phytologist, 76: 551-554.

1976 Girdling vascular bundles in dicotyledon flowers. Gardens Bulletin, Singapore, 29: 165-173.

1976 Character correlations among angiosperms and the importance of fossil evidence in assessing their significance. In C. B. Beck (Ed.) Origin and Early Evolution of Angiosperms: 319-329. New York: Columbia University Press. (Paper read in Boulder, Colorado, in 1973.)

1977 Some problems associated with character correlations. In K. Kubitzki (Ed.) Flowering Plants Evolution and Classification of Higher Categories: 33-51. Plant Systematics and Evolution Supplement 1. Vienna: Springer Verlag. (Paper read in Hamburg, 1976.)

1980 A reinvestigation of character correlations amongst dicotyledons. New Phytologist, 85: 419-449.

1982 The advancement index vindicated. New Phytologist, 91: 137 145.
