= Larry Lamb (pilot) =

RAF pilot, rugby union referee and sports administrator

George Colin "Larry" Lamb (23 July 1923 - 22 September 2022) was a senior officer of the Royal Air Force, who also refereed international rugby.

== Early life and education ==
Lamb was born George Colin Lamb in Hornby, Lancashire. He was educated at the Lancaster Royal Grammar School.

== Air force career ==
Lamb joined the RAF in 1943. On returning from pilot training in Canada, he took on a teaching job at RAF College Cranwell, becoming deputy chief flying instructor in 1947. He was awarded the Air Force Cross the same year for his work developing flying pedagogy.

He was involved in various missions, including the Berlin Airlift, during which he flew 86 loads of coal from RAF Schleswigland to East Berlin. He then became an examiner with the Transport Command Examining Unit.

In April 1958, Lamb was given command of the 87 Squadron of all-weather fighters, following which he served as Director of Administrative Plans at the Ministry of Defence, and then Assistant Commandant at RAF College Cranwell.

Lamb was posted to Borneo in the 1960s and was promoted to Deputy Air Commander in March 1965. He was awarded a CBE for improvements to helicopter navigation systems.

Returning to the UK in 1967, Lamb became part of a task force reviewing the RAF's command structure, which recommended replacing the distinct Fighter Command and Bomber Command with one unified Strike Command. Lamb was promoted Air Commodore at Strike Command in April 1968, and in February 1970 he took command of RAF Lyneham.

Lamb became Director of Control (Operations) at National Air Traffic Services in 1972, and Commander Southern Maritime Air Region in May 1974.

Lamb retired from the RAF in April 1978, shortly after being awarded a Companion of the Bath.

== Rugby ==
While serving in the RAF, Lamb also refereed rugby union. He refereed 14 international rugby matches and was a touch judge at the Rugby Football Union's centenary game in 1971. He was secretary of the RAF Rugby Union and was appointed as one of the Rugby Union's representatives to the International Referees Panel in 1964.

For 13 years, Lamb was a member of the committee of the Rugby Football Union, being elected to represent the RAF in 1972, retiring in 1985. He also chaired the RFU Laws sub-committee and the editorial board of Rugby Post, the union's periodical.

At the time of his death, Lamb was England's oldest surviving rugby referee.

== Other sports ==
In October 1978, Lamb became chief executive of the National Badminton Association, where he oversaw the formation of the National Badminton Centre. He organised a far-reaching publicity campaign, eventually getting badminton accepted as an Olympic sport in 1992.

In 1983, Lamb became a member of the Sports Council, from which he retired in 1989, taking up a job as general secretary of the London Sports Medicine Institute. He also became a member of the sports committee of the Prince's Trust in 1985.

== Personal life ==
Lamb married Nancy Godsmark in 1945, having two sons, Tony and Keith, before divorcing. He married a second time, to Maureen Mepham, in 1981. She died in 2015. By the time of his death, Lamb had seven grandchildren and four great grandchildren.

Lamb was also president of the Old Lancastrians Club, an association for alumni of the Lancaster Royal Grammar School.
