= Roman Catholic Bishop of Lancaster =

Catholic bishopric in England

Bishop of Lancaster
- Bishopric

catholic
- Incumbent: Paul Swarbrick

Location
- Ecclesiastical province: Liverpool

Information
- First holder: Thomas Pearson OSB
- Established: 22 November 1924
- Diocese: Lancaster
- Cathedral: Saint Peter's Cathedral, Lancaster

The Bishop of Lancaster is the Ordinary of the Roman Catholic Diocese of Lancaster in the Province of Liverpool, England.

The diocese covers an area of 2,900 km^{2} (1,100 sq mi) and consists of the County of Cumbria together with the Hundreds of Lonsdale, Amounderness and Fylde in the north west of Lancashire. The see is in the city of Lancaster where the bishop's seat is located at the Cathedral Church of Saint Peter.

The diocese was erected on 22 November 1924. The current bishop is the Right Reverend Paul Swarbrick, the 7th Bishop of Lancaster. He succeeded Michael Campbell, O.S.A. in 2018, who was installed on 1 May 2009 and had previously been coadjutor bishop.

== List of the Bishops of the Roman Catholic Diocese of Lancaster, England ==
Do not confuse the first bishop of this diocese with Thomas Bernard Pearson, auxiliary bishop in this diocese from 1949 to 1983.

Roman Catholic Bishops of Lancaster
From	Until	Incumbent	Notes
1924	1938	Thomas Wulstan Pearson, O.S.B.	Previously the Prior of Ealing (1916–1925). Appointed bishop on 18 December 1924 and consecrated on 24 February 1925. Died in office on 1 December 1938.
1939	1961	Thomas Edward Flynn	Appointed bishop on 12 June 1939 and consecrated on 24 July 1939. Died in office on 3 November 1961.
1962	1985	Brian Charles Foley	Appointed bishop on 26 April 1962 and consecrated on 13 June 1962; retired on 22 May 1985; died on 23 December 1999.
1985	2000	John (Jack) Brewer	Formerly an auxiliary bishop of Shrewsbury (1971–1983). Appointed coadjutor bishop of Lancaster on 17 November 1983 and succeeded diocesan bishop on 22 May 1985. Died in office on 10 June 2000.
2001	2009	Patrick O'Donoghue	Formerly an auxiliary bishop of Westminster in 1993–2001. Appointed Bishop of Lancaster on 5 June 2001 and installed on 4 July 2001. Retired 1 May 2009. Died 24 January 2021.
2009	2018	Michael Gregory Campbell, O.S.A.	Appointed coadjutor bishop of Lancaster on 12 February 2008 and succeeded diocesan bishop on 1 May 2009.
2018	present	Paul Swarbrick	Appointed on 12 February 2018 and consecrated on 9 April 2018

== See also ==
- Roman Catholicism in England and Wales
