= Lancaster Cathedral =

Roman Catholic cathedral in Lancaster, England

Coordinates: 54.0470°N 2.7939°W

- St Peter's Cathedral, Lancaster
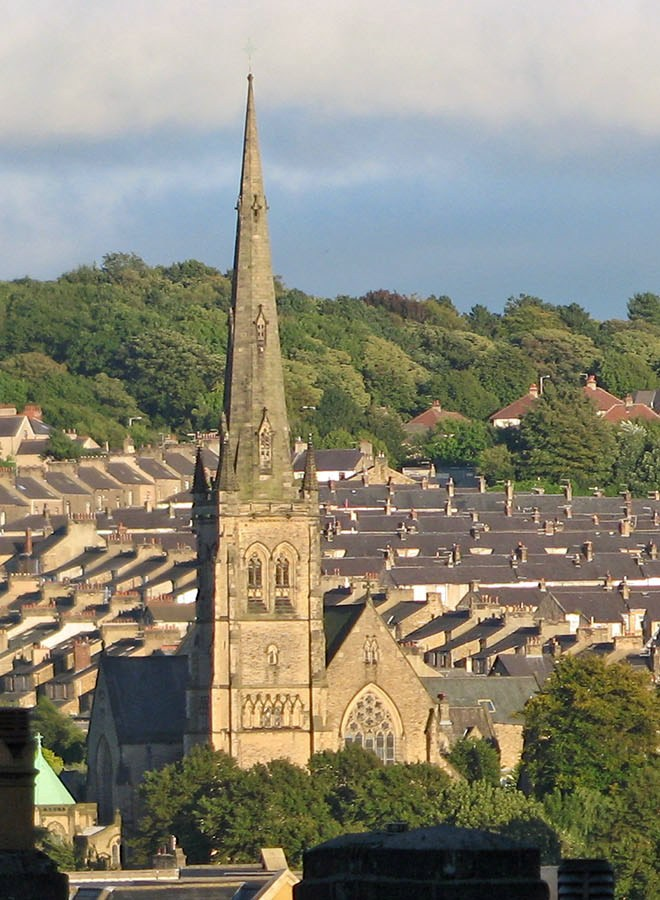
- Lancaster Cathedral showing the apsical east end, the steeple and the baptistry

- Location in Lancaster
- OS grid reference: SD 481,615
- Location: St Peter's Road, Lancaster, Lancashire
- Country: England
- Denomination: Roman Catholic
- Website: www.lancastercathedral.org.uk

History
- Status: Cathedral
- Dedication: Saint Peter and the Lancaster Martyrs

Architecture
- Heritage designation: Grade II*
- Designated: 10 November 1994
- Architect(s): E. G. Paley; Austin and Paley
- Style: Gothic Revival
- Groundbreaking: 1857
- Completed: 1901

Specifications
- Materials: Sandstone, with slate and copper roofs

Administration
- Province: Liverpool
- Diocese: Lancaster

Clergy
- Bishop: Paul Swarbrick

Lancaster Cathedral, also known as The Cathedral Church of St Peter and Saint Peter's Cathedral, is a Roman Catholic cathedral in Lancaster, Lancashire, England. It was a Roman Catholic parish church until 1924, when it was elevated to the status of a cathedral. It started as a mission church in 1798, and the present church was built on a different site in 1857–1859. It was designed by E. G. Paley in the Gothic Revival style and is a grade II* listed building. In 1901 a baptistry was added by Austin and Paley, and the east end was reordered in 1995 by Francis Roberts. The cathedral is in active use, arranging services, concerts and other events, and is open to visitors.

== History ==
Until the passing of the Roman Catholic Relief Act in 1791 Lancaster's Roman Catholics met in a makeshift chapel in St Leonardsgate. Building the first Catholic church in the town began with the laying of the foundation stone for the Lancaster Catholic Mission in Dalton Square on 13 March 1798. The chapel was consecrated during the following year. By the middle of the 19th century, there was a need for a larger church. Land for this was purchased on a different site near to the mission church, and the parish church dedicated to Saint Peter was built. It was designed by the local architect E. G. Paley. Before the church was built, Paley had already designed schools, a convent, and a presbytery which were built on this land. Tenders for the church were invited in March 1857, the foundation stone was laid on 29 April, and the new church was consecrated on 4 October 1859 by Dr Alexander Goss, the bishop of Liverpool. The church and its associated buildings cost a total of £15,000 (£1,180,000 in 2015), of which £2,000 was bequeathed by Thomas Coulston. During future years, additions and alterations were made to the church by Paley and his future partner in the practice, Hubert Austin, and by his own son Henry Paley. These included the addition of a font in 1860, an organ gallery in 1888, chancel stalls in 1899, and a new baptistry in 1901; the baptistry cost £4,000 (£310,000 in 2015).

The golden jubilee of the church was celebrated in 1909, and a number of alterations were made under the direction of Giles Gilbert Scott. These included a new altar, replacement of the tiles on the floor by black and white marble, re-flooring of the nave, painting the walls, and replacing the pine benches by oak pews. In 1924 the Diocese of Lancaster was created and the church was elevated to the status of a cathedral. The cathedra (bishop's throne) was placed in the chancel. When the centenary was celebrated in 1959, the pipe organ was refurbished, and the painted Stations of the Cross were replaced by a set of carvings. Since then, there have been further minor changes to the interior of the cathedral, and in 1995 the east end was reordered by Francis Roberts.

== Architecture ==
=== Exterior ===
The cathedral is constructed in sandstone ashlar, with roofs of slate, other than the baptistry which is roofed in copper. The architectural style is Gothic Revival. Its plan consists of a five-bay nave with a clerestory, aisles and transepts, a two-bay chancel with aisles, side chapels, and a semi-octagonal apse. The steeple stands at the northeast corner, and the octagonal baptistry is attached to the north transept. The steeple consists of a tower with a spire rising to a height of 240 feet (73 m). The tower is in four stages that are separated by string courses, and it has a stair turret at the northwest corner. On the west side of the bottom stage of the tower is a gabled north porch, above which is a canopied niche containing a statue of St Peter, and a three-light window. On each side of the second stage is a row of six arches, the central two arches containing windows, and on each side of the third stage is a small window. The top stage contains paired bell openings, and at the corner of the parapet are pinnacles. The spire is recessed, and has three tiers of lucarnes. At the west end of the church is a doorway, above which is a five-light window containing Geometric tracery. Along the sides of the aisles are three-light windows with Decorated tracery. In the north transept is a four-light window with Geometric tracery, and the south transept contains a ten-light wheel window surrounded by ten circular windows. In the apse are three-light windows containing decorated tracery.

=== Interior ===
Inside the cathedral are six-bay north and south arcades, and a west gallery carried on marble piers. Along the sides are chapels and confessionals. The Lady Chapel is at the northeast of the cathedral. The former sanctuary has been converted into the Blessed Sacrament Chapel, which has paintings on its walls. To the west of the chapel, behind the high altar, is a large reredos designed by Scott; this consists of a triptych containing paintings and carvings. The baptistry contains a central marble font, an altar with a reredos, and stained glass windows by Shrigley and Hunt. There is more stained glass by the same firm elsewhere in the cathedral, and other windows are by Hardman. Also in the church are monuments, one dating from about 1860 by Richard Westmacott, junior. The original organ in St Peter's was moved from the mission church in Dalton Square. This was replaced in 1889 by a new, three-manual organ by Henry Ainscough of Preston. Alterations were made to it in 1976 by Pendlebury of Cleveleys. As of 2012 it is being restored by Henry Willis and Sons of Liverpool. There is a ring of ten bells. Eight of these were cast in 1879 by John Warner and Sons, the other two in 1948 by Mears and Stainbank at the Whitechapel Bell Foundry.

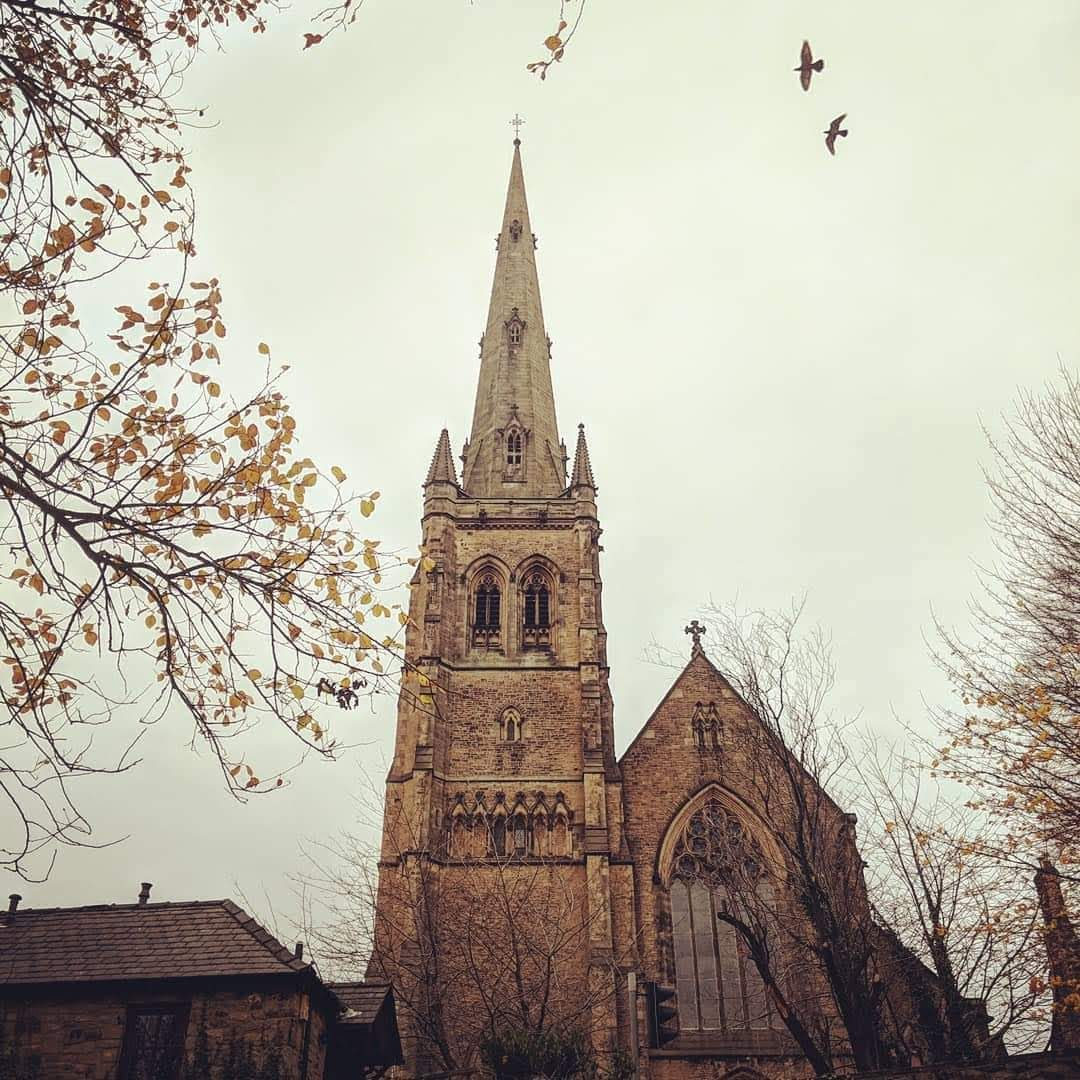
St Peter's Cathedral Lancaster

== Assessment ==
St Peter's was designated as a Grade II* listed building on 10 November 1994. Grade II* buildings are defined as being "particularly important buildings of more than special interest"; only 5.5% of the listed buildings are included in this grade. In the Buildings of England series, Hartwell and Pevsner express the opinion that the church is the "chef d'oeuvre" of Paley's works. They also describe the baptistry as being a "tour de force". In his book about the architectural practice of Sharpe, Paley and Austin, Brandwood expresses the opinion that the building is "Paley's masterwork as an independent church architect".

== Today ==
The building is in active use as a Roman Catholic cathedral, which arranges Masses and other regular services, and organises concerts and other events. The cathedral is open daily to visitors, and arranges group and educational visits.

== Gallery ==
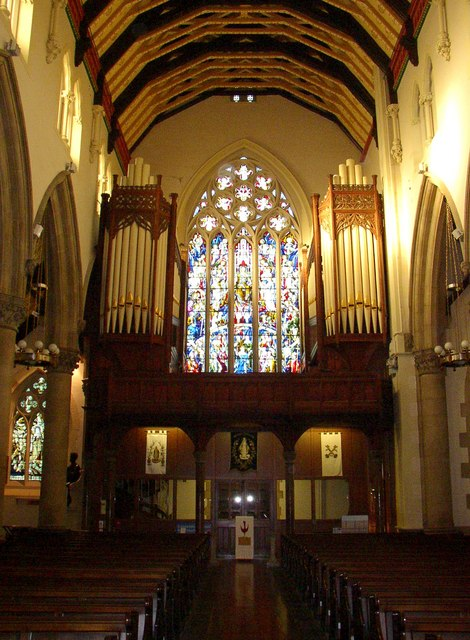
Interior showing the organ and west window

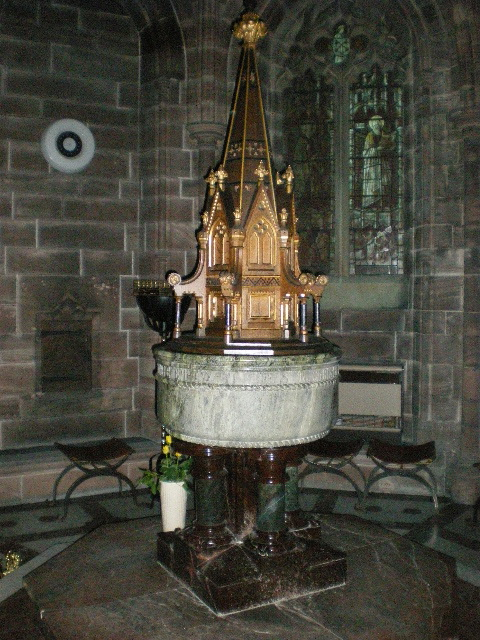
Font in the baptistry

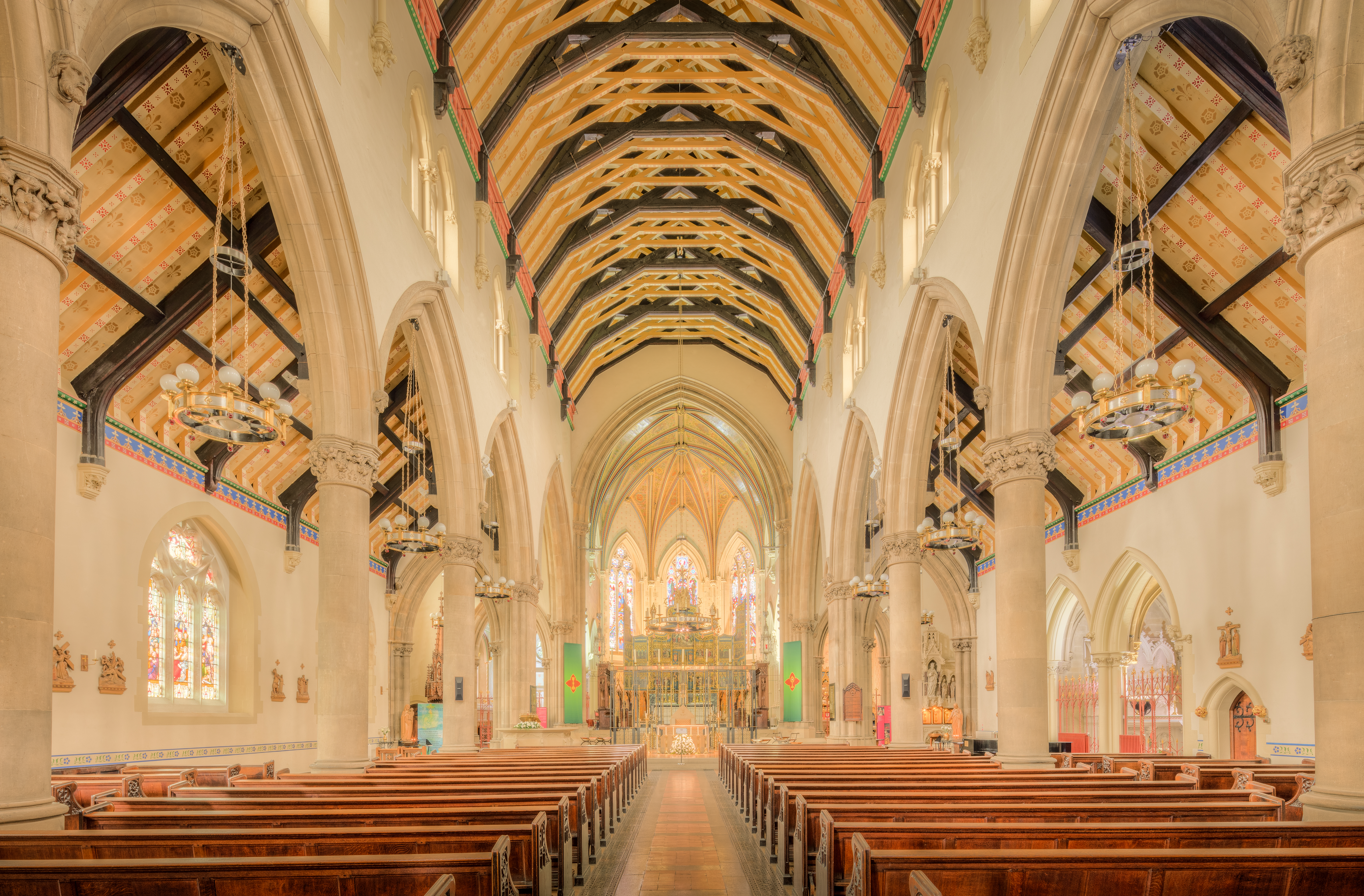
Taken from the nave

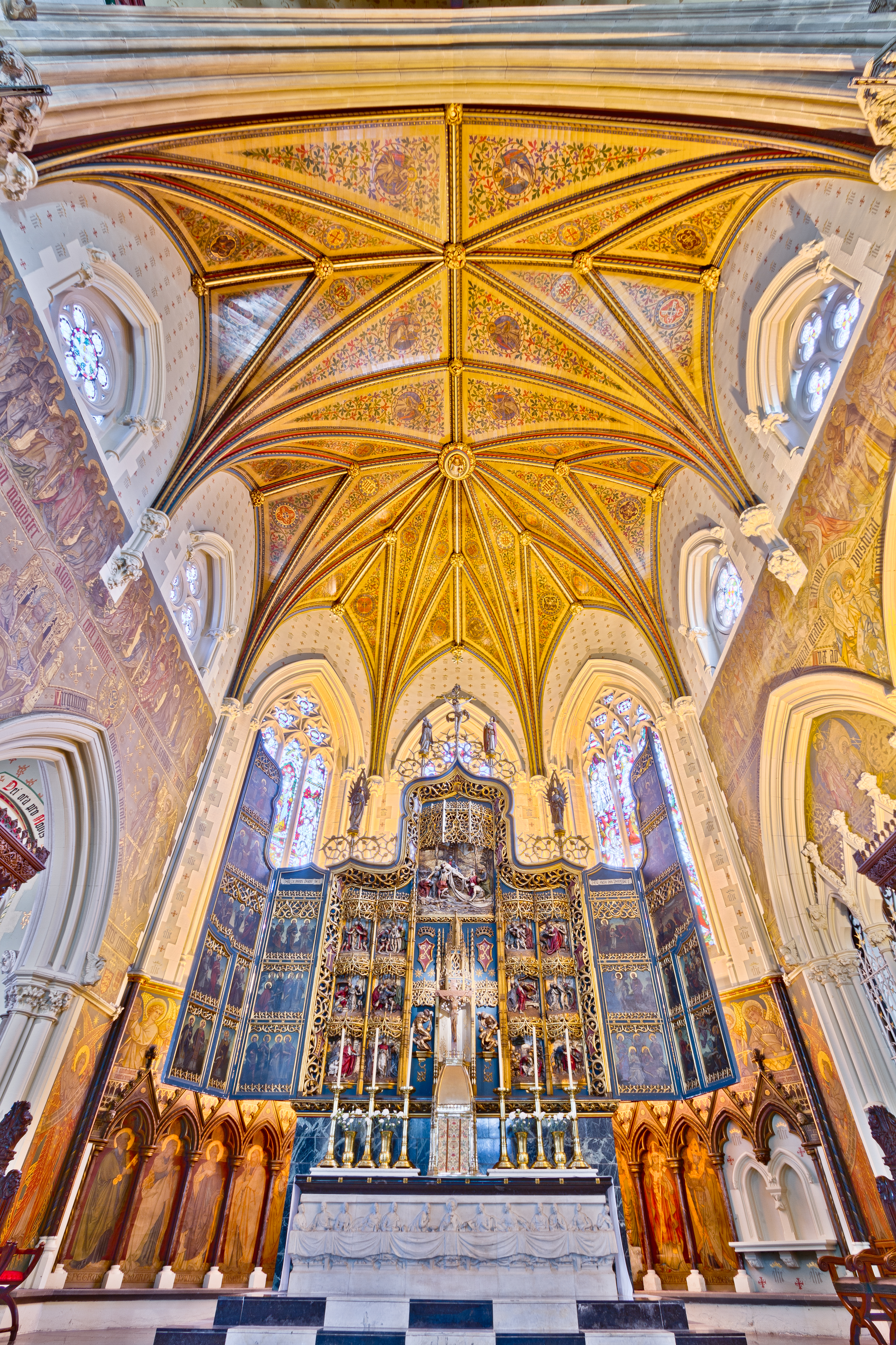
The Blessed Sacrament Chapel

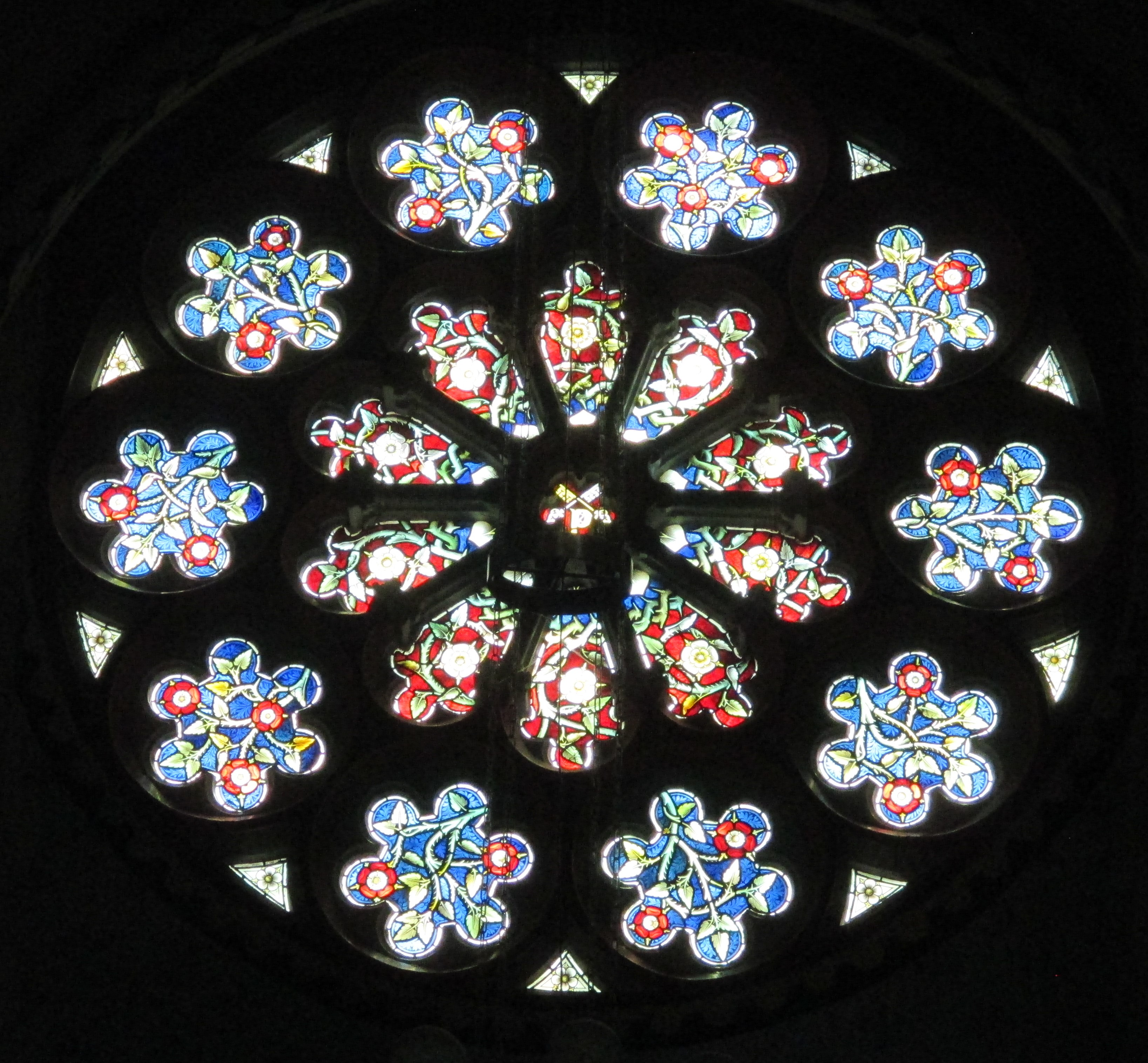
The rose window in the south transept, produced by Hardman & Co.

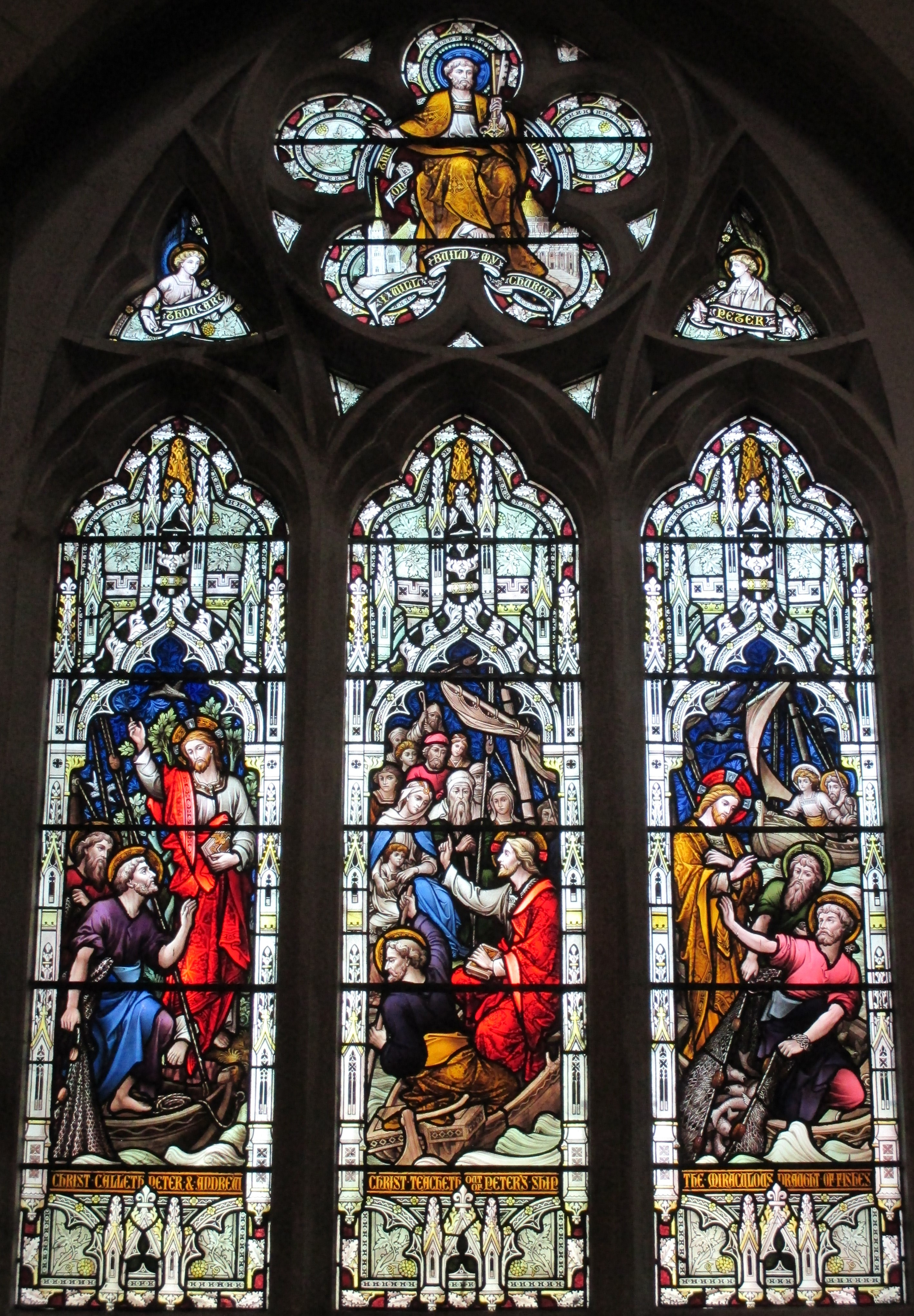
The fourth north aisle window, produced by Hardman & Co.

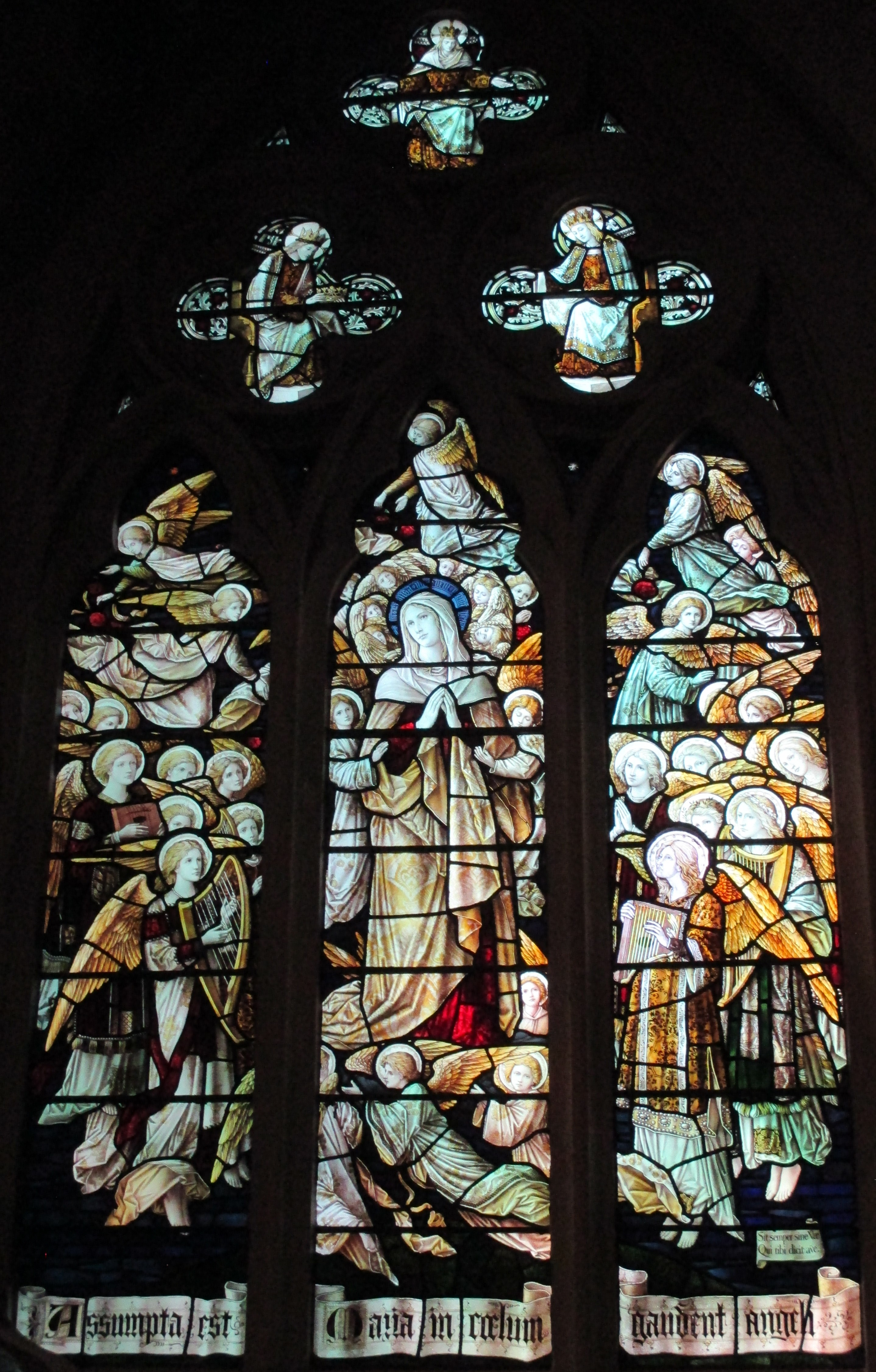
The west window of the south aisle, produced by Shrigley and Hunt from designs by Carl Almquist

== See also ==
- Grade II* listed buildings in Lancashire
- Listed buildings in Lancaster, Lancashire
- List of ecclesiastical works by E. G. Paley
- List of ecclesiastical works by Paley and Austin
