= Michael Campbell (bishop) =

The Right Reverend Michael Campbell OSA
- Bishop of Lancaster
- Church: Roman Catholic Church
- Province: Liverpool
- Diocese: Lancaster
- See: Lancaster
- Appointed: 12 February 2008 (Coadjutor)
- Installed: 1 May 2009
- Term ended: 9 April 2018
- Predecessor: Patrick O’Donoghue
- Successor: Paul Swarbrick
- Previous post: Coadjutor bishop of Lancaster (2008-2009)

Orders
- Ordination: 16 September 1971 by Thomas Bernard Pearson
- Consecration: 31 March 2008 by Patrick O’Donoghue

Personal details
- Born: 2 October 1941 (age 85) Larne, County Antrim, Northern Ireland
- Denomination: Roman Catholic
- Education: University College Dublin; King's College London
- Motto: Ecce nova facio omnia
- Coat of arms

Michael Gregory Campbell OSA (born 2 October 1941) is an Augustinian friar and biblical scholar. He is a prelate of the Roman Catholic Church, who served as the Bishop of Lancaster in England from 2009 to 2018.

== Life ==
Campbell was born in Larne, County Antrim, in Northern Ireland, in 1941 and entered the Order of St. Augustine around 1960. He was educated at University College, Dublin (BA) and King's College London (MA Biblical Studies). He professed solemn religious vows as a full and permanent member of the Order on 17 September 1966. He was ordained as a Catholic priest at the chapel of Austin Friars School in the city of Carlisle on 16 September 1971.

In 2008, Campbell was appointed by Pope Benedict XVI as the coadjutor bishop of the Roman Catholic Diocese of Lancaster. He was consecrated by Patrick O'Donoghue, Bishop of Lancaster. He succeeded O'Donoghue on 1 May 2009.

On his 75th birthday in October 2016, in accordance with the Catholic Church's guidelines, Campbell submitted his resignation to the Vatican which was accepted by Pope Francis. Campbell has stated he will stay in office until a successor is appointed. In 2018, he was succeeded as Bishop of Lancaster by Paul Swarbrick.

== Works ==
- A Shoot from the Stock of Jesse (2006)
- Mary, Woman of Prayer (2007)
- A Time to Seek the Lord (2008)
- The Greatest of These is Love (2008)
- The Way of the Cross with Saint Paul (2009)
- You will be My Witnesses (2011)

Catholic Church titles
Preceded by Patrick O'Donoghue	Bishop of Lancaster; 2009–2018	Succeeded by Paul Swarbrick
