= Diocese of Lancaster =

Catholic diocese in England

Diocese of Lancaster Dioecesis Lancastrensis

Catholic
- Coat of arms

Location
- Country: England
- Territory: County of Cumbria and the northwestern part of the county of Lancashire (the Hundreds of Lonsdale and Amounderness).
- Ecclesiastical province: Liverpool
- Deaneries: 6
- Coordinates: 54.050°N 2.798°W

Statistics
- Area: 2,900 km^{2} (1,100 sq mi)
- Population: Total; Catholics: (as of 2019); 1,232,000; 101,700 (8.3%)
- Parishes: 68
- Churches: 107
- Schools: 81

Information
- Denomination: Roman Catholic
- Sui iuris church: Latin Church
- Rite: Roman Rite
- Established: 22 November 1924
- Cathedral: Lancaster Cathedral
- Patron saint: Our Lady of Lourdes & St Cuthbert
- Secular priests: 95 (including Religious, Overseas & Retired)

Current leadership
- Pope: Leo XIV
- Bishop: Paul Swarbrick
- Metropolitan Archbishop: John Francis Sherrington
- Vicar General: Hugh Pollock; Paul Embery
- Episcopal Vicars: Michael Docherty; Philip Conner; Sam Ofia
- Judicial Vicar: Sony Joseph
- Bishops emeritus: Michael Gregory Campbell OSA

Map
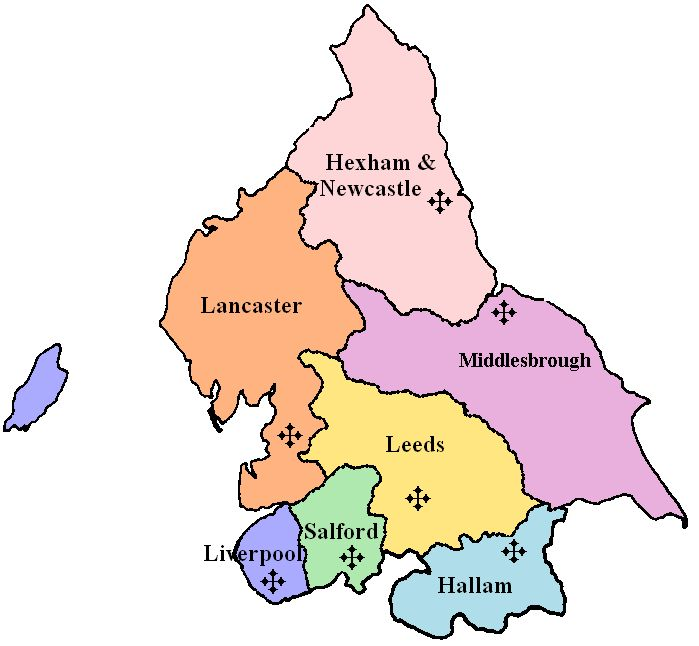
- The Diocese of Lancaster within the Province of Liverpool

Website
- lrcd.org.uk

The Diocese of Lancaster (Latin: Dioecesis Lancastrensis) is a Latin Church Roman Catholic diocese centred on Lancaster Cathedral in the city of Lancaster in Lancashire, England.

== History ==
The diocese was erected in 1924, taking areas and parishes from the Archdiocese of Liverpool and the Diocese of Hexham and Newcastle. Emeritus bishop Patrick O'Donoghue retired on 1 May 2009, and emeritus bishop Michael Gregory Campbell OSA retired on 9 April 2018. As of 9 April 2018, the ordinary is Paul Swarbrick.

== Details ==
It is in the province of Liverpool. It extends along the west of England from the Ribble River in the south of Preston to the Scottish border, comprising the counties of Cumbria and much of Lancashire. The diocese has around 90 active priests, 50 permanent deacons, 12 secondary schools, over a hundred primary schools and a similar number of parishes.

Central organisations of the diocese include the residential youth centre Castlerigg Manor, the Diocesan Youth Service, the Education Centre, Catholic Caring Services and others including the monthly diocesan newspaper, The Voice. There are also many other committees, societies and other informal organisations in the diocese.

== Area and population ==
The diocesan area is 2,900 km^{2} (1,100 sq mi). In 2004 the Catholic population of the diocese was 111,264 for a total of 1,050,000 inhabitants (10.6%).

Areas in the diocese include the city of Preston; a city with an uncharacteristically high Catholic population - the highest anywhere in England & Wales in fact, due in no small part to the fact that the Protestant Reformation never took hold in Preston to the same extent as it did in other places. Also notable in the diocese are: the Lake District, Sellafield nuclear power station, and towns and cities including Carlisle, Lancaster, Blackpool, Whitehaven, Workington, Barrow-in-Furness, the major shipbuilding town.

== Bishops ==
Since the erection of the Diocese in 1924, there have been seven bishops of this diocese. The longest-serving was the third (Brian Charles Foley), who served from 1962 until 1985. The most recent to retire is Michael Gregory Campbell. Campbell was installed on 1 May 2009 following the retirement of Patrick O'Donoghue. On 12 February 2018 it was announced that Pope Francis had appointed Canon Paul Swarbrick, parish priest of Christ the Good Shepherd, Workington, to be the seventh bishop of the diocese. On 9 April 2018, Paul Swarbrick was consecrated and installed as Bishop of Lancaster at St Peter's Cathedral; Vincent Cardinal Nichols attended the ordination.

The above-mentioned main article lists the ordinaries (bishops of the diocese).

=== Coadjutor Bishops ===
- John (Jack) Brewer (1983–1985)
- Michael Gregory Campbell, O.S.A. (2008–2009)

=== Auxiliary Bishop ===
- Thomas Bernard Pearson (1949–1983); do not confuse with Thomas Wulstan Pearson, O.S.B., the first bishop of this diocese.

=== Other priests of this diocese who became bishops ===
- Patrick Altham Kelly, appointed Bishop of Salford in 1984
- Brian Michael Noble, appointed Bishop of Shrewsbury in 1995

== St Peter's Cathedral ==
The Cathedral Church of St Peter on Balmoral Road, Lancaster, is the diocesan cathedral and the seat of the Bishop of Lancaster. Completed in 1859 as a parish Church of the Archdiocese of Liverpool, and raised to the status of a cathedral upon the establishment of the diocese in 1924, it is also a functioning parish. In addition, its grounds host various diocesan offices, including the Bishop's Office, Finance Office, Property Office, and the Diocesan Education Service.

== Gallery ==
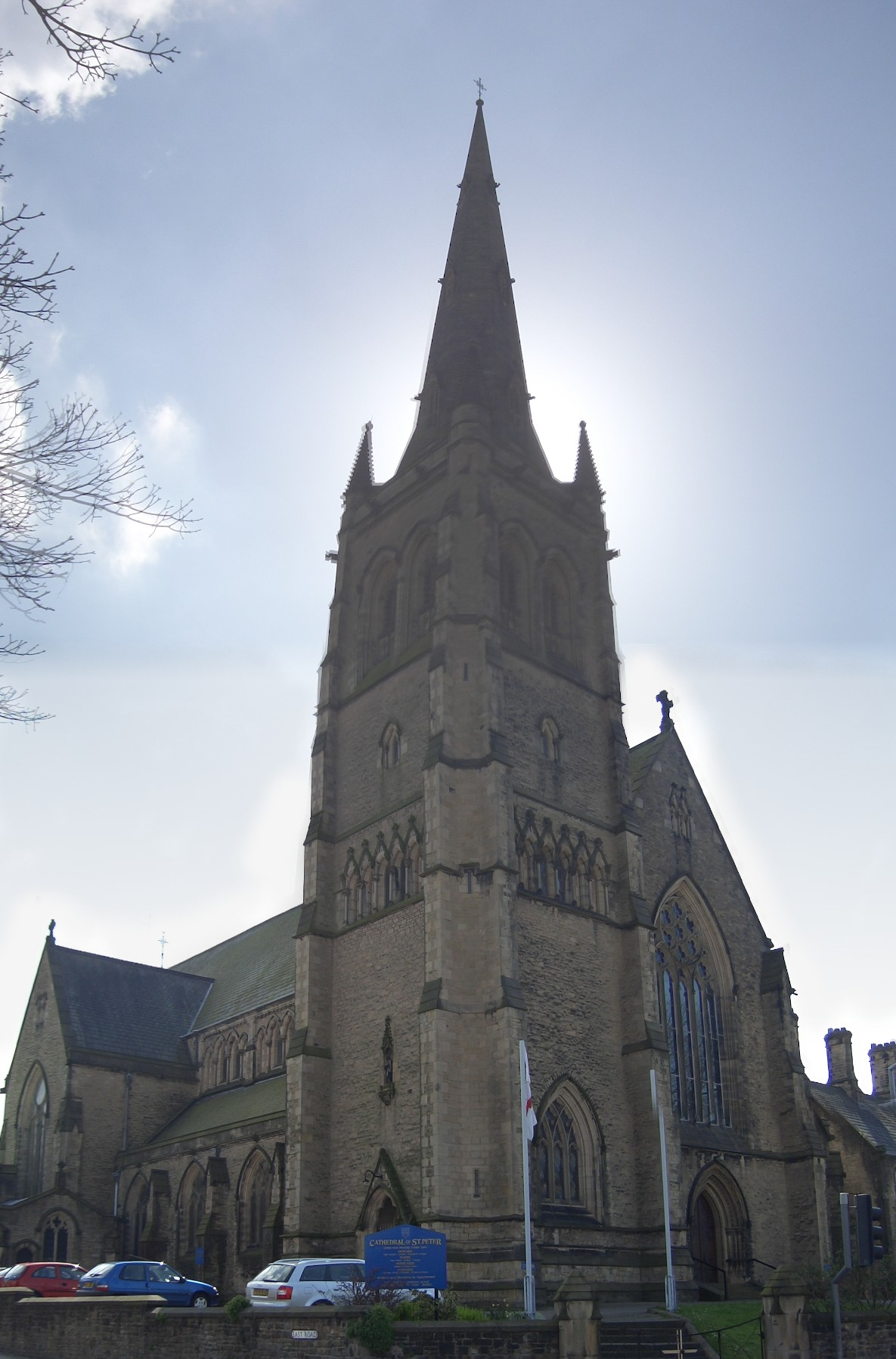
A composite photo of Lancaster Cathedral from the northwest

The Lancaster group for World Youth Day 2005

== See also ==
- List of Catholic churches in the United Kingdom
